= Gatton (surname) =

Gatton is a surname, and may refer to:

- Bill Gatton (1932–2022), American entrepreneur and philanthropist
- Danny Gatton (1945–1994), American guitarist
- Deborah Gatton, American voice actor

== See also ==
- Gatting, surname
- Gatins, surname
