= Gatton =

Gatton may refer to:

Places

- Gatton, Queensland, Australia
  - Shire of Gatton, former administrative region
- Gatton, Surrey, former village in England
  - Gatton (UK Parliament constituency), rotten borough based in the village

People

- Gatton (family), Norman land-owning dynasty in Southern England
- Gatton (surname)

Education

- Gatton College of Business and Economics, University of Kentucky
- Carol Martin Gatton Academy of Mathematics and Science in Kentucky or "Gatton Academy"
