= Sajou no Hana =

Japanese musical group

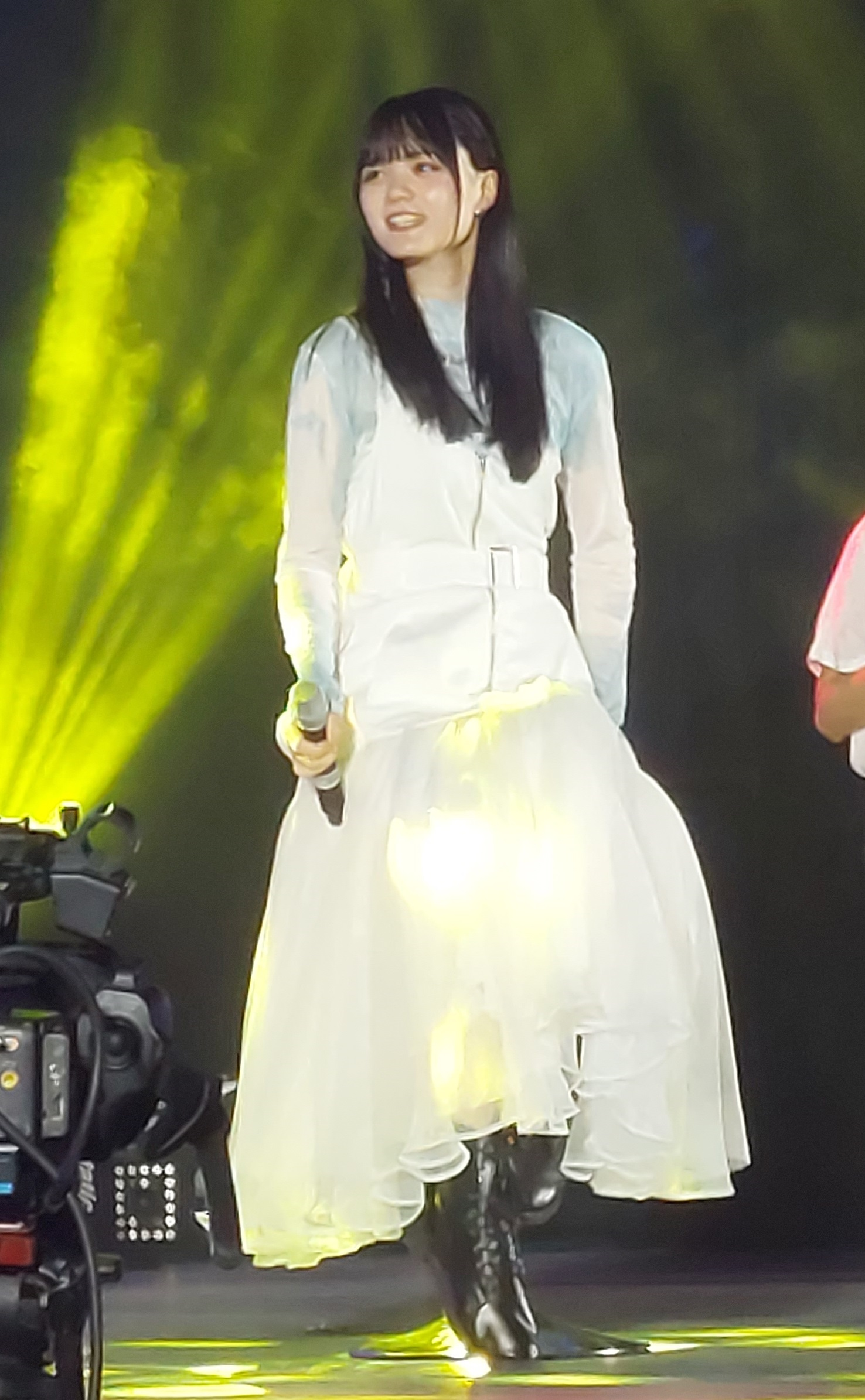
- Vocalist Sana at Cosplay Mania 2024

Background information
- Origin: Japan
- Genres: Rock; Anison
- Years active: 2018–present
- Labels: Warner Bros. Home Entertainment (2018–2021, 2024–present); Kadokawa (2022–present)
- Members: Sana (vocals); Shō Watanabe (keyboard, support member since 2024); Tatsuya Kitani (bassist, support member since 2024)
- Website: sajounohanasana.com

Sajou no Hana (stylized as sajou no hana) is a Japanese rock group signed to Kadokawa and Warner Bros. Japan. It is composed of vocalist Sana, with founder and keyboardist Shō Watanabe and bassist Tatsuya Kitani serving as support members. The group was formed as a rock band in 2018, with their first single "Hoshie" being released the same year; the title track was used as the ending theme to the anime series Sirius the Jaeger. Their music has also been featured in anime series such as Mob Psycho 100, A Certain Scientific Accelerator, Is It Wrong to Try to Pick Up Girls in a Dungeon?, A Certain Scientific Railgun, Spy Classroom, Ishura and The Barbarian's Bride.

== History ==
Vocalist Sana started her music career as a backing vocalist after winning an audition held by the talent agency Smile in 2014. In 2016, she performed the opening theme to the anime series Mob Psycho 100 as the vocalist of the unit Mob Choir.

The group was formed as a rock band in 2018 by composer Shō Watanabe, with Tatsuya Kitani serving as bassist and Sana on vocals. The name Sajou no Hana was coined by Kitani, who was inspired by Sana's image and singing style, with the name using Latin characters instead of using Japanese text with meanings as a way to prevent others from developing bias when listening to their music. Sana liked the name as she thought it sounded beautiful, giving the image of a flower blooming in a barren area (as in 砂上の花 sajō no hana, "flower on the sand"). By not providing an official meaning to the group's name, they wanted listeners to have their own interpretations rather than thinking of a common image.

The band's debut single was "Hoshie" which was released on August 22, 2018; the title song used as the ending theme to the anime series Sirius the Jaeger. The following year, the group performed the theme songs to the anime series Mob Psycho 100 II, including the show's opening theme "99.9" (under the name Mob Choir feat. Sajou no Hana) as well as the ending themes "Grey", "Memosepia" (メモセピア), "Mabuta no Ura" (目蓋の裏), and "Ikiru Hitobito" (いきるひとびと).

In 2019 their single "Parole" was released, with the title song being used as the ending theme to the anime series A Certain Scientific Accelerator.

The group released two singles in 2020: "Aoarashi no Ato de" (青嵐のあとで) and "Evergreen". "Aoarashi no Ato de" was used as the ending theme to the anime series A Certain Scientific Railgun T, with its B-side track "Koko ni Itai" (ここにいたい) being used as an insert song to the show's fifteenth episode. "Evergreen" was used as the ending theme to the third season of Is It Wrong to Try to Pick Up Girls in a Dungeon?.

The group released the single "Tentō" (天灯) in 2022, with the title track being used as the opening theme to the first cour of the fourth season of Is It Wrong to Try to Pick Up Girls in a Dungeon?. They released two singles in 2023: "Kirikizu" (切り傷), whose title track was used as the ending theme to the second cour of the fourth season of Is It Wrong to Try to Pick Up Girls in a Dungeon?, and "Nuisance" (ニューサンス), whose title track was used as the ending theme to the second season of the anime series Spy Classroom. Later that year, it was announced that Watanabe and Kitani were leaving the band in 2024 and the group would be reorganized as a music unit focused on Sana, although they would continue to be involved in the project in a supporting capacity. In 2024, the unit released the song "Shura ni Otoshite" (修羅に堕として; lit. 'Falling into the Carnage'), which was used as the opening theme to the anime series Ishura.

== Discography ==
=== Singles ===
- "Hoshie" (星絵) – Release date: August 22, 2018
- "Memosepia/Grey" (メモセピア / グレイ) – Release date: March 6, 2019
- Parole – Release date: July 31, 2019
- "Aoarashi no Ato de" (青嵐のあとで) – Release date: August 19, 2020
- Evergreen – Release date: December 23, 2020
- "Tentō" (天灯) – Release date: August 24, 2022
- "Kirikizu" (切り傷) – Release date: February 23, 2023
- "Nuisance" (ニューサンス, Nyusansu) – Release date: August 2, 2023
