= Tamara Ryan =

American voice actress

- Born: September 19; Marysville, Kansas, U.S.
- Occupation: Voice actress
- Years active: 2001–present
- Spouse: Charlie Noard (husband)
- Children: Elora Noard (daughter); Tobin Noard (son)

Tamara Ryan (born September 19) is an American voice actress who provides voices for English versions of Japanese anime series and video games. She is known for her anime roles as Falan from Magi: Adventure of Sinbad, Rose from Gundam Build Divers, Chianti from Case Closed Episode One: The Great Detective Turned Small and Dorothea from Sirius the Jaeger. She also voiced Android 18 and Vados in the Bang Zoom! dub of Dragon Ball Super.

== Biography ==
She is associated with Bang Zoom! Entertainment and Funimation.

== Filmography ==
=== Anime ===
List of dubbing performances in anime
Year	Title	Role	Notes	Source
2015	Dragon Ball Super	Vados	Bang Zoom! dub	
2016	Case Closed	Chianti, Mrs. Sewa		
2016	Magi: Adventure of Sinbad	Falan, Merchant Girl		
2017	Dragon Ball Super	Android 18, Vados	Bang Zoom! dub	
2018	Gundam Build Divers	Rose		
2018	Sword Art Online Alternative Gun Gale Online	Drill Sergeant, Instructor	TV series	
2018	Sirius the Jaeger	Dorothea		
2020	Ishida & Asakura	Lady		
2020	Case Closed Episode One: The Great Detective Turned Small	Chianti, Mrs. Sewa	TV series	

=== Animation ===
List of voice performances in animation
Year	Title	Role(s)	Notes
2001	Man and Cat	Little Boy	Voice
2015	A Cautionary Tale	Little Red	Voice
2016	Monsters Dot Com	Monster	
2017	Destiny 2: Nerf Osiris	Brandy	
2017	Zoolaplex	Grandma	Additional voices
2017	For Honor: DLC Invasion	Peacekeeper	
2017	Breath of the Wild: Link and Sidon	Hylian	
2018	The Purge: Worst Wedding Ever	Tina, Tina's Mother, Wedding Guest	Additional voices
2019	Cuphead: Party Panic	Sally Stageplay	
2019	Accidental Fairy	Fairies	
2019	Rayman's Phantom Limb Freakout	Holly Luya	
2021	Secret History of Among Us	Pink	
2022	Mashed	Sally Stageplay	
2023	Sonic vs Rule 34 Collection (Volume 2)	Sonic's Mom	
2023	Among Us & Cuphead (Secret History Volume 4)	Pink	
2024	Tayo the Little Bus	Hana, Jeesie, Bong Bong, Rubby, Alice, Dragon Head 1, Kinder, Narrator, Various, Towing	Additional voices

=== Film ===
List of voice performances in direct-to-video and television films
Year	Title	Role	Notes	Source
2015	Love Live! The School Idol Movie	Girl	Additional voices	
2016	Asura: The City of Madness	Cha Seung-min	English dub	
2016	Case Closed: The Darkest Nightmare	Chianti	English dub	

=== Video games ===
List of voice performances in video games
Year	Title	Role	Notes	Source
2008	Vacant Sky Vol. I: Contention	Meraiden Altaya		
2010	Heroes of Newerth	High School Sweetheart, EXO Monarch, Punk Ravenor		
2013	Folk Tale	Willow / Crying Villager		
2013	Payday 2	Biker Enemy		
2014	Starpoint Gemini 2	Tiana T / Nova Rogers	PC	
2014	Fates Forever	Announcer		
2014	Smite	Tiamat	PlayStation 4, Xbox One	
2015	The Red Solstice	Nyx	PC	
2015	StormBorn: War of Legends	Althea, Female Wizard, Female Warrior		
2015	Ark: Survival Evolved	Female Player Character		
2015	Solarix	Betty		
2016	The Fifth Expedition	Female Advisor, Female 3, Female 4		
2016	MechRunner	Allison		
2016	Savage: Resurrection	Beast Commander		
2016	Shadowverse	Vira, Alexandrite Demon, Euryale	English version	
2017	Atelier Firis: The Alchemist and the Mysterious Journey	Nicola Mistlud, Nerke, Inn Keeper	English version	
2017	Shiness: The Lightning Kingdom	Chado, Mingane		
2017	ARK: Aberration	Female Player Character		
2017	Mafia City	Layla		
2017	Battle of Heroes	Azura, Fox Spirit, Aiko		
2017	Raw Data	Angel, Female Player Character, Adam		
2017	A Tale of Two Kingdoms: Deluxe Edition	Kreiche		
2017	Nelo	Charlie Squad Private 3		
2017	Danse Macabre: A Lover's Pledge Collector's Edition	Andrea Belmont		
2017	Phantasmat: Curse of the Mist Collector's Edition	Jane Forester		
2018	Myths of the World: Love Beyond Collector's Edition	Lorelei		
2018	Stellaris: Distant Stars	Female Character		
2018	Frequency Missing	Stephanie	PC	
2018	The Slater	Party ladies / Club Dancing Girl / Stripper		
2018	Heroes of Hammerwatch	Female Classes		
2018	Creepy Road	Angelina / Selfie Stick Girl	PlayStation 4	
2018	ARK: Extinction	Female Player Character		
2018	Evil Nun: The Horror's Creed	Sister Madeline		
2018	Myths of the World: Fire from the Deep Collector's Edition	Princess Hina, Fire		
2018	Door Kickers: Action Squad	Shield		
2019	Tether	Lesleigh, Peter		
2019	Slay the Spire	Female Characters	additional voices	
2019	AFK Arena	Witch / Wizards	Various	
2019	Eastshade	Aysun / Belinda / Owl Sister (voice)	PlayStation 4, PC	
2019	Phantasmat: Remains Of Buried Memories	Amelia		
2019	God's Trigger	Judy	PlayStation 4	
2019	Bannermen	Vanya		
2019	Thea 2: The Shattering	Various characters	additional voices	
2019	Age of Wonders: Planetfall	A.V.I.A, Van guard	PlayStation 4, Xbox One, PC	
2019	Memoirs of Murder: Behind the Scenes Collector's Edition	Mary Fletcher, Daughter		
2019	Pokémon Masters EX	Professor Bellis	English version, Tweet	
2020	Popup Dungeon	Thornette, Enola, Witch	PC	
2020	Into the Radius VR	Katya		
2020	Shadow Fight 4: Arena	Widow		
2020	Saint Kotar: The Yellow Mask	Lucija	PC	
2020	Dunk Lords	Gwen		
2020	Remothered: Broken Porcelain	Andrea Massino	PlayStation 4	
2020	Ice Scream 3: Horror Neighborhood	Sister Madeline		
2020	Granblue Fantasy Versus	Vira	PlayStation 4	
2020	Evil Nun 2: Origins	Sister Madeline, Children		
2020	Remothered Double Pack	Andrea Massino	PlayStation 4	
2020	Laxidaze	Yuki		
2021	Fallen Legion Revenants	Rayne, Kali, Evania, Burgundy	PlayStation 4	
2021	Cris Tales	Gladys, Dreena, Elizabeth, Firgara	PlayStation 4, Tweet	
2021	Hotel Architect	Receptionist	additional voices	
2021	Legends of Keepers	Dryad		
2021	Ice Scream 6 Friends: Charlie	Sister Madeline		
2021	Genshin Impact	Echoing Conch	PlayStation 5	
2021	Evil Nun Maze: Endless Escape	Sister Madeline		
2021	Horror Brawl: Terror Battle Royale	Sister Madeline	PC	
2022	Figment 2: Creed Valley	Singer	Nintendo Switch	
2022	Dislyte	Xia / Sakura		
2022	Granblue Fantasy Versus	Vira	PlayStation 4	
2022	Cosmonious High	Fren		
2022	Ice Scream 7 Friends: Lis	Sister Madeline		
2022	Tiny Tina's Wonderlands	Imelda	PlayStation 5	
2023	Path of the Midnight Sun	Rya	Nintendo Switch	
2023	Brixity	Brix		
2023	Ready or Not	Soldiers	Various	
2023	Evil Nun: The Broken Mask	Sister Madeline	PlayStation 4	
2023	Ice Scream 8: The Final Chapter	Sister Madeline		
2023	Granblue Fantasy Versus: Rising	Vira	PlayStation 5	
2024	Echo Wars – Road Rage	Meghan		
2024	No More Room in Hell 2	King F	PC	
2024	Albatroz	Isla	PlayStation 5	
2024	HeistGeist	Colonel Katarina Morova / Fay Morrigan	Nintendo Switch	
2024	Ambulance Life A Paramedic Simulator	Guide		
2025	Kathy Rain 2: Soothsayer	'JK' / Coma Stage Announcer / Page Voicer	PC	
2025	Shadowverse: Worlds Beyond	Battle Princess	English version	

== Awards and nominations ==
Year	Award	Category	Result	Title	Ref.
2022	Society of Voice Arts and Sciences Awards	Outstanding Video Game Character – Best Voiceover	Nominated	Remothered: Broken Porcelain	
