= Case Closed Episode One =

Sixth television special of Case Closed

- Case Closed Episode One: The Great Detective Turned Small
- North American key visual

名探偵コナンエピソード"ONE" 小さくなった名探偵 (Meitantei Konan Episōdo "Wan" Chīsakunatta Meitantei)
- Genre: Mystery; Thriller
- Created by: Gosho Aoyama
- Anime television film
- Directed by: Yasuichiro Yamamoto
- Produced by: Hidetaka Kondo; Keiichi Ishiyama; Michihiko Suwa; Yoshihiko Yonekura
- Written by: Yasuichiro Yamamoto; Hiroshi Kashiwabara
- Music by: Katsuo Ōno
- Studio: TMS/V1 Studio
- Licensed by: NA: Discotek Media
- Original network: NNS (ytv)
- Released: December 9, 2016
- Runtime: 94 minutes

Case Closed Episode One: The Great Detective Turned Small, known as Detective Conan Episode "ONE" – The Great Detective Turned Small (名探偵コナンエピソード"ONE" 小さくなった名探偵, Meitantei Konan Episōdo "Wan" Chīsakunatta Meitantei) in Japan, is the sixth animated television special of Case Closed. It was broadcast on the Nippon Television Network System on December 9, 2016. The special, whose subtitle is the same as the second chapter of the manga, serves as a retelling of the entire first and part of the second episodes of the original anime series. It has newly added story elements, not seen in those episodes.

== Plot ==
Sherry is seen entering a testing lab as she is working on a suspicious experiment for the Black Organization. As she views some live footage of test subjects on a computer screen, she calls her sister Akemi, telling her to come over, saying she will show her something interesting. A man walks into a bar called "Black Widow" and sits next to Vodka. Gin appears and says the Organization was having a rat problem. He also says the drink they were drinking was called "XYZ", a drink made from rum and lemon juice, which is mentioned to imply an "end". The man tries to flee by getting into his car, but it immediately explodes upon startup.

Ran and Shinichi see Genta, Ayumi and Mitsuhiko playing soccer. Ran questions why Shinichi left soccer, as he explains he wanted to develop the reflexes needed for being a detective and cites Sherlock Holmes whom he wants to emulate. At Sonoko's home, a guest, Takanori Sewa has been receiving threatening letters before his New Year's party. Shinichi offers Sewa his assistance, but he declines saying that he has already increased the number of guards.

During Ran's karate competition, Shinichi gets a call from the Inspector regarding a case and he has to leave urgently. Sewa's party has been interrupted by a murder: one of the guests, President Yamazaki of Yatsubishi Bank, was found dead with a knife that pierced through his heart. The police, led by Inspector Megure, investigate the crime scene, where Shinichi concludes the killer to be Sewa himself.

While Shinichi and Ran are enjoying themselves at Tropical Land, Shinichi runs off to inspect two suspicious men in black making a shady business deal. Gin knocks out Shinichi from behind, then forces him to take an experimental drug, which shrinks his body. After making it home, Shinichi asks Professor Agasa for help. Agasa warns that to stay safely hidden from the men in black, Shinichi can tell no one of his true identity–even Ran, who coincidentally shows up, intending to check on Shinichi. Agasa convinces her to look after Shinichi, who tells her his name is Conan Edogawa. On the way to her house, Ran's father Kogoro rushes outside on the trail of a case. He brags that he's been hired to find a CEO's daughter who was kidnapped by a "man in black". In the hope that it is a lead, Conan sneaks along, followed by Ran, who explains Conan's situation to Kogoro. Hoping each case he solves with Kogoro and Ran will lead him closer to the Black Organization, Conan stays with them going forward.

At Shinichi's House, Sherry and her team members search for whereabouts of Shinichi and Sherry finds that she already saw Shinichi when she came across in her car near the park. She also discovers that his childhood clothes are missing. In a busy New York street, Vermouth is talking to Gin while she is being followed by Jodie Starling and Shuichi Akai in a car behind them. Back at the lab, Sherry checks the list of persons need to be investigated and finds Shinichi's name where she enters "dead" in place of "unknown" and signs the sheet "SHERRY".

== Cast ==
Character	Japanese	English
Shinichi Kudo	Kappei Yamaguchi	Griffin Burns
Conan Edogawa	Minami Takayama	Wendee Lee
Ran Mori	Wakana Yamazaki	Cristina Vee
Kogoro Mori	Rikiya Koyama	Xander Mobus
Shiho Miyano/Sherry	Megumi Hayashibara	Erica Mendez
Akemi Miyano	Sakiko Tamagawa	Rebecca Davis
Ayumi Yoshida	Yukiko Iwai	Janice Kawaye
Mitsuhiko Tsuburaya	Ikue Ōtani	Erika Harlacher
Genta Kojima	Wataru Takagi	Andrew Russel
Sonoko Suzuki	Naoko Matsui	Minx Le
Shiro Suzuki	Fumio Matsuoka	Doug Stone
Hina Wada	Mikako Komatsu	Laura Stahl
Juzo Megure	Chafurin	Jake Eberle
Kazunobu Chiba	Isshin Chiba	Jason C. Miller
Wataru Takagi	Wataru Takagi	Christopher Bevins
Hiroshi Agasa	Kenichi Ogata	Michael Sorich
Eri Kisaki	Gara Takashima	Mari Devon
Yusaku Kudo	Hideyuki Tanaka	Keith Silverstein
Yukiko Kudo	Sumi Shimamoto	Erika Harlacher
Makoto Kyogoku	Nobuyuki Hiyama	Christian La Monte
Jodie Starling	Miyuki Ichijo	Maureen Price
Shuichi Akai	Shuichi Ikeda	Keith Silverstein
Gin	Yukitoshi Hori	D.C. Douglas
Vodka	Fumihiko Tachiki	Edward Bosco
Vermouth	Mami Koyama	Laura Post
Chianti	Kikuko Inoue	Tamara Ryan
Reiko	Shiho Kawaragi	Laura Stahl
Aiko	Asako Dodo	Debbie Gatton
Hitomi	Yuri Amano	Jeannie Tirado

== Music ==
- OP (Opening Theme) & ED (Ending Theme): "Mune ga Dokidoki" (胸がドキドキ, "The Pounding of My Heart") by ↑THE HIGH-LOWS↓
  - Lyrics & composition by Hiroto Komoto and Masatoshi Mashima
- IN (Insert Song): "Unmei no Roulette Mawashite" (運命のルーレット廻して, "Spinning the Roulette of Destiny") by Zard
  - Lyrics by Izumi Sakai
  - Composed by Seiichiro Kuribayashi

== Releases ==
On September 13, 2016, Episode One was announced as "the true first episode not seen by anyone!!" with new material advertised that was not previously in Gosho Aoyama's original manga or the original anime adaptation in 1996. The special was produced by TMS Entertainment and animated by its V1 Studio, as part of the Case Closed anime's 20th anniversary. It was shown in Japan on Yomiuri Television and Nippon Television on December 9, 2016. On TV, the special was among the top 3 watched for the week, earning a 10.7% rating. The special was also released in South Korea on February 8, 2017, as a theatrical film, where it grossed ₩999,362,100 (¥93,448,651 or $902,262 USD).

An English dub produced by Bang Zoom! Entertainment featuring a brand new voice cast was first shown at Chara Expo 2019 before being licensed by Discotek Media in May 2020 for home video. This marked the first Case Closed anime license in North America since Funimation lost the rights to the series in 2018 and the first English home video release in 10 years with the last being The Phantom of Baker Street in February 2010. However, unlike Funimation, Bang Zoom's dub does not contain the previously used Americanized names, opting to keep the original Japanese ones instead. Episode One was released on Blu-ray in Japan on December 22, 2017, and in North America on July 28, 2020. The special is also available for various digital streaming services such as Apple TV, Google Play, PlayStation Store, Amazon Prime Video, and Microsoft Store.

== Sequel ==
As part of the Case Closed anime's 30th anniversary, a new anime television film entitled Detective Conan Episode ZERO: The Shinichi Kudo Aquarium Case (名探偵コナン エピソード"ZERO" 工藤新一水族館事件, Meitantei Conan Episode "ZERO" Kudō Shinichi Suizokukan Jihen) was announced on September 19, 2025, and will air in January 2026. The film will be a retelling of Chapter 0 of the manga, titled "Awkward Couple", and the two-part anime episode, "Shinichi Kudo Aquarium Case", originally broadcast in 2015.
