= Sirius the Jaeger =

Japanese anime television series

- Promotional art for the series

天狼(シリウス) (Shiriusu)
- Genre: Action, thriller
- Anime television series
- Directed by: Masahiro Andō
- Produced by: Tomoyuki Ōwada; Hirotaka Kaneko; Sōji Miyagi; Masaru Seto; Ryōichi Ishibashi; Shōta Watase; Yūichirō Shiji
- Written by: Keigo Koyanagi
- Music by: Masaru Yokoyama
- Studio: P.A. Works
- Licensed by: Netflix (expired)
- Original network: AT-X, Tokyo MX, BS11
- Original run: July 12, 2018 – September 27, 2018
- Episodes: 12
- icon

Sirius the Jaeger (Japanese: 天狼(シリウス), Hepburn: Shiriusu) is a Japanese original anime television series produced by P.A. Works. The series is directed by Masahiro Andō and premiered from July 12 to September 27, 2018.

== Plot ==
In 1930, a group of Vampires leave China and flee to Japan. They are followed by a group of vampire hunters called "Jaegers" under the cover of being staff of the "V Shipping Company". Among them is a young "Sirius" man called Yuliy, a werewolf whose home village was destroyed by "Vampires". In the past, a member of the Sirius royal family was chosen by oracle to be the agent of God and permitted to possess a mysterious holy relic known as "The Ark of Sirius" which, as a gift from God, could exert power over all things. Because of its potential the Sirius people came under attack from groups seeking its power so it was sealed away in a secret location, never to be used again. Yuliy and the Jaegers engage in a deadly battle with the Vampires for possession of the relic.

== Characters ==
=== Jaegers ===
Jaegers are vampire hunters who use the cover of the "V Shipping Company" for their operations.

Yuliy "Yuriychka" Jirov (ユーリィゲロフ, Yūri Gerofu)
Voiced by: Yūto Uemura (Japanese); Khoi Dao (English)
The main character. A 17-year-old Sirius werewolf and member of the Jaegers. He is the son of the Sirius Alexei and a human woman, Sachi, and has an older brother Mikhail. He is normally calm, but is ruthless when fighting vampires because they destroyed his home village of Dogville and wiped out its inhabitants. He wields a three-section staff with retractable blades at each end. He has black hair with a white streak and a short ponytail and sometimes his eyes glow bright blue.
Willard (ヴィラード, Wirādo)
Voiced by: Kenyu Horiuchi (Japanese); Ray Chase (English)
An ex-Archeologist and Commander of the V Companies "Jaegers". In the past he deciphered an ancient book recovered from the ruins of the Sirius civilization and traced the Ark of Sirius to Dogville, leading to its destruction when the Vampires tried to find the Ark. He has white hair and wears a monocle over one eye. He is 41 years old.
Dorothea (ドロテア, Dorotea)
Voiced by: Nanako Mori (Japanese); Tamara Ryan (English)
Willard's right-hand woman and firearms expert. She is Spanish and 27 years old. She has black hair, tan skin, and green eyes.
Philip (フィリップ, Firippu)
Voiced by: Yūsuke Kobayashi (Japanese); Erik Scott Kimerer (English)
A 14-year-old British boy of the Jaegers. He has blond hair and a hatred for the Sirius because a werewolf killed his parents.
Fallon (ファロン, Faron)
Voiced by: Shunsuke Takeuchi (Japanese); Xander Mobus (English)
A 26-year-old member of the Jaegers. He is a tall and bulky Irishman with waist length red hair and a good-natured personality.

=== Vampires ===
The Vampires operate under the cover of the Alma Corporation and seek the "Ark of Sirius" to possibly cure a degenerative disease which is killing them. Vampires are either Royals who can use their powers while still in human form, or former humans called Slaves who must transform into beasts to access their powers.

Yevgraf
Voiced by: Kenjiro Tsuda (Japanese); Ben Diskin (English)
He is a Royal Vampire and king of the Vampire Clan. He is leading the search for the "Ark of Sirius" for his own purposes.
Kershner
Voiced by: Takehito Koyasu (Japanese); DC Douglas (English)
The second highest ranking Vampire with great ambitions. He has blond hair and wields a long thin sword.
Agatha
Voiced by: Sayaka Ohara (Japanese); Allegra Clark (English)
A female Vampire who has been drinking the blood of young men for 140 years to stay young. She has dark hair cut into a bob and grey eyes that glow red.
Larissa and Tamara
Voiced by: Misaki Watada (Larissa), Sayaka Senbongi (Tamara) (Japanese); Jackie Lastra (Larissa), Jennifer Losi (Tamara) (English)
Larissa and Tamara are ruthless twin vampires. Larissa dies after Bishop catches up to her, as she's escaping, and shoots her. Tamara joins Yulily on his journey.
Mikhail Jirov
Voiced by: Takahiro Sakurai (Japanese); Billy Kametz (English)
He is the older brother of Yuliy and became a vampire after being bitten by Yevgraf while defending his brother. He is a maverick within the Vampire clan and he is used by Yevgraf in his search for the "Arc of Sirius". He has white hair, grey eyes and a scarred face.

=== Others ===
Jiro Akimoto
Voiced by: Hinata Tadokoro (Japanese); Landon McDonald (English)
The owner of a bar and an agent of the V Company. He has straight black hair in a ponytail.
Baron Naoe
Voiced by: Eizou Tsuda (Japanese); Jake Eberle (English)
He is the father of Ryoko and provides a base for the Jaegers in Japan.
Ryoko Naoe
Voiced by: Rie Takahashi (Japanese); Reba Buhr (English)
The young daughter of Baron Naoe who develops an interest in Yuliy and assists the Jaegers. Although shy, she has trained in kenjutsu and is a competent swordswoman and carries a Katana.
Hideomi Iba
Voiced by: Junji Majima (Japanese); Greg Chun (English)
A Major in the Imperial Army who is investigating the murders committed by Vampires. He works undercover as a reporter for the Monthly Competent Crimes.
Kakizaki
Voiced by: Yasuhiro Mamiya (Japanese); Paul St. Peter (English)
Chief of the Japanese army's Weapons Department. He commits suicide after mistakenly becoming involved in the Alma company's test of the Alma Company's artificial humanoid weapon and losing a battalion of infantrymen.
Mamoru Akasaka
Voiced by: Takaya Hashi (Japanese); Richard Epcar (English)
A hermit living near Sakhalin, at the site of the former Sirius civilization. 15 years earlier he was sent by the Japanese army to find and acquire the Ark of Sirius, but disappeared.
Bishop
Voiced by: Kenji Hamada (Japanese); Grant George (English)
A former Jaeger, now working for the British government. He was bitten and became a Vampire, but seeks vengeance against the Vampires for killing his comrades.
Klarwein
Voiced by: Nobuo Tobita (Japanese); Joe Ochman (English)
A scientist allied with the Vampires. Part of his face and scalp is missing and he is obsessed with creating artificial life. He created an artificial humanoid weapon from human body parts for the Alma Corporation.
Momosei Naotora
Voiced by: Taiten Kusunoki (Japanese); Jason Marnocha (English)
Leader of the Hyakko Party who wear masks and target war profiteers, wealthy people and academics. He assisted the Vampires to gather the material they needed to create artificial humanoid weapon.

== Production and release ==
The anime aired from July 12 to September 27, 2018, and is broadcast on AT-X, Tokyo MX, BS11, and Tulip TV. The series is directed by Masahiro Andō and written by Keigo Koyanagi, with animation by studio P.A. Works. The original character designs are provided by Kinu Nishimura, and Mai Matsuura and Souichirou Sako are adapting the designs for animation, as well as serving as chief animation directors for the series. Music for the series is composed by Masaru Yokoyama. Infinite produced the anime.

Shiho Takeuchi is in charge of the series' concept design. Masahiro Sato is the action animation director, Junichi Higashi and Ayumi Satō are the art directors, and Kazuto Izumida is the director of photography. The series is edited by Ayumu Takahashi. Mika Sugawara is in charge of the color setting, and Tariki Kiritani serves as the series 3D animation director. Jin Aketagawa is the sound director for the series.

The opening theme song is "Sirius" (シリウス, Shiriusu) by Kishida Kyoudan & The Akeboshi Rockets, and the ending theme song is "Hoshie" (星絵; "Star Drawing") by Sajou no Hana. Licensed by Netflix, the anime was made available on the streaming service on December 21, 2018.

No.	Title (Note: All English titles are taken from the anime's official website.)	Original release date
1	"The Revenant Howls in Darkness"; Transliteration: "Yomigaerishimono, Yoru ni Warau" (Japanese: 蘇えりし者、夜に嗤う)	July 12, 2018
A team of Jaegers follow a group of Vampires from China to Japan using the V shipping company as their cover. A series of atrocious crimes begin to occur in the Imperial City which are blamed on the escaped convict, Kuratake. However, he is in fact a prisoner of the Vampires who are the real perpetrators. The Jaeger Yuliy finds the Vampire Agatha, and the Jaegers gives chase, but just as Yuliy is about to kill her, he is shot by the Vampire Mikhail.
2	"Deprived Talent"; Transliteration: "Mōshuu Suru Kiiroi Hana" (Japanese: 妄執する黄色い華)	July 19, 2018
The scientist Hanada Kisuke treats Yuliy's wound at his manor until Yuliy recovers and the Jaeger spends time with Hanada's young daughter, Saki. However, Agatha leads a group of Vampires in an attack on the manor seeking Hanada's artificial heart research. She bites Hanada, turning him into a Vampire before she is killed by Yuliy who then stops Hanada just before he bites his own daughter. Yuliy gives chase to the fleeing Vampires but is stopped by Mikhail.
3	"Indelible Memories"; Transliteration: "Tokenai Yuki" (Japanese: とけないゆき)	July 26, 2018
Following the incident with Dr. Hanada, Yuliy recalls his childhood in the remote mountain village of Dogville. He lived peacefully with his family however, vampires attacked the village seeking the Arc of Sirius. They murdered the villagers, including his mother, but Yuliy was saved by his brother Mikhail who sacrificed his own humanity by becoming a vampire. Yuliy only survived by unconsciously transforming into a werewolf. Now Yuliy is torn between his loyalty to his brother and his anger the Vampire his brother has become.
4	"Beginning of Trickery"; Transliteration: "Bōryaku no Ari" (Japanese: 謀略の蟻)	August 2, 2018
The Vampires cease supporting the Hyakko Party as they have all the materials they need. Willard checks out the weapons manufacturer Alma Corporation and finds they plan a military exercise in Shizuoka to test a new weapon for Major General Kakizaki, chief of the Weapons Department. At the Vampire headquarters, Yevgraf fails to convince the Vampire hierarchy that it is worth finding the Arc of Sirius. Momosei Naotora leads the Hyakko Party on a raid on the Alma offices searching for Kershner, killing all the staff, but finds that they are humans, not Vampires. In Shizuoka, the Alma weapon turns out to be an artificial humanoid weapon which wipe out an entire infantry battalion. Kakizaki immediately travels back to Imperial city, but due to a number of coincidences, Yuliy, Dorothea, Ryoko and Hideomi Iba are also on the same train. Yuliy is surprised to encounter Mikhail on board.
5	"The Frankenstein"; Transliteration: "Araburu Tekkan" (Japanese: 荒ぶる鉄棺)	August 9, 2018
Yuliy reunites with his brother Mikhail who says that Yuliy should forgo his revenge against Vampires otherwise they will eventually have to fight each other. Iba learns from Kakizaki about the Alma weapon and that it may be on the train to the city. Meanwhile, Momosei Naotora and the Hyakko party attack the train searching for Kershner. They encounter the artificial humanoid weapon created by Klarwein who commands it to kill Naotora. The Jaegers, Philip and Fallon join the train and assist in the fight against the Hyakko Party while Iba encounters his first Vampire after Ryoko kills it. Meanwhile, Yuliy is attacked by the artificial humanoid weapon, but Mikhail intervenes and kills it just as the train comes to a crashing halt.
6	"Mockingbird's Song"; Transliteration: "Maneshi Tsugumi no Keiteki" (Japanese: マネシツグミの警笛)	August 16, 2018
Klarwein rants at Mikhail's destruction of his artificial humanoid but Kershner is more concerned about the location of the Arc of Sirius and extermination of the Jaegers. After Iba meets Jirou Akimoto seeking information, Vampires follow Jirou to his bar and kill him. Later, a large number of Vampires converge on the Naoe family house, heavily outnumbering the Jaegers. In the midst of the battle, Kershner enters and attacks Yuliy, calling him the living Sirius while Mikhail disarms Philip.
7	"True Confession"; Transliteration: "Ada Teki no Honō, no Koku" (Japanese: 讐敵の炎、哭白の刻)	August 23, 2018
In the midst of Yuliy and Kershner's fight, the army intervenes and opens fire on the Vampires. Kershner breaks of the combat, ordering Mikhail to kill Yuliy. Mikhail reveals that Yuliy is the Sirius, and that the Ark was taken by their father years ago when he left their village. Kershner tells Yuliy how Professor Willard was responsible for the destruction of Dogville by assisting the Vampires track the Ark. Confronted by this information, Yuliy releases his beast-like nature and violently kills Kershner with a piece of his own sword. Yuliy then confronts Willard, furious over his years of deception. Later, Willard explains that Yuliy's father must have taken and hidden the Arc of Sirius and that Yevgraf is the one who truly desires it. Meanwhile, Iba is assigned to find the Ark and Yuliy departs alone for Sakhalin following reports that Yevgraf has been seen there.
8	"The Sanctuary of Sirius"; Transliteration: "Maneshitsugumi no Keiteki" (Japanese: マネシツグミの警笛)	August 30, 2018
Yevgraf arrives at Sakhalin, site of the former Sirius civilization and suspected location of the Arc of Sirius. He takes Mikhail into a cavern where they find an impenetrable seal, a pool of boiling red liquid at its center. However, Mikhail is unable to break it and they leave. Meanwhile, Yuliy meets Bishop, a suspicious former Jaeger also searching for the Ark who has lost his team to Vampires. As they approach the cavern, they encounter a hermit who is being attacked by a group of Vampire slaves and the Vampire twins, Larissa and Tamara.
9	"Father's Shadow"; Transliteration: "Zankon no Hōbai" (Japanese: 残痕の朋輩)	September 6, 2018
Bishop and Yuliy chase off the Vampires, but the hermit refuses to reveal any information about the Ark. Back at Sakhalin, they meet Ryoko and Iba who reveals that the hermit is the former Captain Akasaka Mamoru who, 15 years earlier he was sent to find and acquire the Ark of Siruis, but had never returned. On a second visit to the hermit's cabin, Yuliy and Iba convince Mamoru to reveal the location of the Ark. The next morning Bishop and Yuliy head off alone to find the Ark.
10	"Memories of the Abyss"; Transliteration: "Shin'en ni Samayō ōkami" (Japanese: 深淵にさまよう狼)	September 13, 2018
At the ruined village of Dogville, Willard explains the nature of the Arc of Sirius to the Jeagers. Using the ancient text, he opens a hidden panel and finds a shrine from which extracts a small colorful orb which may assist if the seal of the Ark is broken. Meanwhile, Klarwein attacks Yuliy and Bishop with a hoard of artificial humanoids constructed from the dying Vampire slaves. However, during the battle an avalanche claims Klarwein along with his creations. Yuliy and Bishop find the entrance to the Sirius cavern, and Yuliy steps into the boiling red liquid at its center. He sees a vision of the past when Mamoru saved him and Mikhail from a bear and was welcomed into the village by Alexei. Alexei convinced the elder Gustav to allow him to seal the Ark away at its origin in Sakhalin to prevent it ever being used again. Yuliy meets his father who says that his soul forever resides within the seal to protect it. However, Yuliy convinces his father to give him the Ark as a tool to enable all races to coexist.
11	"Calling in Blood"; Transliteration: "Hōkō no Utage" (Japanese: 咆哮の宴)	September 20, 2018
As Yuliy and Bishop exit the chamber with the Ark, a small colorful orb, they meet Ryoko and Iba. Bishop is forced to reveal that he is both a British agent and a Vampire, however Yuliy agrees to work with him to defeat the Vampires. As Yuliy emerges from the cave system, he is met by the Vampire twins and Mikhail who is now controlled by Yevgraf via a blood pact. Mikhail attacks Yuliy and takes the Ark, passing it to the twin Larissa. Mikhail slowly regains control of his body from Yevgraf. The brothers finally reconcile, but Mikhail begins to succumb to the Vampire disease. Meanwhile, Bishop kills Larissa and grabs the Ark, but is then confronted by Yevgraf. The Vampire takes the Ark and kills him, then escapes to his airship flying overhead. Yevgraf then swallows the glowing orb, hoping to become the Ark of Vampires.
12	"The Ark of Sirius"; Transliteration: "Tenrō no Hako" (Japanese: 天狼の匣)	September 27, 2018
From their airplane, Fallon and Philip manage to drop Willard onto Yevgraf's airship and he brings it low enough for Yuliy to jump aboard. Yuliy confronts Yevgraf who now plans to be the progenitor of a new generation of Vampires and he transforms into a more fearsome being. Mikhail attacks Yevgraf, while Willard hands Yuliy the counterpart orb from the Sirius shrine which can control the Ark. Yuliy joins Mikhail in fighting Yevgraf who begins to degenerate under the power of the Ark, and Mikhail manages to extract it from Yevgraf's body. The savage fight continues until Mikhail finally kills Yevgraf, but Mikhail succumbs from his wounds and dies in Yuliy's arms. Yuliy then leaves with the world chasing him, including the Jaegers. Later, Yuliy and the remaining Vampire twin Tamara, travel to negotiate peace with the Vampire elders to achieve reconciliation between the Vampires, Sirius and humans.
