= Ishura =

Japanese light novel series and its franchise

- First light novel volume cover

異修羅
- Genre: Action; Dark fantasy
- Novel series
- Written by: Keiso
- Published by: Kakuyomu; Shōsetsuka ni Narō
- Original run: June 30, 2017 – present
- Light novel
- Written by: Keiso
- Illustrated by: Kureta
- Published by: ASCII Media Works
- English publisher: NA: Yen Press
- Imprint: Dengeki no Shin Bungei
- Original run: September 17, 2019 – present
- Volumes: 10
- Manga
- Written by: Keiso
- Illustrated by: Meguri
- Published by: Kodansha
- Imprint: Monthly Shōnen Magazine Comics
- Magazine: Monthly Shōnen Magazine
- Original run: March 5, 2021 – May 7, 2024
- Volumes: 4
- Anime television series
- Directed by: Takeo Takahashi (Note: Credited as Chief Director (総監督, Sō Kantoku)); Yuki Ogawa
- Written by: Kenta Ihara
- Music by: Masahiro Tokuda
- Studio: Passione (Note: Animation Production (アニメーション制作)); Sanzigen (Note: CG Animation Production (CGアニメーション制作))
- Licensed by: Disney Platform Distribution
- Original network: Tokyo MX, BS NTV, KBS Kyoto, SUN, Nagoya TV, HTB, RKB, Miyatere, TV Shizuoka, TUT, Fukui TV, AT-X (S1 & 2); NBC (S1); NIB, NKT (S2)
- Original run: January 3, 2024 – March 26, 2025
- Episodes: 24
- icon

Ishura (Japanese: 異修羅) is a Japanese light novel series written by Keiso. It originated on the novel posting websites Kakuyomu and Shōsetsuka ni Narō, before being acquired by ASCII Media Works, who published the series with illustrations by Kureta under their Dengeki no Shin Bungei imprint. As of December 2024, ten volumes have been released. A manga adaptation with illustrations by Meguri was serialized in Kodansha's Monthly Shōnen Magazine from March 2021 to May 2024, with its chapters collected in four tankōbon volumes. An anime television series adaptation produced by Passione aired from January to March 2024. A second season aired from January to March 2025.

== Plot ==
The demon king is dead. However, the host of "Shuras", demi-god-like people capable of felling him, remain and are now effectively free to do whatever they want, with some becoming conquerors while others wander, indifferent to the world around them. Thus, with the identity of the one who slew the demon king being a mystery, these champions now spark conflicts among themselves, all to determine who is the mightiest and attain the title of "True Hero".

== Characters ==
=== Shuras ===
Soujiro the Willow-Sword (柳の剣のソウジロウ, Yanagi no Tsurugi no Sōjirō)
Voiced by: Yuki Kaji (Japanese); Griffin Burns (English)
A boy who was transported from another world. He is an unbelievably strong swordsman, capable of defeating an army by himself, who travels the world looking for worthy opponents. However, his extraordinary strength also makes him indifferent to ordinary people's struggles.
Alus the Star Runner (星馳せアルス, Hoshihase Arusu)
Voiced by: Jun Fukuyama (Japanese); Kyle McCarley (English)
A mutant wyvern possessing an additional three arms with opposable fingers that allow him to wield weapons, making him unmatched in the air. Being from a naturally greedy species, he seeks ever greater wealth and glory.
Dakai the Magpie (鵲のダカイ, Kasasagi no Dakai)
Voiced by: Sōichirō Hoshi (Japanese); Yuri Lowenthal (English)
A former bandit who was originally transported from another world. He now works for the New Principality of Lithia as its primary enforcer and spy.
Regnejee the Sunset Wings (夕暉の翼レグネジィ, Sekki no Tsubasa Regunejī)
Voiced by: Showtaro Morikubo (Japanese); Brent Mukai (English)
A wyvern possessing a genius intellect who raised his flock into a powerful army. He has a strong bond with Curte, the adoptive daughter of the New Principality of Lithia's governess, prompting him to lend the city-state his forces and serve it as its finest general.
Kia the World Word (世界詞のキア, Sekaishi no Kia)
Voiced by: Aoi Yūki (Japanese); Abby Trott (English)
A young elf wizard of immeasurable power, capable of altering reality with her words alone. However, having been born and raised within the elven community all her life, she is very naive regarding the outside world, unaware that her mentor, Elea, is using her for her own ends.
Nihilo the Vortical Stampede (濫回凌轢ニヒロ, Rankai Ryōreki Nihiro)
Voiced by: Rie Takahashi (Japanese); Cat Protano (English)
A revenant created by a demon lord. She used to be held captive by Aureatia until she accepted a plea deal: her freedom in exchange for aiding in the nation's war against the New Principality of Lithia.
Shalk the Sound Slicer (音斬りシャルク, Otogiri Sharuku)
Voiced by: Koichi Yamadera (Japanese); Josh Petersdorf (English)
An undead skeleton mercenary renowned for his incredible speed. He is currently employed with the New Principality of Lithia.
Higuare the Pelagic (海たるヒグアレ, Umitaru Higuare)
Voiced by: Tomokazu Sugita (Japanese); Khoi Dao (English)
A mandrake gladiator hired by the New Principality of Lithia. Though a monster and a skilled killer, renowned for his endless string of victories in the arena, he is well-mannered and speaks politely.
Kuze the Passing Disaster (通り禍のクゼ, Tōri-ka no Kuze)
Voiced by: Shin-ichiro Miki (Japanese); Robbie Daymond (English)
A paladin seeking to revive his dying order by working dangerous missions as an assassin. In reality, however, his powers entirely stem from his angelic partner, Nastique, who is the actual Shura rather than him.
Nastique the Quiet Singer (静かに歌うナスティーク, Shizuka ni Utau Nasutīku)
Voiced by: Yui Horie
Kuze's angelic partner and the source of his powers, invisible to anyone but him. She is the actual Shura between them and holds authority over death itself, immediately killing anyone who threatens him regardless of strength.
Mele the Horizon's Roar (地平砲メレ, Chiheihō Mere)
Voiced by: Rikiya Koyama (Japanese); Talon Warburton (English)
A Gigant archer who serves as the protector of Sine Riverstead.
Linaris the Obsidian (黒曜リナリス, Kokuyō Rinarisu)
Voiced by: Nao Tōyama (Japanese); Valeria Rodriguez (English)
A vampire who is the leader of the Obsidian Eyes.
Toroa the Awful (おぞましきトロア, Ozomashiki Toroa)
Voiced by: Daisuke Ono (Japanese); Eliah Mountjoy (English)
A swordsman who possesses several magical swords.
Mestelexil the Box of Desperate Knowledge (窮知の箱のメステルエクシル, Kyūchi no Hako no Mesuteru Ekushiru)
Voiced by: Ayumu Murase (Japanese); Debi Derryberry (English)
A construct created by Kiyazuna the Axle.
Hiroto the Paradox (逆理のヒロト, Gyakuri no Hiroto)
Voiced by: Megumi Ogata (Japanese); Michael Lorz (English)
A gray-haired child who possesses excellent conversation skills. Said skills have led to him having connections with influential people.

=== Aureatia ===
Aureatia (黄都, Koto lit. the Golden Capital) is the largest nation in the setting. It is governed by 29 Officials.

Jelky the Swift Ink (速き墨ジェルキ, Hayaki Sumi Jeruki)
Voiced by: Takehito Koyasu (Japanese); Jeff Leach (English)
Ranked as the third official. A refined man who often collaborates with Hidow.
Hargent the Silencer (静寂なるハルゲント, Seijaku Naru Harugento)
Voiced by: Akio Otsuka (Japanese); Jason Marnocha (English)
Ranked as the sixth general. A military general within the Aureatia Kingdom's military. He has a close yet strained relationship with Alus, having saved the mutant wyvern when he was young but later growing to regret this after learning of the latter's exploits.
Elea the Red Tag (赤い紙箋のエレア, Akai Shisen no Erea)
Voiced by: Mamiko Noto (Japanese); Mara Junot (English)
Kia's mentor who is teaching her to control her abilities. In truth, however, she is Aureatia's seventeenth official, being head of the nation's spy network, and plans to use her protégé's talents to advance her political agenda. However, as they spend more time together, she slowly grows to genuinely care for her.
Enu the Distant Mirror (千里鏡のエヌ, Senrikyō no Enu)
Voiced by: Ryōta Ōsaka (Japanese); Barrett Leddy (English)
The Thirteenth Minister of the Twenty-Nine Officials of Aureatia.
Hidow the Clamp (鎹のヒドウ, Kasugai no Hidō)
Voiced by: Nobuhiko Okamoto (Japanese); Kevin Andrew Rivera (English)
Ranked as the twentieth official. A young aristocrat and minister from Aureatia who is also Kuze's employer.

=== New Principality of Lithia ===
New Principality of Lithia (リチア新公国, Lichia Shinkouku) is a city-state seeking independence from Aureatia.

Taren the Punished (警めのタレン, Imashime no Taren)
Voiced by: Romi Park (Japanese); Tara Platt (English)
The governess of Lithia and formerly the twenty-third general of Aureatia. Following pleas from her people for their city to become independent, she defected and began gathering powerful allies in preparation for a war for secession. In the end, her rebellion is squashed and Kuze and Nastique kill her.
Curte the Clear Sky (晴天のカーテ, Seiten no Kāte)
Voiced by: Sora Amamiya (Japanese); Valerie Rose Lohman (English)
Taren's blind adoptive daughter who shares a close relationship with Regnejee, unaware that he is a wyvern due to her disability. She is killed by Alus when she is hit by the same attack that killed Regnejee, learning of his true nature in her final moments but accepting him regardless.
Lana the Moon Tempest (月嵐のラナ, Getsuran no Rana)
Voiced by: Yumiri Hanamori (Japanese); Kimberly Woods (English)
An intelligence agent working for the New Principality of Lithia by recruiting powerful allies. In reality, however, she is a double agent working for Aureatia, relaying information back to them. She is also an acquaintance of Elea and is killed by her after she learns of Kia's existence.

=== Others ===
Yuno the Distant Talon (遠い鉤爪のユノ, Tōi Kagizume no Yuno)
Voiced by: Reina Ueda (Japanese); Cassandra Lee Morris (English)
A former inhabitant of the Nagan Labyrinth City, which was destroyed by golems. Despite being saved by Soujiro, she greatly resents his apathy toward the weak and offers to guide him around the world in hopes of finding someone who can kill him, though she gradually lets go of her hatred as their journey goes on.
Kuuro the Cautious (戒心のクウロ, Kaishin no Kūro)
Voiced by: Mariya Ise (Japanese); Casey Mongillo (English)
A leprechaun who used to be an assassin for the Obsidian Eyes.
Cuneigh the Wanderer (彷いのキュネー, Mayoi no Kyunē)
Voiced by: Miku Itō (Japanese); Kimiko Glenn (English)
A winged homunculus who is Kuuro's companion.
Kiyazuna the Axle (軸のキヤズナ, Jiku no Kiyazuna)
Voiced by: Kujira (Japanese); Leslie Wadsworth (English)
A self-proclaimed Demon King who created Mestelexil the Box of Desperate Knowledge.

== Media ==
=== Light novels ===
The series is written by Keiso. It originated as a web novel published on the Kakuyomu novel website on June 30, 2017. It then appeared on the Shōsetsuka ni Narō website as well on July 2, 2017. It was later acquired by ASCII Media Works, who published the series under their Dengeki no Shin Bungei imprint. The first volume was released on September 17, 2019. As of December 2024, ten volumes have been released.

In September 2021, Yen Press announced that it had licensed the series for an English publication, releasing the first volume on May 3, 2022. Its imprint Yen Audio began to release an English audiobook of the novel on October 10, 2023. It features the voices of Chris Guerrero and Emily Bauer.

==== Volumes ====
No.	Title	Original release date	English release date
1	The New Demon King War; Shin Maō Sensō (新魔王戦争)	September 17, 2019; 978-4-04-912564-1	May 3, 2022; 978-1-9753-3786-5
2	The Particle Storm in the Realm of Slaughter; Sakkai Mijin Arashi (殺界微塵嵐)	March 17, 2020; 978-4-04-912895-6	September 6, 2022; 978-1-9753-3788-9
3	Voiceless Calamity; Zessoku Musei-ka (絶息無声禍)	August 12, 2020; 978-4-04-913205-2	March 21, 2023; 978-1-9753-3790-2
4	Judgement of Light and Shadow; Kōin Eiyū Kei (光陰英雄刑)	February 17, 2021; 978-4-04-913532-9	July 18, 2023; 978-1-9753-3792-6
5	Grotesque Seeds Lay Dormant; Senzai Igyōshu (潜在異形種)	September 17, 2021; 978-4-04-913739-2	December 12, 2023; 978-1-9753-6307-9
6	Glory Usurper; Eikō Sandatsu-sha (栄光簒奪者)	July 15, 2022; 978-4-04-914157-3	March 26, 2024; 978-1-9753-6944-6
7	Frozen Finale; Kkō Shūkyoku-ten (決凍終極点)	February 17, 2023; 978-4-04-914864-0	July 23, 2024; 978-1-9753-7669-7
8	Blades of the Heretics; Rangun Gedōken (乱群外道剣)	October 17, 2023; 978-4-04-915172-5	November 19, 2024; 979-8-8554-0831-7
9	Den of Divine Tragedies; Kyō Yō Zōshoku su (凶夭増殖巣)	February 16, 2024; 978-4-04-915466-5	June 10, 2025; 979-8-8554-1086-0
10	The Martyr Walks Alone; Junkyō to Ko Gyō (殉教徒孤行)	December 17, 2024; 978-4-04-915829-8	January 27, 2026; 979-8-8554-2444-7

=== Manga ===
A manga adaptation illustrated by Meguri was serialized in Kodansha's Monthly Shōnen Magazine from March 5, 2021, to May 7, 2024. Kodansha collected its chapters in four tankōbon volumes, released from July 16, 2021, to June 17, 2024.

==== Volumes ====
No.	Release date	ISBN
1	July 16, 2021	978-4-06-523797-7
2	December 16, 2021	978-4-06-525794-4
3	December 15, 2023	978-4-06-527776-8
4	June 17, 2024	978-4-06-535670-8

=== Anime ===
An anime television series adaptation was announced on February 12, 2023. It was produced by Passione and directed by Yuki Ogawa, with chief direction by Takeo Takahashi, assistant direction by Takuya Asaoka, Fujiaki Asari, Takahiro Majima and Hironori Aoyagi, scripts written by Kenta Ihara, characters designed by Yoko Kikuchi and Yuka Takashina, music composed by Masahiro Tokuda, and CG animation produced by Sanzigen. The series aired from January 3 to March 20, 2024, on Tokyo MX and other networks. The opening theme song is "Shura ni Otoshite" (修羅に堕として; Falling into the Carnage), performed by Sajou no Hana, while the ending theme song is "Hakka" (白花; White Flower), performed by Konomi Suzuki. The series is streaming on Disney+ (via Star) worldwide and on Hulu in United States.

Following the airing of the final episode, a second season was announced, which aired from January 8 to March 26, 2025. The opening theme song is "True Peak", performed by Mayu Maeshima, while the ending theme song is "The Iolite", performed by Sajou no Hana.

==== Episodes ====
===== Season 1 (2024) =====
No. overall	No. in season	Title	Directed by	Storyboarded by	Original release date
1	1	"Soujiro the Willow-Sword"; Transliteration: "Yanagi no Tsurugi no Sōjirō" (Japanese: 柳の剣のソウジロウ)	Takuya Asaoka	Takeo Takahashi	January 3, 2024
2	2	"Alus the Star Runner"; Transliteration: "Hoshihase Arusu" (Japanese: 星馳せアルス)	Fujiaki Asari	Yuki Ogawa	January 10, 2024
3	3	"Dakai the Magpie and Regnejee the Wings of Sunset"; Transliteration: "Kasasagi no Dakai to Sekki no Tsubasa Regunejī" (Japanese: 鵲のダカイと夕暉の翼レグネジィ)	Takahiro Majima	Naruse Takahashi	January 17, 2024
4	4	"Nihilo the Vortical Stampede and Kia the World Word"; Transliteration: "Rankai Ryōreki Nihiro to Sekaishi no Kia" (Japanese: 濫回凌轢ニヒロと世界詞のキア)	Hironori Aoyagi	Takashi Sano	January 24, 2024
5	5	"Higuare the Pelagic and Nastique the Quiet Singer"; Transliteration: "Umitaru Higuare to Shizuka ni Utau Nasutīku" (Japanese: 海たるヒグアレと静かに歌うナスティーク)	Fujiaki Asari & Satoshi Saga	Ikuo Morimoto	January 31, 2024
6	6	"Gathering of Factions"; Transliteration: "Jin'ei Shūketsu" (Japanese: 陣営集結)	Hironori Aoyagi	Naruse Takahashi	February 7, 2024
7	7	"War Commences"; Transliteration: "Kōsen Kaishi" (Japanese: 交戦開始)	Takahiro Majima	Ikuo Morimoto	February 14, 2024
8	8	"The New Demon King War"; Transliteration: "Shin Maō Sensō" (Japanese: 新魔王戦争)	Hiroki Moritomo & Shunichi Katō	Yuki Ogawa	February 21, 2024
9	9	"Fire From the Sky"; Transliteration: "Sora Kara no Senka" (Japanese: 空からの戦火)	Fujiaki Asari	Ikuo Morimoto	February 28, 2024
10	10	"Vanishing Calamity"; Transliteration: "Kieru Saiyaku" (Japanese: 消える災厄)	Takahiro Majima	Takashi Sano	March 6, 2024
11	11	"When the Sun Sets"; Transliteration: "Rakujitsu no Toki" (Japanese: 落日の時)	Hironori Aoyagi	Naruse Takahashi	March 13, 2024
12	12	"Shura" (Japanese: 修羅)	Hironori Aoyagi	Naruse Takahashi	March 20, 2024

===== Season 2 (2025) =====
No. overall	No. in season	Title	Directed by	Storyboarded by	Original release date
13	1	"Mele the Horizon's Roar"; Transliteration: "Chiheihō, Mere" (Japanese: 地平咆、メレ)	Takahiro Majima	Takeo Takahashi	January 8, 2025
14	2	"Linaris the Obsidian"; Transliteration: "Kokuyō, Rinarisu" (Japanese: 黒曜、リナリス)	Hironori Aoyagi	Naruse Takahashi	January 15, 2025
15	3	"Toroa the Awful and Mestelexil the Box of Desperate Knowledge"; Transliteration: "Ozomashiki Toroa to Kyūchi no Hako no Mesuteru Ekushiru" (Japanese: おぞましきトロアと窮知の箱のメステルエクシル)	Fujiaki Asari	Naruse Takahashi	January 22, 2025
16	4	"Atrazek the Particle Storm, Part One"; Transliteration: "Mijin Arashi Atorazeku Zenpen" (Japanese: 微塵嵐アトラゼク・前篇)	Tatsuya Ishiguro	Naruse Takahashi	January 29, 2025
17	5	"Atrazek the Particle Storm, Part Two"; Transliteration: "Mijin Arashi Atorazeku Kōhen" (Japanese: 微塵嵐アトラゼク・後篇)	Takahiro Majima	Ikuo Morimoto	February 5, 2025
18	6	"Rosclay the Absolute"; Transliteration: "Zettainaru Rosukurei" (Japanese: 絶対なるロスクレイ)	Fujiaki Asari	Naruse Takahashi	February 12, 2025
19	7	"Lucnoca the Winter and Psianop the Inexhaustible Stagnation"; Transliteration: "Fuyu no Rukunoka to Mujin Muryū no Saianopu" (Japanese: 冬のルクノカと無尽無流のサイアノプ)	Hironori Aoyagi & Yuki Ogawa	Takashi Sano	February 19, 2025
20	8	"Uhak the Silent"; Transliteration: "Fugon no Uhaku" (Japanese: 不言のウハク)	Satoshi Saga & Shunichi Katō	Ikuo Morimoto	February 26, 2025
21	9	"Kazuki the Black Tone"; Transliteration: "Kuroi Neiro no Kazuki" (Japanese: 黒い音色のカヅキ)	Takahiro Majima	Naruse Takahashi	March 5, 2025
22	10	"Tu the Magic"; Transliteration: "Mahō no Tsū" (Japanese: 魔法のツー)	Fujiaki Asari	Naruse Takahashi	March 12, 2025
23	11	"Hiroto the Paradox"; Transliteration: "Gyakuri no Hiroto" (Japanese: 逆理のヒロト)	Hironori Aoyagi	Yuki Ogawa & Kenji Setō	March 19, 2025
24	12	"Shiki, Enemy of All"; Transliteration: "Subete no Teki, Shiki" (Japanese: 全ての敵、シキ)	Takahiro Majima	Yuki Ogawa	March 26, 2025

== Reception ==
Chiriuchi Taniguchi from Real Sound offered the series praise, specifically stating it has a great cast of characters and unique storytelling.

In the Kono Light Novel ga Sugoi! guidebook, the series ranked first in the tankōbon in 2021, receiving the most votes for any series in the history of the guidebook.

== See also ==
- Demon Lord 2099, another light novel series illustrated by the same artist
