= Leaving Lyndow =

2017 first person adventure video game

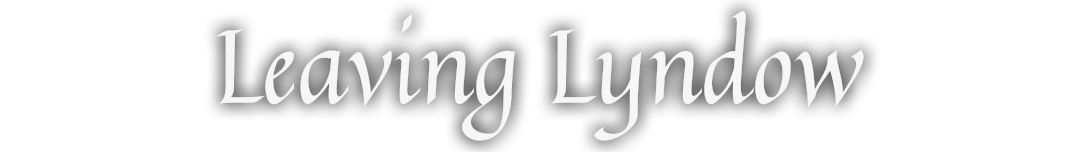
- Developer: Eastshade Studios
- Publisher: Eastshade Studios
- Designer: Daniel Weinbaum
- Composer: Phoenix Glendinning
- Series: Eastshade
- Engine: Unity
- Platforms: Windows, macOS, PlayStation 4
- Release: February 8, 2017
- Genre: Adventure
- Mode: Single-player

Leaving Lyndow is a short first person adventure video game developed and published by Eastshade Studios. The game is the predecessor of the open-world adventure game Eastshade. While set in the same setting as the larger title, it features distinct game mechanics and story. The game was announced January 11, 2017, less than a month prior to its release on February 8, 2017. To avoid confusion with Eastshade, which was in development at the time, the developer released a short video explaining the reasoning and history behind the small titles' odd format and development.

== Plot ==
Leaving Lyndow take place on the island of Eastshade. You play as Clara, who has recently graduated from the Guild of Maritime Exploration, and are preparing to embark on a long and dangerous research expedition. Throughout the game, you speak to her friends and family, learning about their feelings regarding your departure.

It's Clara's last day on the island where she grew up. With high honors, she's graduated and fulfilled her childhood dream of joining the Guild of Maritime Exploration. She needs to complete preparations, visit her favorite places, and say her goodbyes - before leaving on a journey she may not return from. *Dangerous journey not included*

The game's story concerns the events immediately prior to Clara's departure, not the journey itself.

== Gameplay ==
The game is played from the first-person perspective. While it features some light puzzle elements and mini-games, the bulk of the interaction in the game manifests through dialog trees. There is some player choice in the order the player visits the environments, but other than this, the game is mostly linear, and has an immutable ending.

== Development ==
Eastshade Studios stopped development of their larger title Eastshade to make Leaving Lyndow, with plans to continue Eastshade once Leaving Lyndow released. The Developer mentioned in a video addressed to fans of Eastshade that the reasons for Leaving Lyndow's development were three-fold: They wanted experience shipping a game before attempting to ship their much larger title Eastshade, they wanted to use Leaving Lyndow's revenue to supplement Eastshade's funding, and they thought the game would enrich the Eastshade universe.

While the game uses much of the assets and technology from Eastshade, story content had to be made uniquely, and some of the environments were made unique for the title. The game's development took about six months.

== Reception ==
Reception

Aggregate score
Aggregator	Score
Metacritic	74/100

Leaving Lyndow received "mixed or average" reviews according to review aggregator Metacritic. The game's most common criticism was that it was too short.

Kotaku's Nathan Grayson said "It's the sort of thing that anybody who's ever left home can identify with, and it helped me come to terms with some goodbyes I'll probably need to say soon." VideoGamer's Alice Bell praised the game for having intelligently written characters. Polygon's Colin Campbell applauded the game's "niceness".

CGMagazine's Lane Martin criticized the game for being somewhat of a paid commercial, albeit a beautiful and fascinating one. He closed his review with "Leaving Lyndow is a beautiful experience in a fascinating world, but may be more of a 45-minute-long commercial for the upcoming Eastshade than an actual game."

OnlySP's Damien Lawardorn said Leaving Lyndow lacked characterization and thematic depth, but praised its world-building and mentioned it promises better things on the horizon.
