= Gatton family =

The Gatton or de Gatton family were an Anglo-Norman land-owning dynasty from Gatton in Surrey. Beginning with Hemfrid de Gatton they held significant parts of South-East England, particularly in Kent, Sussex and Surrey during the 11th, 12th and 13th centuries.

== Significant members ==
- Hemfrid de Gatton (born 1094, died: unknown)
- Hamo de Gatton (born 1125, Gatton, died: 1165)
- Robert de Gatton (born 1147, Gatton, died: 1190)
- Hamo de Gatton (born 1170, Gatton, died: 1216)

Robert de Gatton and the family lineage are mentioned in Edward Hasted's 1798 History of Kent thus:

In the reign of king Henry III. Robert de Gatton, who took his name from the lordship of Gatton, in Surry [sic], of which his ancestors had been some time owners, was in possession of the manor Thrule, and died in the 38th year of that reign, holding it by knight's service of the king, of the honor of Peverel, by reason of the escheat of that honor, &c. (fn. 2) He was succeeded in it by this eldest son Hamo de Gatton, who resided here, and served the office of sheriff in the 14th year of Edward I. His eldest son of the same name left one son Edmund, then an infant, who afterwards dying under age, his two sisters became his coheirs, and divided his inheritance, of which Elizabeth entitled her husband William de Dene to this manor, and all the rest of the estates in Kent; and Margery entitled her husband Simon de Norwood to Gatton, and all the other estates in Surry.
