= List of Mob Psycho 100 episodes =

Key visual for the series

Mob Psycho 100 is a Japanese anime series based on the manga series created by One. The anime adaptation was produced by Bones and directed by Yuzuru Tachikawa. Hiroshi Seko wrote the scripts, Yoshimichi Kameda designed the characters, and Kenji Kawai composed the music. The series aired between July 12 and September 27, 2016, on Tokyo MX. For season 1, the opening theme song, titled "99", was performed by Mob Choir, while the ending theme song, titled "Refrain Boy" (リフレインボーイ, Rifurein Bōi), was performed by All Off. The series was simulcast on Crunchyroll, while Funimation broadcast the show's simuldub. The English dub was produced by Bang Zoom! Entertainment. On April 18, 2019, Funimation and Crunchyroll confirmed that season 2 would simuldub on April 25.

A second season of the anime series was announced, with the staff and cast returning to reprise their roles. Mob Psycho 100 II aired from January 7 to April 1, 2019, with the series being simulcast on Crunchyroll.

A third season, titled Mob Psycho 100 III, was confirmed to be in production in October 2021. It aired from October 6 to December 22, 2022. The third season's simuldub was slated to be produced by Crunchyroll rather than Bang Zoom! with some roles recast, due to the choice to move dub production to in-person recording sessions at their Dallas based studio, rather than remote recordings, after largely relying on the latter at the start of the COVID-19 pandemic. Among the planned recastings was the voice of Mob, Kyle McCarley, who stated that he would likely not be reprising the role as Crunchyroll had refused to negotiate a potential union contract for future anime dubbing productions with McCarley's union SAG-AFTRA. McCarley had offered to work non-union on season 3 under the condition that Crunchyroll have a discussion with SAG-AFTRA, but since this did not proceed, McCarley did not return. This news prompted much backlash and criticism of Crunchyroll on social media.

== Series overview ==
Season	Episodes	Originally released	
Season	Episodes	First released	Last released
1	12	July 12, 2016	September 27, 2016
2	13	January 7, 2019	April 1, 2019
3	12	October 6, 2022	December 22, 2022

== Episodes ==
=== Season 1 (2016) ===
No. overall	No. in season	Title (Note: All English titles are taken from Crunchyroll)	Storyboarded by (Note: Information is taken from the ending credits of each episode.)	Directed by	Written by	Original release date	English air date	Ref.
1	1	"Self-Proclaimed Psychic: Arataka Reigen ~And Mob~"; Transliteration: "Jishō Reinōryokusha: Reigen Arataka ~to Mob~" (Japanese: 自称霊能力者・霊幻新隆～とモブ～)	Yuzuru Tachikawa	Yuzuru Tachikawa	Hiroshi Seko	July 12, 2016 (Note: The series premiered on July 11, 2016, on Tokyo MX at 00:00 JST, which is effectively July 12)	October 27, 2018	
Reigen Arataka, a self-proclaimed exorcist and fraud, encounters an evil spirit, combating it only with ineffective throws of table salt which serve to annoy the entity, prompting him to summon his secret weapon: his middle school employee, the immensely powerful esper Shigeo Kageyama, or "Mob", who effortlessly banishes the spirit. On a subsequent job to cleanse a tunnel of evil spirits, Reigen again relies on Mob to perform the exorcism; one of the spirits, a deceased biker gang leader, warns them of a more powerful monster deeper within, but Mob confronts and defeats the creature, allowing the trapped spirits to find peace and pass on to the afterlife.
2	2	"Doubts about Youth ~The Telepathy Club Appears~"; Transliteration: "Aoi Haru no Gimon ~Nōkan Denpa-bu Tōjō~" (Japanese: 青い春の疑問～脳感電波部登場～)	Yoshitomo Yonetani	Takefumi Anzai	Hiroshi Seko	July 19, 2016	November 3, 2018	
Facing disbandment for low membership, the Telepathy Club's leader, Tome Kurata, tries to recruit Mob, arguing with Reigen over the phone. On a subsequent job, Reigen and Mob cross-dress to exorcise a spirit at an all-girls school; Reigen is caught by security while Mob, guided by two students, finds and defeats the ghost of a schoolboy. The next day, as Mob considers joining the Telepathy Club, the student council threatens to give its room to the new Body Improvement Club, prompting Mob to join the latter instead.
3	3	"An Invitation to a Meeting ~Simply Put, I Just Want to be Popular~"; Transliteration: "Tsudoi e no Sasoi ~Kantan ni Iu to Motetai~" (Japanese: 集いへの誘い～簡単に言うとモテたい～)	Yuzuru Tachikawa	Katsuya Shigehara	Hiroshi Seko	July 26, 2016	November 10, 2018	
During Body Improvement Club practice, Mob faints and is left to recover in the clubroom, which now also stores the Telepathy Club and its equipment; they comment that he will never be popular, deeply upsetting him. On his way home, a woman in a smiling mask intercepts him, promising to make him popular and leading him to an underground cult, (LOL), which serves a man with the power to force laughter and smiles. The cult's leader, the spirit Dimple possessing a human, converts a school reporter but fails to convert Mob. Revealing his true form, Dimple attempts to kill him, but the strain causes Mob to reach 100% emotional capacity, unleashing an explosive burst of psychic power that exorcises Dimple and frees all the brainwashed cult members.
4	4	"Idiots Only Event ~Kin~"; Transliteration: "Baka Onrī Ibento ~Dōrui~" (Japanese: 馬鹿オンリーイベント～同類～)	Yuzuru Tachikawa	Tomoaki Ōta	Hiroshi Seko	August 2, 2016	November 24, 2018	
A turf war erupts between delinquents from Salt Middle School and their rivals from Black Vinegar Middle School. When the Black Vinegar delinquents summon their leader, the physically unimposing but psychically powerful Teruki "Teru" Hanazawa, he easily defeats the Salt group. Seeking revenge, Salt leader Tenga Onigawara tries to recruit the Body Improvement Club; after being rejected, he orchestrates Mob's kidnapping to force their involvement. Mob, who is being followed by the weakened and supposedly reformed spirit Dimple, is captured but refuses to use his powers to escape. The Body Improvement Club fights through the delinquents to rescue him but is ultimately overpowered by Teru, who reveals his own potent psychic abilities.
5	5	"Ochimusha ~Psychic Powers and Me~"; Transliteration: "Ochimusha ~Chōnōryoku to Boku~" (Japanese: OCHIMUSHA～超能力と僕～)	Ken'ichi Fujisawa	Ken'ichi Fujisawa	Hiroshi Seko	August 9, 2016	December 1, 2018	
Recognizing Mob's abilities, Teruki Hanazawa attacks him to force a psychic duel, but Mob refuses to fight back due to his principle of never using powers on people. After exorcising the intervening spirit Dimple, Teru's assault escalates until Mob unconsciously deflects a knife attack, shearing off Teru's hair and fracturing his sanity. While being strangled, Mob understands that Teru's hatred stems from their shared insecurity and dependence on psychic abilities. Losing consciousness from asphyxiation, Mob awakens in an unconscious "???%" state that violently dismantles the school and defeats Teru, who apologizes and accepts Mob's ideals. Afterward, filled with regret for breaking his own rule, Mob enters a state of "100% sadness" and uses his powers to rebuild the school.
6	6	"Discord ~To Become One~"; Transliteration: "Fuchōwa ~Naru Tame ni~" (Japanese: 不調和～成るために～)	Takefumi Anzai	Takefumi Anzai	Hiroshi Seko	August 16, 2016	December 8, 2018	
Following the incident at Black Vinegar Middle School, rumors about Mob's psychic abilities and his fight with Teru spread throughout the town. This attracts unwanted attention to his brother, Ritsu Kageyama, who resents his own lack of psychic power. The Telepathy Club's leader, Tome, investigates the fight and pressures Mob to identify other espers publicly. Meanwhile, the student council president, Shinji Kamuro, conspires with Ritsu to frame local gang leader Tenga Onigawara for theft and perversion. While touring a psychic research facility, the Awakening Lab, Ritsu witnesses only minimal abilities in its subjects. Unbeknownst to him, he psychically bends a spoon and later sees the ghost of Dimple outside his home, revealing his own latent esper powers.
7	7	"Exaltation ~I've Obtained Loss~"; Transliteration: "Kōyō ~Sōshitsu o Teniireta~" (Japanese: 昂揚～喪失を手に入れた～)	Takashi Kawabata	Takashi Kawabata	Hiroshi Seko	August 23, 2016	December 15, 2018	
Rumors of "White T-Poison" attract rival middle school gangs, while Ritsu Kageyama, guided by the spirit Dimple, hones his newly discovered psychic abilities. He uses this power to exact revenge on the manipulative student council president, Shinji Kamuro. Meanwhile, Mob is targeted by con-artists accusing him of breaking a valuable vase, but Reigen intervenes and expertly turns the tables on the scammers. Empowered by his growing abilities, Ritsu develops a superiority complex and ignores Dimple's warnings to challenge Teruki Hanazawa. Teru's experience and refined power nearly overwhelm him, forcing Ritsu to retreat. He later vents his frustration by effortlessly subduing a gang of thugs in an alley, just as Mob arrives on the scene.
8	8	"The Older Brother Bows ~Destructive Intent~"; Transliteration: "Ani Peko ~Hakai Ishi~" (Japanese: 兄ペコ～破壊意思～)	Yuzuru Tachikawa, Katsuya Shigehara	Yūji Ōya	Hiroshi Seko	August 30, 2016	January 6, 2019 (Note: Adult Swim moved Mob Psycho 100 from 11:30 p.m. to 12:30 a.m. EST/PST, making the air dates of the remaining episodes of season 1 effectively Sunday.)	
Teru leads Mob to Ritsu, who is asserting his new psychic dominance over defeated thugs. Mob is thrilled for his brother, but concerned by his arrogance. When Ritsu tries to sever their bond, Mob shocks him by groveling to the thugs in apology. The situation is interrupted by Claw esper Cadre Koyama, who attacks after mistaking Ritsu for his target. Hurting Ritsu triggers Mob's 100% rage, but Koyama uses a cursed spray to knock him out and abducts Ritsu. Another Claw agent, Yusuke Sakurai, simultaneously kidnaps the subjects of the Awakening Lab. Teru and Dimple take the unconscious Mob to safety, where they identify the kidnappers as members of Claw, a criminal esper organization. The trio questions the lab's founder for information while Koyama delivers Ritsu to Claw's Seventh Division base.
9	9	"Claw ~7th Division~"; Transliteration: ""Tsume" ~Dai Nana Shibu~" (Japanese: "爪"～第7支部～)	Katsumi Terahigashi	Yōko Kanemori	Hiroshi Seko	September 6, 2016	January 13, 2019	
Claw agent Terada attempts to execute Koyama and Sakurai for failing to capture Mob, but is himself captured by Mob and Teruki and forced to reveal Claw's plans. At the Seventh Division base, the imprisoned Ritsu and Awakening Lab children are terrorized by Scar member Muto, who uses hypnotism to fake the death of one child. Mob and Teruki infiltrate the base just as the children begin their escape. Mob easily defeats Koyama, prompting the full deployment of the Scars—Claw's elite esper cadre.
10	10	"The Heinous Aura ~Mastermind~"; Transliteration: "Kyoaku no Ōra ~Kuromaku~" (Japanese: 巨悪のオーラ～黒幕～)	Hiroshi Kobayashi	Katsuya Shigehara	Hiroshi Seko	September 13, 2016	January 20, 2019	
The escaped children reunite with Kaito, while Dimple—possessing a Claw underling—intervenes to help. Teruki is informed of their escape and confronts Miyagawa, tricking him into defeating himself with his own powers before being overwhelmed by Muto and Sakurai. Mob breaks through Mukai's doll assault and reluctantly defeats Tsuchiya after she insists he not hold back because she is a woman; he then overpowers Takeuchi. The fleeing children encounter a mysterious boy named Shou. Ritsu stays behind to cover their escape and is later found beaten and unconscious by Mob. When Muto attempts to psychologically break Ritsu, Mob enters a "100% rejection" state that shatters Muto's mind, leaving both unconscious. Meanwhile, Dimple's attempt to deceive Matsuo fails, resulting in his capture.
11	11	"Master ~Leader~"; Transliteration: "Shishō ~Rīdā~" (Japanese: 師匠 ~Leader~)	Takefumi Anzai	Takefumi Anzai	Hiroshi Seko	September 20, 2016	January 27, 2019	
Tracking Mob's phone, Reigen arrives at the Seventh Division and is mistaken by the guards for the leader of Claw. He uses this misunderstanding to help the Awakening subjects escape and persuades many low-level members to abandon the organization. Meanwhile, Mob, Teruki, and Ritsu are trapped in a power-suppressing room until Reigen frees them. Their escape is blocked by division leader Ishiguro and the three remaining Scars. Reigen learns Mob broke his promise by using his powers on people and advises him to flee rather than fight, prioritizing his well-being over guilt. As Mob nears a state of 100% murderous intent, Reigen calmly talks him down, urging self-preservation. A flashback reveals their first meeting, when a young Mob sought Reigen's help to control his abilities. Suddenly, Sakurai strikes Reigen down from behind, shocking Mob into unleashing his full power at 100%.
12	12	"Mob and Reigen ~A Giant Tsuchinoko Appears~"; Transliteration: "Mob to Reigen ~Kyodai Tsuchinoko Genru no Maki~" (Japanese: モブと霊幻～巨大ツチノコ現るの巻～)	Yuzuru Tachikawa	Yuzuru Tachikawa	Hiroshi Seko	September 27, 2016	February 3, 2019	
Miraculously unharmed, Reigen faces the Scars, his body impervious to their psychic attacks due to Mob having subconsciously channeled his own power into him—a manifestation of "1000% Gratitude" stemming from Reigen's earlier advice. After overpowering Ishiguro, Reigen rebukes the Scars for their superiority complex, insisting that espers are still human. His words reach Sakurai and Muraki, but Ishiguro rejects this, asserting esper supremacy. Mob counters that psychic abilities do not equate to popularity, provoking Ishiguro to attempt destroying the entire facility. As Reigen's borrowed power fades, Shou abruptly appears and defeats Ishiguro, revealing he was sent by his father, Claw's leader, before departing. Dimple escapes and subdues Matsuo. The group resumes normal life; during a later search for the mythical Tsuchinoko, Reigen collects mushrooms while Mob exorcises a spirit alleged to be the creature, though Reigen maintains it does not exist.

=== Season 2 (2019) ===
No. overall	No. in season	Title	Storyboarded by	Directed by	Written by	Original release date	Ref.
13	1	"Ripped Apart ~Someone Is Watching~"; Transliteration: "Biribiri ~Darekaga Mite iru~" (Japanese: ビリビリ ～誰かが見ている～)	Takefumi Anzai	Yūji Ōya	Hiroshi Seko	January 7, 2019	
Reigen takes a job exorcizing a spirit on a farm, which Mob accomplishes by psychically controlling the plants. Meanwhile, after the disgraced student council president Kamuro resigns, Mob is convinced to run for office but fails spectacularly when he freezes during his speech. He later receives a confession from a girl named Emi, who reveals she only asked him out on a dare. When her friends mock her and destroy her novel, Mob intervenes, uses his powers to reassemble the book, and confesses he is an esper—a display witnessed by Tsubomi, who is impressed, and which inspires Emi to write a story about a psychic middle schooler.
14	2	"Urban Legends ~Encountering Rumors~"; Transliteration: "Toshi Densetsu ~Uwasa to no Sōgū~" (Japanese: 都市伝説 〜噂との遭遇〜)	Katsuya Shigehara	Katsuya Shigehara	Hiroshi Seko	January 14, 2019	
Reigen and Mob are hired to debunk emerging urban legends, facing competition from rival psychic Banshoumaru Shinra. Reigen demonstrates how ordinary occurrences are misinterpreted as supernatural, such as a "Human-Faced Dog" revealed to be a pet with a face drawn on by children. However, one legend proves to be real—an actual evil spirit—which Mob promptly exorcises. Following these events, Reigen decides to establish a website for his psychic consultancy business.
15	3	"One Danger After Another ~Degeneration~"; Transliteration: "Kasaneru Kiken ~Henshitsu~" (Japanese: 重ねる危険 ～変質～)	Ken'ichi Fujisawa	Ken'ichi Fujisawa	Hiroshi Seko	January 21, 2019	
Reigen's new website brings success, including a troubling request to curse someone; though he initially refuses, he placates the client with a false charm. Mob is unsettled by the desire to harm others. Their next job leads them to a woman's apartment, where the alleged spirit is actually a neighbor using out-of-body experiences to spy on her; he is arrested, and Mob is confused by the woman's shift from fear to disgust. When college students hire them for protection during a spirit photoshoot but refuse to pay, they later return in panic—the spirit photo is real—and promise payment. At the site, Mob finds three peaceful spirits of a deceased family who simply wish to remain together. The students demand exorcism despite Mob's protests, and though Dimple tries to provoke the spirits into evil, they refuse. Seeing Mob's distress, Reigen understands that Mob sees spirits and humans as equals and that rapid job exposure has strained his worldview. Reigen performs a fake exorcism to satisfy the clients and consoles Mob, who later wonders what would happen if he ever chose to curse someone—and whether anyone could stop him—before falling asleep.
16	4	"Inside ~Evil Spirit~"; Transliteration: "Nakami ~Akuryō~" (Japanese: 中身 ～悪霊～)	Masahiro Mukai, Yuzuru Tachikawa	Shōhei Miyake	Hiroshi Seko	January 28, 2019	
Reigen and Mob are hired by the wealthy Masashi Asagiri to exorcise his daughter Minori, joining a group of rival psychics including Banshoumaru and Kirin Jodo of the Sun Psychic Union. Asagiri explains that Minori is possessed and has been confined. After Reigen wins the right to see her first through rock-paper-scissors, she initially appears normal, leading others to suspect abuse—but Reigen detects inconsistencies in her speech, provoking the spirit to reveal itself as Keiji Mogami, a former psychic recognized by Dimple. While the other psychics attempt and fail to exorcise Mogami, Mob disregards Dimple's warnings and enters Minori's mind through an out-of-body experience, leaving his physical form under Dimple's control. Inside her mental world, Mogami demonstrates his absolute control, stripping Mob of his powers and defeating him. He explains that psychic abilities are emotion-driven, with negative emotions being more potent, and reconstructs the mental world into a twisted version of Mob's life where he has no powers, friends, or family.
17	5	"Discord ~Choices~"; Transliteration: "Fuwa ~Sentaku~" (Japanese: 不和 ～選択～)	Hakuyu Go	Hakuyu Go	Hiroshi Seko	February 4, 2019	
Mogami reveals his past: he worked extreme jobs to save his ill mother, who died nonetheless, driving him to suicide to become the ultimate evil spirit. In the mental world, Minori joins Mob's class and orchestrates relentless bullying against him. While only 30 minutes pass in reality, Mob endures six months of powerlessness and mounting despair. After failing to save a stray cat from torment, Mob is provoked into fighting back. Dimple, having helped the other psychics escape, enters Minori's mind to aid Mob, restoring his memories just as he begins to unleash his power. Mogami then reveals the mental world's inhabitants are spirits he absorbed, which he sends to attack Mob. Drawing on 100% courage, Mob defeats the spirits, but their released collective overwhelms him until he reaches ???%, obliterating the mental world. Awakening in his own body, Mob watches Mogami depart—only to be captured by Matsuo. Minori wakes and tearfully apologizes; Mob forgives her, having learned that people can change and that his own life has been shaped for the better by those around him.
18	6	"Poor, Lonely, Whitey"; Transliteration: "Kodokuna Howaitī" (Japanese: 孤独なホワイティー)	Takefumi Anzai	Takahiro Hasui	Yuzuru Tachikawa	February 11, 2019	
After Mob ends their partnership upon realizing Reigen has been exploiting his psychic abilities, Reigen reflects on his lonely existence but resolves to continue his business independently. He begins filming his exorcism process, sharing free online tutorials to expose psychic frauds and offering life advice, which earns him a positive reputation as "Seasoning City's bro". His growing fame leads to magazine features and a television appearance offer. Unbeknownst to him, the show is a trap orchestrated by Kirin Jodo of the Sun Psychic Union, who holds a grudge against Reigen from the Mogami incident and intends to publicly expose him as a fraud.
19	7	"Cornered ~True Identity~"; Transliteration: "Oikomi ~Shōtai~" (Japanese: 追い込み ～正体～)	Yuzuru Tachikawa	Tsuyoshi Tobita	Yuzuru Tachikawa	February 18, 2019	
During a live television appearance orchestrated by Kirin Jodo to discredit him, Reigen is tricked into attempting to exorcise a child actor, fully exposing his lack of psychic abilities and humiliating him publicly. The scandal ruins his reputation, sparking widespread rumors and even forming a group of self-proclaimed "victims". Mob hears the news but remains unbothered, trusting it is part of his master's plan. As reporters and detectives pursue him, Reigen holds a press conference where he is aggressively questioned. When asked why he entered the supernatural business, he reflects on meeting Mob three years earlier—a moment that inspired him to continue. Regretting how he used Mob, he smiles at the camera and says, "You have grown up". Suddenly, the building shakes and cameras float midair, startling the media who believe Reigen is responsible. He ignores the chaos and walks out. Later, meeting Mob and Dimple, Reigen asks if Mob now knows his true nature. Mob calmly replies that he always knew: Reigen is a good person.
20	8	"Even Then ~Continue Forward~"; Transliteration: "Soredemo ~Mae e~" (Japanese: それでも ～前へ～)	Yūji Ōya	Yūji Ōya	Hiroshi Seko	February 25, 2019	
Mob trains for his school's marathon with support from friends and Reigen, hoping to place in the top ten and confess to his crush, Tsubomi. During his training, Ritsu and Teru assist Reigen in his absence. Tsubomi and a friend visit the office seeking relationship advice; she tests Reigen by asking about a crush, having recognized a photo of him with Mob. On race day, Mob perseveres through an injury but finishes around 74th and collapses before the end. Waking to praise from his teacher about his personal growth, he feels a sense of accomplishment. Later, as Ritsu waits at home, Shou Suzuki—an esper from Claw—appears unexpectedly. When Mob returns, he finds his house burned to the ground with charred bodies inside, triggering an immediate and catastrophic emotional overload, pushing him into the ???% state.
21	9	"Show Me What You've Got ~Band Together~"; Transliteration: "Misete Miro ~Shūgō~" (Japanese: 見せてみろ ～集合～)	Hiroshi Takeuchi	Hiroshi Takeuchi	Hiroshi Seko	March 4, 2019	
On the brink of emotional explosion, Mob is calmed by Dimple, who reveals the charred bodies were fakes. Enraged, Mob hunts for the espers responsible, encountering two Scars from Claw's main branch who are also searching for him but know nothing about his family. Koyama and Sakurai arrive with a newly formed alliance—including esper children from the Awakening Lab, most former Scars of the Seventh Division, and Reigen—to unite against Claw, which is preparing a full-scale assault on the city while eliminating all opposition. Reigen reassures Mob of his parents' safety, allowing him to calm down and fall asleep. Meanwhile, Claw's leader, Toichiro Suzuki, mobilizes his forces; Hatori of the Ultimate Five hijacks television signals to broadcast Toichiro's declaration of world domination. Shou Suzuki leads a separate resistance, recruiting Ritsu and safeguarding Mob's parents. Toichiro then dispatches Shimazaki of the Ultimate Five to capture the Prime Minister, a task he accomplishes effortlessly. Teru intervenes but is decisively defeated by Shimazaki's superior teleportation abilities despite a valiant effort.
22	10	"Collision ~Power Type~"; Transliteration: "Shōtotsu ~Pawā-Kei~" (Japanese: 衝突 ～パワー系～)	Katsuya Shigehara	Katsuya Shigehara	Hiroshi Seko	March 11, 2019	
As the group moves to infiltrate Claw's occupied tower, Toichiro dispatches Shibata of the Ultimate Five and a team of espers to locate and eliminate the still-sleeping Mob. Reigen manages to subdue the lesser espers but unintentionally enrages Shibata, transforming him into a relentless powerhouse determined to destroy Mob. Dimple possesses Mob's body to flee, but when Shibata threatens a crowd—including Tsubomi—he is forced to fight back. After Shibata violently launches Mob's body into the Body Improvement Club, its members try to intervene but are quickly overwhelmed. Only Musashi remains, declaring that Mob's perseverance inspired their courage and vowing to protect him. Dimple then possesses Musashi, fully unleashing his latent muscular power to surpass even Shibata's psychically-enhanced strength. Mob finally awakens and decisively defeats Shibata.
23	11	"Guidance ~Psychic Sensor~"; Transliteration: "Shidō ~Kanchi Nōryoku-sha~" (Japanese: 指導 ～感知能力者～)	Itsuki Tsuchigami	Itsuki Tsuchigami	Hiroshi Seko	March 18, 2019	
On his way to Claw's tower, Mob battles a group of Claw espers until Minegishi of the Ultimate Five intervenes. Matsuo arrives to assist Mob but loses the flask containing Mogami, which the espers shatter—releasing a furious and overpowered Mogami. As Mogami prepares to kill Minegishi, Mob pleads for his life, insisting Minegishi can still change. Mogami relents, advising Mob to be stricter with others to become unbeatable, then departs. Meanwhile, the rest of Mob's allies are intercepted and swiftly defeated by Shimazaki. Shou and Ritsu reach the tower; Shou proceeds alone while Ritsu stays to fight Shimazaki. Just as Shimazaki is about to deliver a final blow, Teru and the former Scars arrive for a coordinated counterattack. Despite a valiant effort, Shimazaki overwhelms them all after escalating his power. Sensing Mob's approach in his heightened state, Shimazaki turns to confront him—but is unexpectedly defeated by Reigen. Forced to retreat, Shimazaki flees as Mob continues alone to confront Toichiro at the tower.
24	12	"The Battle for Social Rehabilitation ~Friendship~"; Transliteration: "Shakaifukki-sen ~Yūjō~" (Japanese: 社会復帰戦 ～友情～)	Atsushi Takahashi	Toshiyuki Sone, Yuzuru Tachikawa	Hiroshi Seko	March 25, 2019	
After effortlessly defeating Hatori, Shou confronts his father Toichiro but is soundly overpowered. Toichiro reveals the nature of his abilities—able to store and transfer psychic energy—and drains the defeated Claw soldiers around him to demonstrate. He recounts his childhood, where his immense power bred a sense of superiority, fueling his delusional quest for global domination. Meanwhile, Mob frees the Prime Minister and encounters Serizawa, the most powerful of the Ultimate Five. Once a reclusive shut-in, Serizawa found purpose under Toichiro but is swayed by Mob's empathy and offer of friendship. Mob then confronts Toichiro directly, but despite his efforts, cannot reason with the power-obsessed leader. As Toichiro moves to kill Mob, Reigen intervenes with a punch that is dodged; Serizawa barely saves Reigen from a lethal counterattack. Mob reaches 100% emotion, and in the ensuing chaos, Reigen, Serizawa, and Shou are safely lowered to the ground alongside Ritsu and the other allies. Toichiro taunts Mob as weak, but Mob declares that with his friends now safe, he can finally unleash his full rage without restraint.
25	13	"Boss Fight ~The Final Light~"; Transliteration: "Bosu-sen ~Saigo no Hikari~" (Japanese: ボス戦 ～最後の光～)	Shinji Satō	Yūji Ōya, Yuzuru Tachikawa	Hiroshi Seko	April 1, 2019	
Mob gradually shifts through various 100% emotional states, pressuring Toichiro to unleash his own power at maximum output. This causes Toichiro to lose control, transforming into a living bomb capable of annihilating the entire city. Demonstrating profound compassion, Mob absorbs and redirects the catastrophic energy into his own body, resulting in a contained explosion that spares the city. In the aftermath, a humbled Toichiro admits his errors, apologizes to Shou, and surrenders to authorities. Television reports reveal that the redirected energy triggered the sudden and colossal growth of the broccoli seed Mob carried in his pocket, now known as the Divine Tree. Life gradually returns to normal for everyone involved, and Serizawa begins a new chapter as Reigen's trainee.

=== Season 3 (2022) ===
No. overall	No. in season	Title	Storyboarded by	Directed by	Written by	Original release date	Ref.
26	1	"Future ~Career Paths~"; Transliteration: "Shōrai ~Shinro Kibō~" (Japanese: 将来 ～進路希望～)	Takahiro Hasui	Takahiro Hasui	Hiroshi Seko	October 6, 2022	
Assigned to outline his future career, Mob struggles to decide on a path. Reigen suggests full-time employment at his agency, but Mob insists it remains only a part-time job. When a client brings a supposedly cursed idol—initially dismissed by Reigen as a fake—Mob and Serizawa detect genuine malice, leading Serizawa to perform the exorcism as Reigen claims it was a “test.” Mob grows increasingly anxious about his future, especially as classmates share their own clear plans. Mezato confronts him, revealing her awareness that he is responsible for the giant broccoli now called the “Divine Tree,” which is worshipped by the Psycho Helmet Cult, and again urges him to become their public leader. Later, Reigen, Mob, and Serizawa visit a client living in squalor who believes he is haunted; his stories of regret amplify the actual spirit's power, affecting Mob and Serizawa deeply until Reigen breaks their trance, enabling a successful exorcism. Mob comforts Serizawa about his progress but worries about his own stagnation. He ultimately submits a blank career form, contemplating becoming a traveler—a choice Reigen supports. Meanwhile, Dimple observes the city from atop the Divine Tree, preparing to initiate his own scheme.
27	2	"Yokai Hunter Amakusa Haruaki Appears! ~The Threat of a Hundred Demons!!~"; Transliteration: "Yōkai Hantā Amakusa Haruaki Tōjō! ~Hyakki no Kyōi!!~" (Japanese: 妖怪ハンター・天草晴明登場！ ～百鬼の脅威！！～)	Takahiro Hasui	Yōhei Shindō	Hiroshi Seko	October 13, 2022	
For Salt Middle School's Culture Festival, Mob is assigned to help create costumes for his class's haunted house. While his partners suggest simple ghost sheets, Mob desires a more creative approach but struggles to contribute ideas. As the festival approaches, his anxiety grows over their lack of progress. Meanwhile, Reigen is approached by the eccentric self-proclaimed Yokai Hunter, Haruaki Amakusa, who requests help tracking down a group of yokai called the “Hundred Demons” within the city. Skeptical yet tempted by a one million yen consultation fee, Reigen accepts and—accompanied by Serizawa and a distracted Mob—follows Amakusa to an abandoned building. Its basement is choked with mysterious roots, and they soon confirm the existence of real yokai, including the Yokai King and his four generals. While Amakusa fails in combat, Serizawa and Mob engage the yokai, with Mob simultaneously receiving inspired ideas for the haunted house throughout the battle. Afterward, Amakusa offers Mob and Serizawa positions as Yokai Hunters, which they decline, and Reigen's careless comments cost him the fee. Mob proposes basing their haunted house on the Yokai King—an idea his classmates reluctantly accept that ultimately becomes a festival highlight.
28	3	"Getting Carried Away ~100%~"; Transliteration: "Chōshininoru ~Hyaku Pāsento~" (Japanese: 調子に乗る ～100%～)	Tomomi Kamiya	Masamitsu Abe	Hiroshi Seko	October 20, 2022	
After a series of positive interactions—saving Tsubomi from embarrassment, receiving an invitation from Mezato to a Psycho Helmet Cult meeting, and making plans with Tome—Mob is teased by Emi about his recent “popularity.” Walking home with Ritsu, he notices more girls looking at him affectionately and begins to indulge in this newfound attention. That night, Mezato informs him the cult is holding auditions to select a leader, persuading Mob that participating will boost his popularity. Dimple appears and proposes a partnership to co-lead the cult, but Mob, suspicious of his motives, declines. After sharing his plans with Reigen, Mob receives a 5000 yen bonus to buy new clothes and consults Teru, ultimately purchasing an awkward shirt covered in monkeys. On audition day, Mob waits unsuccessfully for Tome and Mezato, who neither arrive nor answer his calls. Meanwhile, at the event, a being resembling Mob and calling itself “Psycho Helmet” appears, claims credit for the Divine Tree, and declares its intent to bring happiness to the world—demonstrating immense power by seizing control of the colossal plant.
29	4	"Divine Tree 1 ~The Founder Appears~"; Transliteration: "Shinju Ichi ~Kyōso Tōjō~" (Japanese: 神樹① ～教祖登場～)	Naoto Uchida	Naoto Uchida	Hiroshi Seko	October 27, 2022	
After learning from Mezato that the "true leader" has made his role unnecessary, Mob observes as students like Tome and the council begin promoting prayer to the Psycho Helmets and the Divine Tree. Teru is temporarily brainwashed by a cult cookie but breaks free, unsuccessfully confronting the powerful "Psycho Helmet"—revealed as Dimple—within the tree. Noticing the spreading roots, Reigen recruits Mob and Ritsu to destroy it, but Ritsu and eventually Reigen himself fall under the tree's influence after eating tainted sweets. Forced to proceed alone, Mob reaches the tree's entrance only to be hailed by a brainwashed crowd as the "original Psycho Helmet".
30	5	"Divine Tree 2 ~Peace~"; Transliteration: "Shinju Ni ~Pīsu~" (Japanese: 神樹② ～ピース～)	Katsuya Shigehara	Katsuya Shigehara	Hiroshi Seko	November 3, 2022	
Mob enters the Divine Tree and is confronted by the taunting voice of "Psycho Helmet", who questions if Mob enjoys the crowd's adoration while outlining his plan to achieve godhood by spreading the tree's influence worldwide. Mob discovers and recognizes the entity as Dimple, who again proposes a partnership. When Mob refuses, accusing him of manipulating hearts, he frees Teru for assistance, only to find Teru is also under control and forced to attack him. Mob blasts Teru out of the tree but soon faces diminished power due to drainage from Dimple and the tree itself, struggling against numerous clones. Dimple assumes a "God Dimple" form, ready for a final confrontation, but Mob asserts he is still holding back and denounces him as a "fake", enraging Dimple. As Mob's power steadily climbs to 99%, Dimple unleashes a devastating attack—only to be completely distracted and thrown off upon seeing the absurd monkey-print shirt Mob is wearing under his jacket, which he mockingly declares "lame".
31	6	"Divine Tree 3 ~Dimple Is~"; Transliteration: "Shinju San ~Ekubo wa~" (Japanese: 神樹③ ～エクボは～)	Yūta Kiso	Yūta Kiso	Hiroshi Seko	November 10, 2022	
After Dimple mocks his shirt, Mob reaches 100% but disperses his energy harmlessly, refusing to fight. He realizes Dimple still cares for him and apologizes for earlier dismissing his dreams. This sparks Dimple's own realization that godhood is lonely and meaningless without true friendship. He relinquishes his power, erases everyone's memories of the brainwashing, and helps Mob home. Suddenly, the sentient Divine Tree manifests as "Psycho Helmet" and attacks. Dimple fights back but is overpowered as it drains his energy. With his last strength, he ensures Mob and the others escape safely. Later, the Divine Tree is launched into space, and Mob, though unable to remember clearly, tearfully thanks Dimple for everything.
32	7	"Transmission 1 ~Winter Break~"; Transliteration: "Tsūshinchū Ichi ~Fuyuyasumi~" (Japanese: 通信中① ～冬休み～)	Shinnosuke Itō	Shinnosuke Itō	Yuzuru Tachikawa	November 17, 2022	
With graduation nearing, Tome disbands the Telepathy Club after accepting they never contacted aliens and that her members lacked genuine interest. To console her, Mameta, Haruto, and Saruta resolve to attempt contact on New Year's and enlist Mob's help. With assistance from twins Daichi and Kaito, they emit a psychic signal that unexpectedly attracts former member Takenaka, a true telepath who had left for that very reason. Persuaded to join their mission, the group asks Reigen to chaperone. On New Year's Eve, they all meet—including a reluctant Tome—and depart for the mountains just in time.
33	8	"Transmission 2 ~Encountering the Unknown~"; Transliteration: "Tsūshinchū Ni ~Michi to no Sōgū~" (Japanese: 通信中② ～未知との遭遇～)	Hakuyu Go	Hakuyu Go	Yuzuru Tachikawa	November 24, 2022	
During their trip up Mt. Mudboat, the group encounters numerous setbacks: Mob suffers from carsickness, Reigen takes a wrong turn, and Tome remains skeptical of Takenaka's telepathic abilities. After Mob and Saruta leave to use the bathroom, the rest of the group ventures out to find them and all become lost, deciding to trek up the mountain on foot. Tome refuses to continue, especially upon realizing they left the alien summoning ritual book in the car, but Mob persuades her to press on. At the summit, Takenaka performs the ritual from memory, later admitting the book's author was a fraud. Touched by everyone's effort, Tome agrees to keep trying—and to their astonishment, an alien ship appears, beaming them aboard. They spend New Year's Eve interacting with the extraterrestrials and playing Earth games before returning home. Mameta is accidentally left behind and treated as royalty on the alien homeworld until he eventually convinces them to return him, soon forgetting the entire experience.
34	9	"Mob 1 ~Moving~"; Transliteration: "Mobu Ichi ~Hikkoshi~" (Japanese: モブ① ～引っ越し～)	Tōko Yatabe	Yōhei Shindō	Hiroshi Seko	December 1, 2022	
Mob is devastated to learn Tsubomi will be moving soon but resolves to confess his feelings before she leaves. After witnessing numerous classmates confess and be rejected, Mob struggles to articulate why he likes her when questioned by Mezato. Following advice from Reigen and Serizawa, he resolves to honor his emotions despite not fully understanding them. He calls Tsubomi and arranges to meet at a park after school. On Teru's suggestion, he buys flowers—receiving an upgraded bouquet from Minegishi as thanks. While waiting at a crosswalk, Mob uses his powers to stop a car from hitting a cat, then physically shoves a distracted child out of the path of an oncoming truck, taking the impact himself.
35	10	"Mob 2 ~Rival~"; Transliteration: "Mobu Ni ~Raibaru~" (Japanese: モブ② ～ライバル～)	Naoto Uchida, Takahiro Hasui, Yuzuru Tachikawa	Shinnosuke Itō, Naoto Uchida	Hiroshi Seko	December 8, 2022	
After being hit by the truck, Mob awakens in his ???% state and rampages toward the park, bouquet in hand, destroying everything in his path and forcing a city-wide lockdown. Teru confronts him but is overpowered and thrown into a populated area, forcing him to split his efforts between fighting and protecting civilians. From within, Mob begs for someone to stop his rampaging self. After defeating Teru and leveling the area, ???% Mob continues toward a convenience store run by former Claw members, who prepare to defend it. Meanwhile, a team of psychic convicts is deployed to handle the threat, with Toichiro Suzuki arriving alone to intervene.
36	11	"Mob 3 ~Trauma~"; Transliteration: "Mobu San ~Torauma~" (Japanese: モブ③ ～トラウマ～)	Katsuya Shigehara, Yūta Kiso	Katsuya Shigehara	Hiroshi Seko	December 15, 2022	
Ritsu senses the disturbance and rushes to find Mob, recognizing his brother's dangerous ???% state has reemerged. After easily overwhelming the former Claw members, "Mob" is confronted by Toichiro, who is quickly overpowered until Shou arrives to assist. Their combined efforts briefly hold him back when the real Mob internally resists, creating an opening Toichiro attempts to use to seal Mob's powers—even at the cost of his own life. However, choosing family over sacrifice, he withdraws with Shou. The Body Improvement Club attempts to intervene next but are swiftly defeated and saved by Ritsu. Realizing Mob's rampage stems from suppressed emotions, Ritsu declares he will always listen without fear, reaching 100% power himself. Though now able to combat "Mob", he remains outmatched as a giant tornado forms around them. Inside his mind, Mob confronts his darker self, which claims to be the "true Shigeo Kageyama" and vows to consume the facade Mob presents to the world. Outside, Reigen and Serizawa race toward the tornado.
37	12	"Confession ~The Future~"; Transliteration: "Kokuhaku ~Kore kara~" (Japanese: 告白 ～これから～)	Takahiro Hasui	Takahiro Hasui	Hiroshi Seko	December 22, 2022	
Reigen pushes through the storm alone after Serizawa is drained, confronting Mob's rampaging ???% state. Dimple possesses him just in time, allowing Reigen to confess his lack of powers and persuade Mob to accept all parts of himself. This integration forms "100% Shigeo Kageyama", who then meets Tsubomi at the park only to be gently rejected. Months later, Mob serves as vice-captain of the Body Improvement Club and visits Spirits & Such, where Tome now works and teases him about his continued friendship with Tsubomi. At Reigen's birthday celebration, he falls into the cake, making Mob and everyone laugh.

== OVAs ==
No.	Title	Storyboarded by (Note: Information is taken from the ending credits of the OVA.)	Directed by	Written by	Original release date	Ref.
1	"Mob Psycho 100: Reigen ~The Miraculous Unknown Psychic~"; Transliteration: "Mob Psycho 100: REIGEN ~Shirarezaru Kiseki no Reinōryokusha~" (Japanese: モブサイコ100 REIGEN ~知られざる奇跡の霊能力者~)	Yuzuru Tachikawa	Katsuya Shigehara, Yūji Ōya	Hiroshi Seko	March 18, 2018	
Inspired by a television interview, Reigen decides to write a book glorifying his own accomplishments, tasking Mob with transcribing heavily embellished versions of past events where Reigen inserts himself as the hero. Mob questions the accuracy, but Reigen dismisses his concerns as necessary dramatization. When Mob’s friends edit the manuscript, they are appalled by its dishonesty and rewrite it to focus entirely on Mob’s actual deeds, reducing Reigen to a minor role. Upon receiving the printed copy, Reigen is horrified to find his fabricated achievements erased. His crowdfunding campaign raises only 2500 yen—all his own contribution—which he uses to take Mob out for ramen.
2	"Mob Psycho 100: The Spirits and Such Consultation Office's First Company Outing ~A Healing Trip that Warms the Heart~"; Transliteration: "Mob Psycho 100: Dai'ikkai Rei Toka Sōdansho Ian'ryokō ~Kokoro Mitasu Iyashi no Tabi~" (Japanese: モブサイコ100 第一回霊とか相談所慰安旅行~ココロ満たす癒やしの旅~)	Yūji Ōya	Yūji Ōya	Hiroshi Seko	September 25, 2019	
Reigen accepts a job at a poorly-reviewed hot springs resort, blaming visitor complaints on travel through "another dimension". He brings Mob, Ritsu, Dimple, and Serizawa, intending to combine work with a vacation. On the train, Reigen and Serizawa fall asleep in a tunnel and awaken in a parallel dimension, while the others arrive normally at the springs and meet Teru, dragging the sleeping duo with them. The resort head explains the legendary spirit Ihoben guards this dimensional gateway. Reigen remains trapped in a train time-loop for what feels like days until Serizawa—who can move freely between dimensions—fetches Mob and the group. They identify and clear a spiritual clog in Ihoben, resolving the distortion, which Dimple traces to a cold caught by one of the resort owners, Ihoben’s descendants. After solving the mystery, they depart, but as Reigen dozes off again in the tunnel, another elder at the springs falls ill, hinting at recurring trouble.
