= Gatting =

Gatting may refer to three related English sportsmen, or to a Danish sports woman:

- Joe Gatting (born 1987), Brighton footballer
- Mike Gatting (born 1957), former Middlesex and England cricketer
- Steve Gatting (born 1959), former Arsenal, Brighton and Charlton footballer

Steve and Mike are brothers while Joe is the son of Steve.

- Michelle Gatting (born 1993), Danish racing driver
