= Eastshade =

2019 video game

- Developer: Eastshade Studios
- Publisher: Eastshade Studios
- Designer: Daniel Weinbaum
- Series: Eastshade
- Engine: Unity
- Platforms: Windows, PlayStation 4, Xbox One
- Release: February 13, 2019: Windows; February 13, 2019; PS4, Xbox One; October 21, 2019
- Genres: Adventure, photography
- Mode: Single-player

Eastshade is a 2019 adventure photography game developed and published by Eastshade Studios as a sequel to 2017's Leaving Lyndow. Set in an open world populated by anthropomorphic animals and played from a first person perspective, Eastshade follows a painter who traverses across the island realm of Eastshade in order to complete paintings of four distinct locations to fulfill the last wishes of the character's mother. It was initially released for Windows on February 13, 2019, while console ports for the PlayStation 4 and Xbox One were released on October 21, 2019. Eastshade received a generally positive reception from critics.

== Gameplay ==
Eastshade has no combat mechanics. Its gameplay involves completing quests given by various non-player characters and fulfilling various objectives. In most instances, quests in Eastshade involve doing good deeds, helping people see the error of their ways, and bringing communities together through the player character's artistry. The compositional mechanics for the player's paintings resemble the framing involved in taking a picture rather than painting one.

== Development and release ==
Eastshade Studios developed and released Leaving Lyndow prior to their work on Eastshade. Besides serving as an introduction to the in-game universe of Eastshade, the developers wanted to develop working experience on shipping a smaller project before attempting a more large-scale project, and that the sales revenue from Leaving Lyndow was intended to supplement the funding of Eastshade. Eastshade was released for Microsoft Windows on 13 February 2019 and on Xbox One and PlayStation 4 consoles on 21 October 2019. The game was available as part of the Xbox Game Pass service from November 2020 until October 2021.

== Reception ==
Reception

Aggregate score
Aggregator	Score
Metacritic	78/100

Review scores
Publication	Score
Adventure Gamers	5/5
Edge	6/10
GameSpot	9/10
Jeuxvideo.com	6/10
PC Gamer (US)	7.8

The PC version of Eastshade received "generally favorable" reviews according to review aggregator Metacritic. Becky Waxman from Adventure Gamers gave Eastshade a perfect score and called it a "polished, immersive trek through a world so alluring it's a shame it doesn't actually exist". David Wildgoose from GameSpot thought of Eastshade as a rare first-person open world game that does not involve killing other characters, and lauded it a "breath of fresh Eastshadian air and a genuine, unironic feel-good game". Philippa Warr from PC Gamer summarized Eastshade as a "charming traveling artist adventure that makes screenshotting an intrinsic part of play" as the game uses image capture mechanics in interesting ways.

A few publications have given Eastshade less positive reviews, with criticism focusing on its unbalanced gameplay mechanics and technical issues.
