= List of Case Closed volumes (1–20) =

Cover of Case Closed volume 1

The Case Closed manga, known in Japan as Detective Conan (名探偵コナン, Meitantei Conan), is written by Gosho Aoyama and serialized in Shogakukan's shōnen manga magazine Weekly Shōnen Sunday since January 19, 1994. Since Case Closed's premiere, over 1,000 chapters have been released in Japan, making it the 25th longest running manga series. Several adaptations based on Case Closed have been made, including an anime series and animated films. A database consisting of all the cases from the manga was launched in 2007. Viz Media announced its licensing of the series on June 1, 2004, and following Funimation Entertainment's English localization, released the series under the name Case Closed with renamed characters. The series follows high school detective Jimmy Kudo who was transformed into a child after being forced to swallow a poison.

The tankōbon volumes 1–20 contain chapters 1–200. Shogakukan released all twenty volumes between June 18, 1994, and July 18, 1998. Viz Media licensed and released the first twenty volumes between September 7, 2004, and July 21, 2009.

== Volumes ==
No.	Title	Original release date	English release date
1	The Sherlock Holmes of Modern Times	June 18, 1994; 978-4-09-123371-4	September 7, 2004; 978-1-59116-327-5
1. "A Modern-Day Sherlock Holmes" (平成のホームズ, Heisei no Hōmuzu); 2. "The Great Detective Turned Small" (小さくなった名探偵, Chiisaku Natta Meitantei); 3. "The Unwelcome Great Detective" (仲間はずれの名探偵, Nakama Hazure no Meitantei); 4. "The Sixth Smokestack" (6本目の煙突, Ropponme no Entotsu); 5. "The Other Perpetrator" (もう一人の犯人, Mō Hitori no Han'nin); 6. "From Third-Rate to Great Detective" (迷探偵を名探偵に, Meitantei o Meitantei ni); 7. "The Bloody Case of the Lovely Pop Idol" (血ぬられたアイドル, Chi Nurareta Aidoru); 8. "Resemblance" (あなたに似た人, Anata ni Nita Hito); 9. "An Unfortunate Misunderstanding" (不幸な誤解, Fukō na Gōkai)
High school detective Jimmy Kudo goes to an amusement park with his friend, Rachel Moore, and solves a murder that occurs on a roller coaster. Shortly afterwards he tails two men in black and discovers them performing an illegal trade. Kudo is then attacked by them and is force-fed an experimental poison and left to die. A rare side-effect of the poison, however, transforms Kudo's body into that of a child instead of killing him. Adopting the pseudonym Conan Edogawa, Kudo hides his identity to investigate the two men in black and stays with Rachel and her incompetent private investigator father, Richard Moore. Richard is hired to investigate the kidnapping of a president's daughter. Conan locates her using one of the family dogs and saves her. Pop Idol Yoko Okino is suspected of murder when her stalker is found with a knife in his back. Conan knocks Richard unconscious and uses his voice-changing bowtie to solve the case while posing as Richard, revealing it to be a suicide.
2	The Woman of Mystery	July 18, 1994; 978-4-09-123372-1	November 3, 2004; 978-1-59116-587-3
10. "A Lucrative Tailing Job" (割のいい尾行, Wari no Ii Bikō); 11. "The Perfect Alibi" (完璧なアリバイ, Kanpeki na Aribai); 12. "The Photo Speaks" (写真は語る, Shashin wa Kataru); 13. "The Missing Man" (行方不明の男, Yukue Fumei no Otoko); 14. "The Poor Girl" (かわいそうな少女, Kawaisō na Shōjo); 15. "Follow the Big Man!" (大男を追え!, Ō Otoko o Oe!); 16. "A Devilish Woman" (悪魔のような女, Akuma no Yō na Onna); 17. "Mansion of Horror" (恐怖の館, Kyōfu no Yakata); 18. "Disappearing Children" (消える子供達, Kieru Kodomo-tachi); 19. "Nightmare in the Basement" (地下室の悪夢, Chikashitsu no Akumu)
Conan is enrolled into Teitan Elementary and, after class, notices Richard shadowing a man in an overcoat. Richard reveals he was hired to follow the man for three days and is to be paid handsomely at the end. On the fourth day, the man is dead, with Richard certain his employer is the murderer, though he has a solid alibi. Conan discovers the employer was posing as the dead man in the overcoat on the third day, as the man had already been killed. After Conan leaves incriminating evidence, the police apprehend the employer. Richard is hired by a young woman to search for her father. They find him but on the very next day they discover him dead and his daughter missing. Conan's investigation leads him to discover that the father and daughter were involved in a bank robbery for the two men in black. Conan's school friends, Amy Yoshida, George Kojima, and Mitch Tsuburaya, ask him to accompany them as they explore a haunted house where a murder occurred five years prior. As they explore the house, Conan discovers the victim was murdered by his son and the supposed haunting was the son and his mother hiding from the authorities. Conan convinces them to turn themselves in and they comply.
3	One and the Same?	October 18, 1994; 978-4-09-123373-8	January 4, 2005; 978-1-59116-589-7
20. "The Hatamoto Family" (籏本家の一族, Hatamoto-ke no Ichizoku); 21. "The Secret of the Locked Room" (密室の秘密, Misshitsu no Himitsu); 22. "Who Gets the Fortune?" (遺産の行方, Isan no Yukue); 23. "Family Massacre" (一族抹殺, Ichizoku Massatsu); 24. "Who Rigged the Darkness?" (暗闇の仕掛人, Kurayami no Shikakenin); 25. "Unattainable Dream" (かなわぬ夢, Kanawanu Yume); 26. "A Strange Gift" (奇妙な贈り物, Kimyō na Okurimono); 27. "The Same Person" (同一人物, Dōitsujinbutsu); 28. "The Mystery of August 3rd" (8月3日の謎, Hachi-gatsu Mikka no Nazo); 29. "The Nick of Time" (眼前セーフ, Ganzen Sēfu)
Conan, Rachel, and Richard are given a ride on the Hatamoto family cruise ship after missing their return boat. During their cruise the head of the Hatamoto family is murdered and the fiancé of the victim's grand-daughter is the prime suspect. The fiancé's father killed himself when the Hatamoto family took over their company and this is cited as the murder motive. Conan's investigates and uses his tranquilizer watch and voice-changing bowtie to impersonate Richard. He declares the fiancé's innocence and declares the grand-daughter's cousin as the murderer, citing unrequited love as the motive. Richard is hired by a surgeon who has been receiving monthly toys and money. His job is to identify the sender and Conan investigates, while at the same time, Rachel suspects him to actually be Jimmy. Conan identifies the sender to be the father of one of the surgeon's patient who died during surgery and who plans to murder the surgeon's son. After stopping the murder, Conan has Hiroshi Agasa call Rachel using Jimmy's voice, settling her suspicions.
4	Explosives On A Train	February 18, 1995; 978-4-09-123374-5	March 1, 2005; 978-1-59116-632-0
30. "The Armored Knight" (甲冑の騎士, Katchū no Kishi); 31. "Death Note" (ダイイング・メッセージ, Daiingu Messēji"; lit. Dying Message); 32. "Out of Ink" (書けないペン, Kakukenai Pen); 33. "The Men in Black" (はちあわせた二人組, Hachiawaseta Futarigumi); 34. "Four People in First Class" (グリーン車の四人, Gurīn-sha no Yonin); 35. "Ten Seconds of Terror" (ラスト10秒の恐怖, Rasuto Jū Byō no Kyōfu); 36. "Get the Code!!" (暗号表入手!!, Angō Hyō Nyūshu!!); 37. "The ABC's of Code Cracking" (暗号解読のABC, Angō Kaidoku no ABC); 38. "The Answer and Another Answer" (答えもうひとつの答, Kotae to mō Hitotsu no Kotae); 39. "The Glowing Fish" (光る魚の正体, Hikaru Sakana no Shōtai"; lit. The Glowing Fish's True Form)
Conan, Richard, and Rachel go to a museum where the owner is murdered by a suit of armor. Conan determines the museum director is the murderer and has Richard expose it. On the train Conan runs into the two men in black, who refer to each other as Gin and Vodka. He overhears that they have planted a bomb on the train. After the two get off the train, Conan tracks down the bomb before it detonates and removes it from the train. Conan and his friends find a paper coded with symbols after mistakenly switching bags with a man. Conan realizes the message refers to neon lights and follows the code to where they find a treasure of gold coins. An Italian gang who stole the gold coins attempts to steal back their goods but is apprehended by Conan. Afterwards, Amy becomes infatuated with Conan and kisses him on the cheek.
5	The Bandaged Be-header	April 18, 1995; 978-4-09-123375-2	May 5, 2005; 978-1-59116-633-7
40. "The Man in Bandages" (怪人...包帯の男, Kaijin... Hōtai no Otoko); 41. "The First Victim!" (第一の犠牲者!, Daiichi no Giseisha!); 42. "Rachel!" (蘭ピンチ!, Ran Pinchi!"; lit. Ran's in Trouble!); 43. "Assault in the Dark!" (暗闇の襲撃!, Kurayami no Shūgeki!); 44. "The Killer's Identity!" (殺人鬼の正体!, Satsujinki no Shōtai!); 45. "Karaoke Murder!" (カラオケ殺人!, Karaoke Satsujin!); 46. "Murder or Suicide?" (自殺か他殺か?, Jisatsu ka Tasatsu ka?); 47. "Hidden Meanings" (歌に秘められた謎, Uta ni Himerareta Nazo); 48. "A Tragic Misunderstanding..." (すれちがい..., Surechigai...); 49. "A Strange Visitor" (見知らぬ来訪者。, Mishiranu Raihōsha.); 50. "Escape and Pursuit" (脱出そして追跡。, Dasshutsu Soshite Tsuiseki.)
Rachel's friend, Serena Sebastian, invites her to attend a film club's reunion party at a villa. Conan and Rachel meet a mysterious man covered in bandages on their way. The bandaged man starts to kill members of the film club one by one as the night goes on. Conan tranquilizes Serena and impersonates her to expose the murderer, the fat member of the film club who was only pretending to be obese. Serena invites Rachel to meet the members of a band at a karaoke parlor. The lead singer dies after singing his favorite song. Conan solves the case by using the bow-tie set to his original voice and reveals the manager to be the murderer. Afterwards, Rachel waits outside Jimmy's house for him. Conan manages to give her a Christmas present while posing as Jimmy and keeps his identity a secret. Later a woman posing as Conan's mother kidnaps him, after revealing she knows his true identity. Conan escapes and begins investigating her and her companion, a mysterious masked man.
6	The Last Loan	July 18, 1995; 978-4-09-123376-9	July 5, 2005; 978-1-59116-838-6
51. "The Truth Under the Mask" (仮面の下の真実, Kamen no Shita no Shinjitsu); 52. "Three Visitors?" (三人の訪問客?, San'nin no Hōmonkyaku?); 53. "Three Men Without Alibis" (三人のアリバイ, San'nin no Aribai); 54. "The Mystery of the Answering Machine" (留守番電話の謎, Rusuban Denwa no Nazo); 55. "The Testimony of the Tansu Chest" (タンスの言葉, Tansu no Kotoba); 56. "The Junior Detective League!" (結成!少年探偵団, Kessei! Shōnen Tantei-dan); 57. "Mysterious Brothers" (ナゾの兄弟, Nazo no Kyōdai); 58. "The Mystery of the Moving Body" (動く死体の謎, Ugoku Shitai no Nazo); 59. "Night of the Festival" (祭りの夜, Matsuri no Yoru); 60. "The Perfect Alibi!?" (アリバイは完璧!?, Aribai wa Kanpeki!?)
Conan discovers the woman and masked man to be his parents, Booker Kudo and Vivian Kudo, who were told of his situation by Agasa. They offer to take him to America with them but Conan refuses, as he wants to be with Rachel. Richard is hired to investigate the affair of the wife of an antique collector. The collector is murdered and his last three visitors are the suspects. Conan tranquilizes Richard and reveals that the visitor they met in Iaidō is the murderer. Later, Conan and his friends form a detective group called The Junior Detective League. They take on a request to find a lost cat, they discover that the cat had invaded a home where they discover a man drowned in his bathtub. When the police arrive, the dead man answers the door and the crime scene has been cleaned. Conan reveals the man is the murderer and had been impersonating his twin brother whom he killed. Conan, Richard, and Rachel attend a festival when they become involved with a man who is a prime suspect to murdering his roommate. Conan suspects the man to be the murderer but he has an alibi supported by pictures.
7	The Curse of the Moonlight Sonata	November 18, 1995; 978-4-09-123377-6	September 8, 2005; 978-1-59116-978-9
61. "Caught on Film" (写真のワナ, Shashin no Wana"; lit. The Photograph's Trap); 62. "Invitation to Moon Shadow Island" (月影島への招待状, Tsukikage-jima e no Shōtaijō); 63. "The Curse of the Piano" (ピアノの呪い, Piano no Noroi); 64. "The Musical Score" (残された楽譜, Nokosareta Gakufu); 65. "The Secret of the Hellfire" (業火の秘密, Gōka no Himitsu); 66. "The Blood-Stained Button" (血染めのボタン, Chizome no Botan); 67. "The Secret Behind a Name!!" (名前の秘密!!, Namae no Himitsu!!); 68. "Jimmy's Girlfriend!!" (新一の恋人!!, Shinichi no Koibito!!"; lit. Shin'ichi's Girlfriend!!); 69. "The Great Detective Rachel!" (名探偵蘭!?, Meitantei Ran!?"; lit. The Great Detective Ran?!); 70. "Running Out of Time!?" (命の時間切れ!?, Inochi no Taimu Rimitto!?)
Conan tranquilizes Richard and reveals that the photos which prove the murderer's alibi were taken from last year. The next day Richard receives a letter requesting him to investigate something at Tsukikage Island. While asking the residents of the island about the identity of the sender, they discover the name matches a famous pianist who died many years prior. A string of murders relating to the deceased pianist begins and Conan investigates. He determines the killer to be the doctor, who is the son of the deceased pianist. The doctor stays in a burning building and kills himself, mirroring the way his father died. A girl visits the Moore agency, requesting them to search for her boyfriend Jimmy. Conan tells her Jimmy will meet her at her house if she takes Rachel and Conan with her. As he investigates, Conan realizes the girl wants Jimmy to investigate a kidnapping case involving the brother of a star Tokyo soccer player. The kidnapper demands the girl tells her boyfriend to throw his match or lose his brother. Conan realizes the kidnapper is the teammate of the star player and proceeds to locate him.
8	Who Is the Night Baron?	December 9, 1995; 978-4-09-123378-3	November 15, 2005; 978-1-4215-0111-6
71. "Found at Last!!" (ついに見つけた!!, Tsui ni Mitsuketa!!); 72. "The Night Baron" (闇の男爵, Naito Baron); 73. "The Virus of Terror" (恐怖のウイルス, Kyōfu no Uirusu); 74. "Under the Mask" (仮面の下, Kamen no Shita); 75. "Rachel's Tears" (蘭の涙, Ran no Namida); 76. "The Wind's Mischief?!" (風のいたずら!?, Kaze no Itazura!?); 77. "The Secret of the Landing Spot" (落下地点の秘密, Rakka chiten no Himitsu); 78. "The Bride's Tragedy" (花嫁の悲劇, Hanayome no Higeki); 79. "Forbidden Lemon Tree?!" (禁断のレモンティー!?, Kindan no Remon Tī!?); 80. "A Reason to Kill" (殺しの理由, Koroshi no Riyū)
Conan and Rachel rescue the kidnapped boy. Rachel's misunderstanding of Jimmy's relationship with the girl is fixed. Agasa enters Conan (along with Richard and Rachel) into a contest where the winner is to receive free accommodations at a luxury hotel, and a floppy disk of a reputed computer virus. The winner must correctly identify which of the participants is a character called the Night Baron, which is also the name of the virus program. However, when one of the participants is dropped from the hotel room in the Night Baron costume, and the costume is mysteriously taken afterwards, Conan must rush to find the killer. Rachel and Serena (and Conan) attend the wedding of their middle school music teacher. But when she is poisoned from her lemon tea drink, Conan determines possible culprits.
9	Kidnappings, Shootings, & Drownings... Oh My!	January 18, 1996; 978-4-09-123379-0	January 17, 2006; 978-1-4215-0166-6
81. "A Dangerous Game of Hide and Seek" (危ないかくれんぼ, Abunai Kakurenbo); 82. "Follow That Voice!!" (声を追え!!, Koe o Oe!!); 83. "What! Really!?" (えっ!本当!?, Ē! Hontō!?); 84. "Richard's Reunion" (小五郎の同窓会, Kogorō no Dōsō-kai"; lit. Kogoro's Class Reunion); 85. "An Unexpected Hint" (意外なヒント, Igai na Hinto); 86. "Standing Benkei" (弁慶の仁王立ち, Benkei no Niōdachi"; lit. The Two Benkei Standing Deaths); 87. "Groom Selection" (花婿選び, Hanamuko Erabi); 88. "The Creeping Shadow" (忍び寄る影, Shinobi yoru Kage); 89. "Another Dead Body" (死体がもうひとつ..., Shitai ga mō Hitotsu...); 90. "Indiscriminate Killings!?" (無差別殺人!?, Musabetsu Satsujin!?)
Conan plays hide-and-seek with his friends when Amy falls asleep in a trunk of a car, where she finds a severed head. Worried that she might have been kidnapped by serial killers, Conan and friends use the Junior Detective League badge to track her down with his solar-powered skateboard. Richard has a class reunion with his Judo club. When the manager of the club is murdered, Conan investigates, but after observing that Richard has a personal stake in the case, he drops hints that allow Richard to solve it. Later, Richard is invited over by a company owner whose daughter is being showcased for possible suitors. The car tires of the guests are slashed, leaving them stranded at the mansion. But when some of the guests are murdered and Rachel almost becomes one of the victims, Conan and Richard begin investigating.
10	East Meets West	April 18, 1996; 978-4-09-123380-6	March 21, 2006; 978-1-4215-0316-5
91. "The Timed Water Trick" (水の時間差トリック, Mizu no Jikan-sa Torikku); 92. "Great Detective of the West" (西の名探偵, Nishi no Meitantei); 93. "Two Theories" (二人の推理, Daburu no Suiri); 94. "Great Detective of the East...!?" (東の名探偵...!?, Higashi no Meitantei...!?); 95. "Great Detective of the East Appears!?" (東の名探偵現る!?, Higashi no Meitantei Arawaru!?); 96. "A Hot Body" (熱いからだ, Atsui Karada); 97. "The Killer Creeps Up" (忍び寄る殺人鬼, Shinobi Yoru Satsujinki); 98. "The Other Passenger" (もう一人の乗客, Mō Hitotsu no Jōkyaku); 99. "Tragedy in the Blizzard" (吹雪が呼んだ惨劇, Fubuki ga Yonda Sangeki); 100. "The Last Word" (最後の言葉, Saigo no Kotoba)
Conan figures out the murderer's identity. High-school detective Harley Hartwell arrives in Tokyo to search for Jimmy, in order to test his powers of deduction. Harley accompanies Richard as he investigates the murder of a diplomat. Harley reveals his deductions but is corrected by Jimmy, who has returned to his normal form after drinking the Chinese alcohol paikaru. After correcting Harley's deductions, Jimmy reverts to Conan without revealing his identity. Conan plans to drink more of the alcohol to become Jimmy again, and opts to play with the Junior Detective League one final time. At the library they overhear one of the staff is missing and stay overnight to investigate. They discover the library director has been smuggling drugs in the books and murdering the staff when he was caught. After apprehending the director, Conan returns home and drinks the alcohol only to find it ineffective. Conan wins a ski trip and is accompanied by Richard and Rachel. When they lose their keys, they are invited to stay at a university professor's chalet. The professor is fatally stabbed, but leaves a message for Richard to decipher before dying.
11	An Unfamiliar Face	July 18, 1996; 978-4-09-125041-4	May 16, 2006; 978-1-4215-0441-4
101. "The Talking Tablecloth" (話すテーブルクロス, Hanasu Tēburu Kurosu); 102. "Death During Live Broadcast" (生放送中の死, Namahōsō-chū no Shi); 103. "The Secret Path" (幻の道, Maboroshi no Michi"; lit. Illusionary Road); 104. "Emergency Detective Show" (緊急推理ショー, Kinkyū Suiri Shō); 105. "An Important Person?" (大事な人!?, Daiji na Hito!?); 106. "Location of the Weapon" (凶器のありか, Kyōki no Arika); 107. "Two Mysteries" (二つの謎, Futatsu no Nazo); 108. "Training Room" (修行の間, Shugyō no Ma); 109. "Cherry Blossoms and the Hole in the Wall" (桜と壁の穴, Sakura to Kabe no Ana); 110. "The Power to Float in Air" (宙に浮く力, Chū ni Uku Chikara)
Conan realizes the message refers to shogi and reveals the culprit. Richard is hired to speak about the privacy of cellphones on live TV. Meanwhile, the TV anchor man murders his producer. After investigating, Conan tranquilizes Richard and reveals his deductions on live TV. Rachel sneaks out of the Moore agency to meet someone and Conan follows out of jealousy. He follows her to a cafe where a murder occurs. Conan is able to reveal the murderer to be a man with a bandaged finger due to Eva Kadan, who is revealed to be Rachel's mother and the person Rachel planned on meeting. Later, Richard's car breaks down on a mountain and they are forced to seek shelter at a nearby temple. That night the head monk is murdered in the same fashion a monk was two years prior. Conan impersonates Richard to reveal the murder was done by sealing a room and filling it up with water and reveals the identity of the murderer.
12	Who Shanked Teddy?	September 18, 1996; 978-4-09-125042-1	July 18, 2006; 978-1-4215-0442-1
111. "Doctor Agasa's Treasure Chest" (博士の宝箱, Hakase no Takarabako); 112. "The Black Sun" (黒い太陽, Kuroi Taiyō); 113. "The Nature of the Treasure" (宝の正体, Takara no Shōtai); 114. "An Unexpected Encounter" (突然の遭遇, Totsuzen no Sōgū); 115. "Where Were the Explosives?" (爆弾の行方, Bakudan no Yukue); 116. "Conan's Miscalculation" (コナンの誤算, Konan no Gosan); 117. "Gathering at Mycroft" (マイクロフトでの集い, Maikurofuto de no Tsudoi); 118. "The Woman Who Knew Too Much" (知りすぎていた女, Shirisugiteita Onna); 119. "A Mysterious Explosion" (ナゾの爆発, Nazo no Bakuhatsu); 120. "A Lie Revealed" (見破られたウソ, Miyaburareta Uso)
Agasa organizes a treasure hunt for the Junior Detective League at a house his great-uncle has passed down to him. They find the treasure box full of destroyed toys and realize someone was searching the abandoned house. Following some symbols engraved in the house, Conan reveals a secret attic where they find a deceased man who had been hiding from a criminal that had forced him to create lithography money-printing plates. The criminal appears out of hiding and is apprehended by Conan. Richard is at a game company as the designers plan to add him for a cameo appearance. There, Conan runs into a man codenamed Tequila who has ties to Gin and Vodka. Tequila is killed when a bomb meant for someone else is detonated, forcing Conan to investigate and deduce which game designer planned the bomb as well as who Tequila traded briefcases with. After doing so, and having the police apprehend the target, Conan questions the culprit who reveals the whereabouts of Gin and Vodka. As Conan proceeds to the meeting location he discovers that Gin and Vodka detonated a bomb as they leave, hiding any traces they may have left. Conan enters a contest to win the first edition of a Sherlock Holmes book and runs into Harley. A string of murder begins and Conan and Harley begin to investigate.
13	Life's A Beach... Then You Get Murdered!	December 10, 1996; 978-4-09-125043-8	September 19, 2006; 978-1-4215-0443-8
121. "Real Self" (本当の姿, Hontō no Sugata); 122. "Who Was It They Witnessed?" (目撃者は...!?, Mokugekisha wa...!?); 123. "Triplets Under Suspicion" (三つ子の容疑者, Mitsugo no Yōgisha); 124. "A Lack of Brotherly Love" (哀しき兄弟の絆, Kanashiki Kyōdai no Kizuna); 125. "The Falling Corpse" (落ちる死体, Ochiru Shitai); 126. "A Suspicious Suicide" (疑惑の自殺, Giwaku no Jisatsu); 127. "The Flower and the Butterfly" (花と蝶, Hana to Chō); 128. "The Vanishing Criminal" (逃亡者, Tōbōsha); 129. "Gomera's Tragedy" (怪獣ゴメラの悲劇, Kaijū Gomera no Higeki); 130. "A Glimpse from Behind" (去りゆく後ろ姿, Sari Yuku Ushiro Sugata)
Conan and Harley reveal the club president to be the murderer. In the end, Harley has figured out that Conan is actually the shrunken Kudo. Later, Serena's sister invites Rachel and Conan to the beach. Serena's sister's fiancé becomes the prime suspect to murdering his own father but Conan realizes the fiancé's twin brothers could also be the culprit. Conan proves one of the twins is the murderer by relaying a message on the answering machine. Richard is hired to have an interview with a painter. Before the meeting, the painter kills his mistress, feigns it as suicide, and has Richard be his witness. Conan investigates the murder method, revealing that a system of strings tied to the door was holding the body up. Later, The Junior Detective League are invited to the studio where the fictional Gomera series is filmed. A murder occurs and the producer who intends to cancel the series is killed. Conan reveals the cast and crew have been covering for the murderer who is Gomera's actor.
14	The Magical Suicide	March 18, 1997; 978-4-09-123371-4	November 21, 2006; 978-1-4215-0444-5
131. "That Old Photo!!" (写真があった!!, Shashin ga Atta!!); 132. "Numbers on the Phone" (電話の数字, Denwa no Sūji); 133. "The Case Has Only Just Begun!" (事件はこれから!?, Jiken wa Kore Kara!?); 134. "Interrogation Amidst Falling Leaves" (落葉の中の尋問, Rakuyō no Naka no Jinmon); 135. "In Mom's Chest!?" (母さんの胸の中!?, Kaa-san no Mune no Naka!?); 136. "Conan's Smile" (コナンの笑み..., Konan no Emi...); 137. "Vivian's Smile" (有希子の笑み..., Yukiko no Emi...); 138. "The Mystery Man" (もう一人の..., Mō Hitori no..."; lit. One More Person...); 139. "A Strange Gathering" (奇妙な集まり, Kimyō no Atsumari); 140. "The Last Guest" (最後の客, Saigo no Kyaku)
A magician is killed in the basement of his home and it is presumed to be suicide. Richard is hired to investigate while, during the investigation, Rachel suspects Conan to be Jimmy again. After Conan solves the magician's dying message which indicates the killer to be one of the magicians disciples, the daughter of the man the magician murdered. After solving the case, Rachel confronts Conan about his true identity. Kudo's mother, Vivian, returns home and tricks Rachel into believing Conan is a distant relative. Vivian takes Conan to investigate an inheritance issue in a rich family. The family suspect their uncle is a fraud and is seeking the inheritance. During the investigation, one of the family members is murdered. Conan reveals the murder was actually self defense and reveals the identities of the two who planned to kill the uncle. Kudo's father, Booker, arrives and corrects Conan, revealing the uncle is a fraud and the Brazilian bodyguard is the real inheritor. Later, Serena, Rachel, and Conan are invited to stay with their elementary teacher at a snow-covered cottage. The teacher reveals that her friends all received anonymous invitations to the cottage. Soon after, Serena is attacked and one of the teacher's friends is found dead.
15	The Frozen Teacher	June 18, 1997; 978-4-09-125045-2	January 16, 2007; 978-1-4215-0445-2
141. "Missing!?" (ない!?, Nai!?); 142. "The Missing Murder Weapon" (消えた凶器, Kieta Kyōki); 143. "The Truth, Through Tears" (涙で語る真実, Namida de Kataru Shinjitsu); 144. "A Similar Voice?!" (声が似てる!?, Koe ga Niteru!?); 145. "What Do They Want?" (狙うは..., Nerau wa...); 146. "Duet?!" (デュエット!?, Dyuetto!?); 147. "Finger Licking" (指をペロッ!?, Yubi o Perō!?); 148. "Some Kind of Magic?!" (魔法を使った!?, Mahō o Tsukatta!?); 149. "The Devil's Summons" (悪魔の呼び声, Akuma no Yobigoe); 150. "The Bloody Bandage" (血染めの包帯, Chizome no Hōtai)
Conan has Rachel reveal the murderer to be the teacher, who used her wig to strangle her victims. The Junior Detective League run into Minami Takayama of Two-Mix. Minami is kidnapped and the kidnappers demand the kids deliver a tape containing Two Mix's new song. Conan takes them the tape where the lyrics reveal Two Mix are witnesses who can provide testimonies connecting the kidnappers to a recent murder. The kidnappers are soon apprehended and Conan, and his friends, sing on stage during Two Mix's concert. Afterwards, Richard finds a loan manager murdered by cyanide poisoning. Conan investigates and reveals the poison was in the water boiler and declares the identity of the culprit. Richard is hired to search for a rich man's first love, where their investigations will be joined by Harley and his father. During their stay at the mansion, the rich man's son-in-law is killed.
16	The Black Star	August 9, 1997; 978-4-09-125046-9	March 20, 2007; 978-1-4215-0881-8
151. "Murderer in White" (白き殺人者, Shiroki Satsujinsha); 152. "The Phone Call" (真実の電話, Shinjitsu no Denwa); 153. "Bonds of Fire" (炎の絆, Honō no Kizuna); 154. "Mystery at School" (学校の不思議, Gakkō no Fushigi); 155. "Someone's There?!" (誰かいる!?, Dareka Iru!?); 156. "Chance Encounter" (邂逅, Kaikō); 157. "Disappearance" (消滅, Shōmetsu); 158. "Party Crasher" (気配, Kehai); 159. "Final Act" (終極, Shūkyoku); 160. "The Potter's Plot" (陶芸家達の企み, Tōgeika-tachi no Takurami)
The rich man's son is the prime suspect, but his corpse is soon found in a fountain. Conan and Harley investigate and realize the secretary is the murderer. After the son's suicide she had murdered the son-in-law, after pretending to help him murder the rich man. The Junior Detective League investigate why school props are being moved around at night. They discover their teacher, Sumiko Kobayashi had been using them to practice teaching her students. Later Rachel runs into a boy who resembles Jimmy, causing her to believe he is cheating on her. At the same time the Phantom Thief Kid sends a notice to the Sebastian household, that he intends to steal the pearl called the Black Star. Conan fails to capture the Kid, who escapes after being surrounded by officers. The Sebastian family hold a party on a cruise ship where everyone wears a special pearl on their shirt with only one of them being real Black Star. Kid steals the real Black Star but is confronted by Conan upon realizing Kid can instantly disguise himself as anyone. On the streets, Rachel sees the boy again and realizes he is not Jimmy. Richard is invited to the house of a famous potter to share his detective stories. While there, the potter's daughter-in-law is found hanged.
17	Time for Trouble	November 18, 1997; 978-4-09-125047-6	May 15, 2007; 978-1-4215-0882-5
161. "Immovable Proof" (動かぬ証拠, Ugokanu Shōko); 162. "Killed with Sound?" (音で殺す!?, Oto de Korosu!?); 163. "Three Schemes" (三つの謀, Mittsu no Hakarigoto); 164. "The Weapon That Got Away" (逃げた凶器, Nigeta Kyōki); 165. "Not Forgotten" (忘れちゃいない, Wasurechainai); 166. "What to Do?" (どうしよう!?, Dōshyō!?); 167. "The Clock" (時計が..., Tokei ga...); 168. "A Demon?" (鬼が出た!?, Oni ga Deta!?); 169. L.N.R"; 170. "The Actors" (役者が揃った, Yakusha ga Sorotta)
Conan realizes the victim was placed on top of the shelves before falling to her death, which created a false time of death. He tranquilizes Richard and declares one of the potter's apprentices as the murderer. Later, Rachel organizes a beach vacation in an attempt to get her parents, Richard and Eva, back together. Eva loses her wedding ring and hopes Richard will notice. His indifference to her ring has her focused on divorcing him. At the beach, a woman is attacked by a sea snake. Conan suspects it was an attempted murder and reveals the victim's friend was the culprit due to a conflict in romance. Richard presents Eva with her ring, having found it when she has lost it, and slightly rekindles their relationship. Richard later receives a request letter to investigate the mysteries of a mansion full of clocks that the writer has inherited. Met by the two owners, Conan's investigation leads him to realize the two men kidnapped the writer as they seek the treasure hidden in the mansion. After apprehending the criminals, Conan reveals the cuckoo clock contains a jeweled watch intended for the writer, passed down from her grandfather. A famous actor hires Richard to help him fit in the role of a detective. The actor murders his wife and frames another actor for it.
18	What Little Girls Are Made Of	January 17, 1998; 978-4-09-125048-3	July 17, 2007; 978-1-4215-0883-2
171. "The Same?" (同じはずなのに..., Onaji Hazu na no ni); 172. "Two Rooms" (二つの部屋, Futatsu no Heya); 173. "First Love" (初恋の人..., Hatsukoi no Hito...); 174. "The Burning Truth" (燃える真実, Moeru Shinjitsu); 175. "To Win a Heart" (心は開く!?, Kokoro wa Hiraku!?); 176. "The Transfer Student" (転校生は..., Tenkōsei wa...); 177. "Woman in Black" (黒ずくめの女, Kurozukume no Onna); 178. "Code Name: Sherry" (コードネーム・シェリー, Kōdo Nēmu Sherī); 179. "The False Girl" (偽りの少女, Itsuwari no Shōjo); 180. "Checkmate" (チェックメイト, Chekkumeito)
Conan reveals the actor to be the murderer when he realizes the murder occurred on the floor above. A girl, claiming to be Jimmy's first love, seeks to invite Kudo to attend a party consisting of mystery fans. Richard, Rachel, Serena, and Conan are invited instead. After the party the girl's apartment catches fire and her death is deemed a suicide attempt by the police. Conan investigates and reveals the culprit used a fax machine to start the fire. The girl later explains to Rachel how Jimmy rejected her advances, stating he likes another girl. The Junior Detective League are asked to search for the missing student's big brother who was captured by a mysterious woman dressed in black. Conan accepts, believing she is in league with Gin and Vodka. The Junior Detective League investigate, along with new student Anita Hailey. After finding the brother and apprehending the criminals, Conan realizes the woman is not a companion of Gin and Vodka. Anita reveals to Conan that she is the inventor of the poison that shrank him, APTX 4869, and is part of the syndicate Gin and Vodka work for, the Black Organization. She tells him a professor has a floppy disk containing data on the poison which will allow her to make an antidote to it. Agasa takes the two to the professor's home, only to find him murdered.
19	And Then There Were Two	April 18, 1998; 978-4-09-125049-0	September 18, 2007; 978-1-4215-0884-9
181. "Why?" (どうして..., Dōshite....); 182. "The Mystery Writer Vanishes" (蒸発した文士, Jōhatsu Shita Bunshi); 183. "Half of the Top" (½の頂点, Nibun no Ichi no Chōten); 184. "When in France" (フランスにて..., Furansu nite...); 185. "Gourmet City" (食いだおれの街, Kuida Ore no Machi); 186. "The Fourth Wallet" (四人目の財布, Yoninme no Saifu); 187. "Inside the Wallet" (財布の中の..., Saifu no Naka no...); 188. "The Secret of the Driver's Licenses" (免許証の秘密, Menkyoshō no Himitsu); 189. "The Burst Ball" (狙われたボール, Nerareta Bōru); 190. "56,000 Hostages" (5万6千人の人質, Goman-rokusen'nin no Hitojichi)
Supposedly a locked room murder, Conan reveals the key was dragged back into the room with the use of an answering machine and reveals the identity of the culprit. After attempting to read the floppy disk, the virus on it destroys all the information about the Black Organization. The daughter of a mystery writer asks Richard to investigate her parents' disappearance. Apparently her father's manuscript has been faxed to his editor and contains a challenge to detectives. Conan decodes the message realizing one kanji is half a message and using a french dialect reveals the location of the writer. Once there, the writer's wife reveals her husband wished someone would solve the hidden message before he died. Conan, Rachel, and Richard are given a tour of Osaka by Harley and Kazuha Toyama. They become involved in a serial murder case, where the victims are stabbed through the wallet and heart with a knife. Conan and Harley realize the serial murderer is the police officer accompanying them, who is avenging the death of his father, a driver instructor, and the victims were his students. The Junior Detective League attend a soccer match when the police are informed of a killer who threatens to start a massacre in the crowded stadium.
20	Conan's Sense of Snow	July 18, 1998; 978-4-09-125050-6	November 20, 2007; 978-1-4215-0885-6
191. "An Eye in the Distance" (遠くからの眼, Tōku kara no Me); 192. "Run Away!" (逃げろ!, Nigero!); 193. "In a Snowy Meadow" (雪原の中で..., Setsugen no Naka de...); 194. "Suspicious Movement" (怪しい動き, Ayashii Ugoki); 195. "Investigation" (探索, Tansaku); 196. "Discovery" (発露, Hatsuro); 197. "Sayonara" (サヨナラ..., Sayonara...); 198. "Visible Evidence" (証拠が見える, Shōko ga Mieru); 199. "Sisterly Feelings" (姉思い..., Ane Omoi...); 200. "Invitation to a Castle" (孤城ヘの誘い, Kojō e no Izanai)
Conan's investigation leads him to discover the culprit is a camera man and he apprehends him. Rachel and Serena decide to meet some magic fanatics after talking to them online. They arrange to meet on the snowy cottage. After hearing one of their members have been killed, they discover the bridge is burned away, leaving them stranded. Someone begins shooting crossbows at the cottage, leading to them speculate about an outside attack. Conan realizes a contraption of strings connected to a crossbow was the cause and reveals one of the fanatics as the culprits. Conan later confronts another fanatic revealed to be the Phantom Thief Kid who had been secretly assisting his investigation. The Junior Detectives decide to seek shelter at a castle when they forget their camping equipment. Conan learns about the castle's hidden treasure and ends up in secret passage where he finds a dead body. Shortly afterwards, he is attacked from behind.
