= Gatins =

Gatins is a surname. Notable people with the surname include:

- Frank Gatins (1871–1911), American baseball player
- John Gatins (born 1968), American film screenwriter, director, and actor
