= Deborah Gatton =

American voice actor

- Born: Burbank, California, U.S.
- Other name: Debbie Gatton
- Occupation: Voice actress
- Years active: 2014–present
- Website: https://www.debbiegatton.com/

Deborah Gatton is an American voice actress of anime, animation and video games known for her distinctive loud voice.

== Filmography ==
=== Television ===
List of voice performances in anime
Year	Title	Role	Notes	Source
2011	Hunter × Hunter	Kiriko's Daughter, Shopkeeper B	2011 series	
2015	Friends of Heartlake City	Naomi		
2017	Berserk	Pepe	English Dub	
2017–19	JoJo's Bizarre Adventure	Boy 16-A, Flight Attendant, Desk Clerk, Boy B	English Dub	
2017	Shopkins	Tiara Sparkles		
2018	Record of Grancrest War	Eudokia	English Dub	
2020	The Ol' Timey Spectral Hour	Heather		
2020	Case Closed Episode One: The Great Detective Turned Small	Aiko	TV series	

=== Video games ===
List of voice performances in video games
Year	Title	Role	Notes	Source
2016	Eternal	Blazing Renegade, Bold Adventurer, Champion of Chaos, Emerald Acolyte, Fevered Scout, Ice Sprite, Lethrai Ranger, Rebel Sharpshooter, and Silverwing Commander		
2016	Lucid9: Inciting Incident	Rui Hayata		
2017	Shiness: The Lightning Kingdom	Kaorys		
