= List of Slayers light novels =

First volume of Slayers, released in Japan by Fujimi Fantasia Bunko on January 17, 1990.

Slayers is a Japanese light novel series written by Hajime Kanzaka and illustrated by Rui Araizumi. The story focuses on the adventures of teenage sorceress Lina Inverse. Slayers began serialization in Dragon Magazine in 1989, before the chapters were collected into individual volumes by Fujimi Fantasia Bunko starting in 1990. As of 2024, the main series consists of 17 volumes.

In North America, the first eight volumes were published in English by Tokyopop from 2004 to 2008. J-Novel Club licensed the series for English publication in 2020 and released the novels digitally before printing them in 3-1 omnibus hardcover books.

== Slayers ==
No.	Title	Original release date	English release date
1	The Slayers; Sureiyāzu! (スレイヤーズ!)	January 17, 1990; 978-4-8291-2345-4	September 7, 2004 (Tokyopop); August 17, 2020 (J-Novel Club); 978-1-59532-094-0
1: Beware! Bandit Bullying and a Place for the Night; 2: Bad Guys Come, Even When You Most Expect Them; 3: Bad News! They Caught Me (Pretty Sad, I Know...); 4: Finally! A Chance to Show My Stuff!; Epilogue
Teenage sorceress Lina Inverse meets and starts traveling to Atlas City with the chivalrous swordsman Gourry Gabriev. With Lina unknowingly in possession of the philosopher's stone, they are pursued by chimeric sorcerer Zelgadis Graywords and his henchmen, including Dilgear, Zolf and Rodimus, as well as the world-famous and seemingly friendly Rezo the Red Priest. Zelgadis seeks the stone to make him powerful enough to defeat Rezo who turned him into a chimera, while Rezo seemingly seeks it to cure his blindness. However, upon attaining and swallowing the philosopher's stone, Rezo is revealed to have been taken over by the Dark Lord Shabranigdu from inside. Befriending and teaming up with Zelgadis, Lina and Gourry defeat Shabranigdu using Gourry's family heirloom, the legendary Sword of Light. After saying goodbye to Zelgadis, Lina sticks with Gourry because she wants the Sword of Light.
2	The Sorcerers of Atlas; Atorasu no Madōshi (アトラスの魔道士)	August 20, 1990; 978-4-8291-2369-0	December 7, 2004 (Tokyopop); October 5, 2020 (J-Novel Club); 978-1-59532-095-7
1: How About Not Taking Every Job That Falls Into Our Laps?; 2: The Strange Creatures Lurking Atlas at Night; 3: The Sealed Sleeper Beneath the Water; 4: Who's Pulling the Strings Here?; 5: For Serious! A Final Battle for Survival; Epilogue
In Atlas City, Lina and Gourry are hired as bodyguards by the sorcerer Talim the Purple. Following the disappearance of Halciform the White, chairman of the city's sorcerers' council, Talim and his fellow vice chairman Daymia the Blue are fighting to take his place. Lina, Gourry and Lantz, Talim's hired mercenary, fight off homunculi and the demons Gio Gaia and Seigram the Faceless, whom they assume were sent by Daymia. Lina and Gourry enter Daymia's house, where they find and free Halciform. Unknown to them, Talim had learned that Halciform was kidnapping and experimenting on townspeople to obtain immortality. Because Halciform has obtained quasi-immortality by making a contract with Seigram and sealing his soul in a pledge stone, Talim recruited Daymia to seal him away. After Halciform has Daymia cursed and kills Talim, Lina and Gourry succeed in breaking the pledge stone and forcing Seigram to flee. Halciform, who also extended his life by consuming Gio, is finally killed when Rubia, the homunculus he created of the dead woman he loved, uses the Sword of Light on him.
3	The Ghosts of Sairaag; Sairāgu no Yōma (サイラーグの妖魔)	February 18, 1991; 978-4-8291-2388-1	March 8, 2005 (Tokyopop); November 9, 2020 (J-Novel Club); 978-1-59532-579-2
1: Attack on Sight!; 2: The Road to Sairaag Is Long, But...; 3: Don't Jump Into Obvious Traps; 4: The Windswept City of the Dead; Epilogue
Lina and Gourry learn that they and Zelgadis have bounties out for their capture, placed by none other than Rezo the Red Priest, whom they thought they killed two months earlier. On the way to Sairaag, where Rezo and the sorcerer Vrumugun have taken over the townspeople, they clash with various henchmen, including the flying fishman Rahannim and demon Vizea. They also reunite with Lantz and Zelgadis, the latter of whom is working with Sylphiel, a shrine maiden and daughter of the high priest of Sairaag, and meet the bounty hunter Eris, whom they drag along for her own safety. After clashing with Rezo in Sairaag, Lina deduces that Eris is Erisiel Vrumugun, a sorceress formerly in Rezo's employ who loved him, and that the current Rezo is a homunculus copy, created by the original for experiments, that Eris is controlling. However, the copy reveals that it is self-aware, kills Eris and, because he can not have revenge for the experiments by killing Rezo himself, decides to prove his superiority by killing those who did. After a battle that sees Sairaag wiped off the map, Lina and company defeat the Rezo copy, who was fused with a demon by its creator. After saying goodbye to Lantz and Zelgadis, Lina and Gourry escort Sylphiel to Saillune City.
4	The Battle of Saillune; Batoru obu Seirūn (聖王都動乱)	October 17, 1991; 978-4-8291-2412-3	June 7, 2005 (Tokyopop); December 14, 2020 (J-Novel Club); 978-1-59532-580-8
1: Typical! Wherever We Go, Drama Finds Us; 2: Why Are They After Me?! What Did I Do?; 3: The Saillune Family Squabble Explodes!; 4: Welp, Guess We'd Better Finish This
In Saillune City, capital of the Holy Kingdom of Saillune, Lina and Gourry reunite Sylphiel with her uncle, who they learn has been secretly sheltering Philionel El Di Saillune, eldest prince of the royal family, since his younger brother Christopher began ordering assassination attempts on Phil and his retainers in order to seize the throne when their ill father dies. Lina and Gourry agree to sneak into the royal palace to inform Amelia, a shrine maiden and Phil's youngest daughter, and Clophel, his valet, that the prince is alive, and to find proof that Chris is behind the assassinations. They succeed in the first goal, but Phil returns to the palace when Chris announces plans to pin the attacks on Clophel, and Lina and Gourry stay at Phil's side as his bodyguards. All parties involved speak of holding peace talks, but the attacks continue, with Lina and Gourry repeatedly fending off Kanzel and the assassin Zuma. Eventually, it is revealed that, while Chris went along with the plan, it is his son Alfred who is chiefly behind the assassinations. After being captured by Amelia, Alfred is killed by Chris when he attempts to attack Phil. Later, before he is killed by Lina, Gourry and Amelia, Kanzel reveals himself to be a mid-ranked demon who was ordered to kill Lina. Lina and Gourry speculate this might have something to do with them previously defeating Shabranigdu, the master of demons, and set off for the Kingdom of Dils to learn more about demons. They are joined by Amelia, who has decided to see the world.
5	The Silver Beast; Shirogane no Majū (白銀の魔獣)	July 13, 1992; 978-4-8291-2454-3	September 6, 2005 (Tokyopop); January 18, 2021 (J-Novel Club); 978-1-59532-581-5
1: Okay, So This Is All Pretty Sudden...; 2: Life Is a Series of Meetings and Partings; 3: Where'd They Go?! A Chaotic Pursuit; 4: The Silver Beast Reborn
Near the village of Mayin, Lina, Gourry and Amelia run into Mazenda, a woman they learn is part of an unnamed local cult that worships Shabranigdu and who seals Lina's magic. During a fight with the werebeasts Vedul and Gilfa, Lina and Amelia are separated from Gourry. Shortly after, Amelia is kidnapped by Balgumon, the cult's number two. Lina meets the mysterious priest Xellos, who tells her he is after a manuscript the cult possesses; "manuscripts" are partial, incomplete copies of the Claire Bible, a legendary tome from another world said to hold the secrets of magic and demons. She also buys his talismans that enhance magical capacity. Xellos pursues and kills Mazenda, which returns Lina's magic, while Lina infiltrates the cult's base. There she reunites with Zelgadis, who is also after the manuscript with the hope it can help him return to being human and with whom she kills Vedul and Gilfa, as well as Amelia. They learn the cult plans to resurrect Zanaffar, the magical beast that destroyed Sairaag 120 years ago, to attack Saillune. The gang fights Duclis, who wears an incomplete Zanaffar as armor, but he is killed by the returning Gourry's Sword of Light. Xellos kills Balgumon and burns the manuscript before disappearing. Lina and company then combat a complete Zanaffar, whom she kills utilizing a new spell equal to the Sword of Light; created thanks to Xellos' talismans.
6	The Darkness in Vezendi; Vezendi no Yami (ヴェゼンディの闇)	March 12, 1993; 978-4-8291-2495-6	December 13, 2005 (Tokyopop); March 11, 2021 (J-Novel Club); 978-1-59532-582-2
1: C'mon, Guys, Don't Go Reviving on Me...; 2: The Battle Starts in Vezendi; 3: On a Journey, Ready for a Showdown; 4: The Darkness Stirs, the Deathmatch Ends; Epilogue
While Gourry and Zelgadis are at an inn, Lina and Amelia are attacked by Zuma, who somehow has both arms that he lost in their previous battle. The assassin retreats when Xellos arrives, but tells Lina to come to Vezendi or someone will die. In Vezendi, the party of five are hired as bodyguards by the merchant Laddock Lanzard, who has received a message from Zuma informing him he is also one of the assassin's targets. Seeking revenge on Lina and Gourry, Seigram attacks with two other demons, Duguld and Guduza, but flees when his masked is cracked. After fending off several other attacks, the final battle sees Lina and company fight Zuma (who is revealed to have fused with Seigram), Duguld, Guduza, and a horde of lesser demons summoned by Raltark, Laddock's butler. It is revealed that Zuma is the alter ego of Laddock. Zuma/Laddock/Seigram is killed by Lina's Ragna Blade, when his human heart causes him to hesitate after meeting eyes with his son. After the group continues their journey to Dils, Xellos admits to Lina alone that he is a demon serving Greater Beast Zellas Metallium, one of the five demon lieutenants created by Shabranigdu, and that he was originally tasked with destroying the Claire Bible manuscripts, but his current job was concocted by Hellmaster Fibrizo and is to protect and guide Lina to the Claire Bible. Knowing she can not defeat the strong demon, Lina accepts Xellos and agrees to keep his identity a secret from her companions for now.
7	Gaav's Challenge; Gāvu no Chōsen (魔竜王の挑戦)	December 10, 1993; 978-4-8291-2536-6	January 2, 2008 (Tokyopop); April 14, 2021 (J-Novel Club); 978-1-4278-0504-1
1: The Castle Town Shrouded in Storm Clouds; 2: To Dragons' Peak in Search of Legend; 3: Adrift, the Golden Lord of Darkness; 4: And Now... Chaos Dragon
After a brief encounter with Raltark, Lina and her friends arrive in Gyria City, the capital of the Kingdom of Dils. They learn the royal guard's new general, Rashart, is recruiting sorcerers and teaching black magic to regular soldiers, as well as sending messengers to the nearby elf and dragon villages. Fearing an attack on the Kataart Mountains, a demon stronghold, Lina and company investigate. After being invited to the castle by Rashart, Lina is attacked by demons and Gyria is destroyed. Lina deduces that Chaos Dragon Gaav is the one behind the demons trying to kill her, that he is at odds with Shabranigdu's four other lieutenants, and planning to start a war against them after allying with dragons, elves and humans. Xellos leads Lina and company to Dragons' Peak, a dragon settlement where a door to the Claire Bible resides, while fending off Raltark and Rashart. Escorted by Milgazia, the golden dragon elder, Lina interacts with the Claire Bible; which is the epicenter of a spacetime disruption, formed 1,000 years ago by the clash between Shabranigdu and Aqualord, where otherworldly information flows. Lina learns the secret behind her Giga Slave spell, but is interrupted by Raltark and the door destroyed. Xellos and Lina kill Raltark, but Rashart flees. Xellos explains that Gaav plans to destroy the Shabranigdu sealed in the Kataart Mountains because Gaav has a human body that will be destroyed along with the rest of the world if the Dark Lord is revived. Rashart returns with Gaav, who severely injures Xellos, and reveals to Lina that it was Xellos who destroyed Gyria in order to quash the army and manipulate Lina against Gaav. Xellos flees while Lina, Gourry, Zelgadis and Amelia fight Gaav.
8	King of the Phantom City; Shiryō-toshi no Ō (死霊都市の王)	July 28, 1994; 978-4-8291-2575-5	January 2, 2008 (Tokyopop); May 28, 2021 (J-Novel Club); 978-1-4278-0505-8
1: Hellmaster Makes His Move; 2: General Rashart Stands in Our Way; 3: Sairaag, an Illusion of the Past; 4: Thou Who Art Blacker Than Darkness, Than Night
Hellmaster Fibrizo appears and easily kills Gaav. After revealing that the Sword of Light is actually "Gorun Nova", a demonic entity and one of Dark Star's five weapons, he kidnaps Gourry and informs Lina he will be in Sairaag. After combating a revenge-seeking Rashart several times, Lina, Zelgadis and Amelia reunite with Sylphiel. She informs them that Sairaag has apparently been restored and joins their quest to rescue Gourry. They find Sairaag exactly as it was before it was destroyed during their last visit, including Sylphiel's father being alive. However, they know it is only an illusion by Fibrizo and enter his Hellpalace, which he controls at will. By threatening her friends, Fibrizo is eventually successful in forcing Lina into casting her newly perfected Giga Slave. He hopes she will be unable to control the spell and it will destroy the entire world. However, it summons the Lord of Nightmares itself using Lina's body as a vessel. Mistakenly thinking Lina has retained control over the spell, Fibrizo attacks her and the Lord of Nightmares obliterates Fibrizo for his transgression. Sylphiel and Amelia return to Saillune, while Zelgadis continues his journey to find a way to regain his humanity. Since Fibrizo sent the Sword of Light back to Dark Star, Lina and Gourry set out to find the latter a new sword.
9	The Mystic Sword of Bezeld; Bezerudo no Yōken (ベゼルドの妖剣)	June 20, 1995; 978-4-8291-2633-2	August 4, 2021 (J-Novel Club); 978-1-7183-7480-5
1: Magic Sword, Where Art Thou?; 2: A Glimpse of Demons in Bezeld; 3: Move Fast! Early Bird Catches the Magic Sword!; 4: And Now, the Sleeping Sword Awakens
After saving a young girl named Sherra from men dressed in black, Lina and Gourry learn she might know where a rumored magical sword might be located in the town of Bezeld. However, Sherra is reluctant to tell them anything and already has another duo, Luke and Mileena, who are pestering her about the sword. Lina and Gourry learn that hordes of demidemons have been appearing around Bezeld recently, with rumors that it is because of the sword. After several clashes with men in black and demidemons, Lina and Gourry team up with Luke and Mileena for a friendly competition for the sword. When Sherra is kidnapped by the men in black, who they suspect are also after the sword, the four mercenaries go to the mountain mines where the sword lies. There, one of the men in black is turned into a dragon-sized mass of flesh as he grips the black sword. This "hyperdemon" has extremely fast regenerative abilities, making any attacks against it useless. After it starts attacking Bezeld, Lina and Luke team up to destroy the hyperdemon. Sherra reveals herself to be the one who created the sword Dulgoffa, which is itself a demon, the one behind the demidemon attacks around Bezeld, and the general of Dynast Graushera. Sherra recovers her black sword, but Lina tricks the demon into withdrawing for now.
10	Conspiracy in Solaria; Soraria no Bōryaku (ソラリアの謀略)	December 21, 1995; 978-4-8291-2658-5	September 22, 2021 (J-Novel Club); 978-1-7183-7482-9
1: Another Day, Another Magic Sword Search; 2: Not a Fan of the Cloak and Dagger Stuff, Y'know?; 3: Battle Breaks Over Solaria at Night; 4: The End of a Lost Kingdom's Dream
While still searching for a new magical sword, Lina and Gourry visit Solaria City after hearing that someone there is collecting them. The duo learn many heavily-guarded military facilities have recently been built in the city and sneak into one where they find a chimera factory. They also clash with men dressed in black, like the ones they encountered some months ago, and receive help from a mysterious man in a mask. Lina and Gourry are then propositioned by Lavas Nexalia Langmeier, the current regent of Solaria due to his father being ill, who claims his older brother Veisam is plotting a rebellion and is the one behind the chimeras. The duo decline the offer and, after sneaking into the castle and seeing the lord is ill from poisoning, determine Lavas is the one behind everything and working with the men in black, some of whom have been fused with demons. Lina and Gourry team up with Luke and Mileena, who were hired by Lavas, and the masked man, who turns out to be Wizer Freion, an inspector whom Lina worked with previously on a case where the monarchy of Ruvinagald were experimenting on humans in order to create demidemons. The quintet storm a human-demon fusion factory and then the castle, where they eventually fight Lavas, who is the former king of Ruvinagald. Lavas has turned himself into a demonoid and wears magical clothing and accessories, making him stronger than most pure demons. After her comrades are all defeated, Lina kills Lavas with her Ragna Blade. The next day, Luke and Mileena declare they will continue their treasure hunting journey, while Gourry has kept a magical sword that he found in Lavas' collection.
11	Delusion in Crimson; Kurimuzon no Mōshū (クリムゾンの妄執)	July 25, 1996; 978-4-8291-2693-6	November 24, 2021 (J-Novel Club); 978-1-7183-7484-3
1: Insurrection?! The World's a Dangerous Place These Days...; 2: Forward Ho! Destination, the Sorcerers' Council!; 3: Showdown in the City of Crimson Water; 4: Crimson, When the Marionettes' Feast Ends
Lina and Gourry learn an insurrection has happened in Crimson Town, perpetrated by the head of the local sorcerers' council, Kailus. Novice sorceress Aria Ashford asks the duo to help save her older sister, Bell, who recently married Kailus. The trio team up with the sorcerer Dilarr and, both on the way and after arriving in Crimson, combat numerous lesser and brass demons created by Zonagein. Dilarr is killed by Aileus, a bizarre plant-like chimera. After killing Zonagein and Kailus, the group learn Bell is actually the one behind everything. After being given Dulgoffa by Sherra, Bell used her new powers to turn the members of Crimson Town's sorcerers' council into chimeras she controlled to start the insurrection in Kailus' name as revenge for him killing her fiancé. With her goal complete, Bell, who is now fully fused with Dulgoffa, wants to kill Aria and herself. Aria sacrifices her life in order to give Lina the opening to kill Bell with her Ragna Blade.
12	The Dynast Plot; Hagun no Sakudō (覇軍の策動)	April 18, 1997; 978-4-8291-2740-7	January 20, 2022 (J-Novel Club); 978-1-7183-7486-7
1: Ah, the Demons One Meets on the Road; 2: The Shadows Lurking in Gyria; 3: The Castle at Night, Consumed in Flames; 4: The Ancient Dragon Knows the Dynast Army's Plans
After reporting what happened in Crimson Town to the sorcerers' council, Lina and Gourry are tasked with investigating a series of mass spawnings of lesser and brass demons in the Kingdom of Dils. They come across Luke and Mileena, who have been hired by Jade Caudwell, a knight from Dils' capital of Gyria City. A mercenary named Sherra has quickly risen through the ranks and effectively controls the kingdom with the king's complete trust. Realizing it is their old enemy of the same name, the two parties team up and head to Gyria City, clashing with demons along the way. After storming the castle, the group learn the demons they have been fighting are humans who were temporarily possessed by Dulgoffa just long enough to weaken their wills, so they can then be possessed by low-ranking demons from the astral plane. Together, the group defeat Sherra. But Lina feels it was too easy, and believes she saw the general of Dynast Graushera smiling as she struck her with the final blow. At the end of the book, Milgazia bumps into Lina and her three companions and informs them that he suspects the mass demon spawnings have something to do with Dynast Graushera plotting another Incarnation War.
13	Presages of Incarnation; Kōma e no Dōhyō (降魔への道標)	November 27, 1998; 978-4-8291-2856-5	April 6, 2022 (J-Novel Club); 978-1-7183-7488-1
1: The Demons Act, Their Goals Unknown; 2: Upon Return to the City, a Glimpse of Demons; 3: The Demons Hiding in the Palace Assemble; 4: The Shadow Looming Behind the Throne
With the dragons and elves in agreement that demons are plotting another Incarnation War, Milgazia and his elf companion Memphys Rhinesword ask Lina, Gourry, Luke and Mileena to help them investigate. They return to Gyria City after learning that the demidemon spawnings have continued there and that there is now an unusual order for no one to enter or leave the castle, not even the guards. Lina and company enter the castle and combat several demons, including Sardian, the trade minister, Farial, the king's sorcerer, and Jade, who has been turned into a demon. Lina then deduces that Dynast Graushera has been masquerading as King Wells Xeno Gyria this whole time and the party battles him. When Gourry's sword breaks, it is revealed to actually be the legendary Blast Sword, a weapon known for its sharpness. The group works together by having Memphys' Zanafa armor attach itself to Dynast, sealing him off from the astral plane and his real body, and taking turns attacking, allowing Lina an opening to deal the final blow with her Ragna Blade. Although they succeed in destroying his corporal form, Dynast's real body still exists. Despite never learning exactly what the demon lieutenant was plotting, the three duos each go their separate ways.
14	Hatred in Selentia; Serentia no Zōo (セレンティアの憎悪)	July 21, 1999; 978-4-8291-2904-3	June 15, 2022 (J-Novel Club); 978-1-7183-7490-4
1: The World Is Never Free of Power Struggles; 2: Sparking the Flame of Hatred in Selentia; 3: The Priests' Blood Flows in the Darkness of Night; 4: The Darkness in the Human Heart
Stopping in the Kingdom of Ralteague's Selentia City, Lina and Gourry are tasked by its sorcerers' council with mediating the struggle to name the next high priest. After the previous high priest died in a fire two months ago, the four head priests suspect murder and have each hired mercenaries as protection. Coincidentally, Luke and Mileena have been hired by Head Priest Ceres Laurencio. When Lina deduces the fire was not accidental, assassins kill Head Priest Bran Conchnir. During an ambush on the quartet by mercenaries and assassins, Mileena is cut by a poisoned blade. When she dies, Luke loses control and seeks revenge; he dismembers the assassin who cut her, kills Head Priest Francis Dmitri for hiring said assassin (despite him not having ordered the attack), and kills Head Priest Ryan Seinford for having turned them away when they sought medical attention for her at his temple. Each time, Lina and Gourry fail to stop him. Luke then heads for Ceres, because the medical care he gave Mileena was not enough to save her. After seeing Luke fight his former comrades Lina and Gourry, Ceres willingly offers his life in order to stop the chaos, but Luke flees. Two days later, Ceres takes himself out of the running to be the next high priest. With three of the head priests having claimed to have "heard the voice of God", Lina deduces they must have heard an actual voice and that it was a demon manipulating them. After coaxing Tzenui out, Lina easily defeats the demon with her Dragon Slave.
15	The Demon Slayers! Demon Sureiyāzu! (デモン・スレイヤーズ!)	May 10, 2000; 978-4-8291-2966-1	August 10, 2022 (J-Novel Club); 978-1-7183-7492-8
1: They're Back?! The Goofy Elf and Dragon Duo!; 2: Every Time I Travel, We Meet Halfway; 3: A Meeting in a Distant Land, Under a Foreign Sky; 4: Demon Slayers
Not only have the demon spawnings continued, but the demons appearing have gotten stronger and more intelligent, and the planet is experiencing unusual weather. Lina and Gourry bump into and team up with Milgazia and Memphys again, and the party heads to Sairaag City after realizing that a demon has taken on Lina's appearance in order to lure them there. On the way, they are attacked by demons several times, including by Bradu, but other demons appear and thwart the attempts, including Xellos. When they reach Sairaag, Lina and Gourry are separated from Milgazia and Memphys by being sent to another world created by Ruby-Eye Shabranigdu where magic is abundant, meaning Lina does not have to chant to cast spells and Gourry's sword is stronger. Here, more than two years after they defeated him the first time, a masked Shabranigdu challenges the duo again in order to prove his authority. Gourry deduces that they are actually fighting Luke, who reveals himself and explains he willingly merged with the Shabranigdu fragment inside him after being unable to get over Mileena's death and coming to hate the entire world; humans and demons alike. Graushera was copying what Fibrizo had done 1,000 years prior; cause war and destruction in order to find and awaken a fragment of Shabranigdu hidden in someone's soul. Sherra's smile at death was because she identified Luke as the host when he grabbed Dulgoffa and was not consumed. Luke plans to merge with the Shabranigdu frozen in the Kataart Mountains, destroy the world, and then themselves. After Gourry is sidelined, Lina destroys Luke/Shabranigdu by individually bursting and attacking with her four talismans that enhance magical capacity that she bought from Xellos, each representing one of the Dark Lords from the four worlds. The last one, representing Shabranigdu himself, only works because Luke wanted to die so he can see Mileena again. Milgazia and Memphys depart to kill any remaining demons, while Lina and Gourry set off to visit Lina's family in Zephyr City.
16	A Chance Encounter in Atessa; Atessa no Kaikō (アテッサの邂逅)	October 20, 2018; 978-4-04-072905-3	October 26, 2022 (J-Novel Club); 978-1-7183-7494-2
1: Shadows Circle the City of Smiths; 2: A Reunion of Allies in Atessa; 3: Unleashed, the Hunting Dogs Bare Their Fangs; 4: Standing Silently in the Forest of Discord
17	The Long Road Home; Harukanaru Kiro (遥かなる帰路)	October 19, 2019; 978-4-04-073377-7	January 4, 2023 (J-Novel Club); 978-1-7183-7496-6
1: Suddenly, I Found Myself in an Unfamiliar Town; 2: Being a Peerless Spellcaster Isn't All Good; 3: On the Run, With Glimpses of Pursuers Behind; 4: En Route to the Border, the Sight that Awaits Us...

== Slayers Special ==
No.	Title	Release date	ISBN
1	The Prince of Saillune 白魔術都市の王子	July 17, 1991	978-4-8291-2405-5
2	Little Princess; Ritoru Purinsesu (リトル・プリンセス)	March 16, 1992	978-4-8291-2431-4
3	Naga's Adventure; Nāga no Bōken (ナーガの冒険)	October 13, 1992	978-4-8291-2464-2
4	Plot of the Sorcerer's Guild 魔道士協会の陰謀	June 11, 1993	978-4-8291-2506-9
5	Fight! Our High Priest 戦え! ぼくらの大神官	October 12, 1993	978-4-8291-2527-4
6	Knockdown! Hero-sama; Datō! Yūsha-sama (打倒! 勇者様)	October 12, 1994	978-4-8291-2591-5
7	Good Luck, Necromancer がんばれ死霊術士	January 17, 1995	978-4-8291-2604-2
8	Terrible Future 恐るべき未来	July 20, 1995	978-4-8291-2637-0
9	Ileez's Travels; Irīzu no Tabiji (イリーズの旅路)	April 19, 1996	978-4-8291-2681-3
10	Being a Goddess of Destruction is Hard; Hakai-shin wa Tsurai yo (破壊神はつらいよ)	October 25, 1996	978-4-8291-2711-7
11	Violent Race! Stagecoach! 激走! 乗合馬車!	July 18, 1997	978-4-8291-2759-9
12	The Maid Might Witness It 家政婦は見たかもしんない	December 16, 1997	978-4-8291-2789-6
13	Respect is Depressing 仰げば鬱陶し	July 17, 1998	978-4-8291-2826-8
14	Haunted Night? Hōnteddo Naito? (ホーンテッド・ナイト?)	October 13, 1999	978-4-8291-2923-4
15	April's Casebook; Eipuriru no Jikenbo (エイプリルの事件簿)	July 14, 2000	978-4-8291-2983-8
16	Scramble Grill; Sukuranburu Guriru (スクランブル・グリル)	December 20, 2000	978-4-8291-1316-5
17	Small, Strong Melody 小さな濃いメロディ	June 20, 2001	978-4-8291-1362-2
18	Dispute About the Succession of the Ranger 跡継騒動 森林レンジャー	December 20, 2001	978-4-8291-1398-1
19	Lunatic Festival; Runateku Esutebaru (るなてく・へすてばる)	July 18, 2002	978-4-8291-1450-6
20	Mission Possible; Misshon Poshiburu (ミッション・ポシブル)	February 20, 2003	978-4-8291-1498-8
21	Thy Name is Sweet Potato; Nanji Sononaha Suīto Poteto (汝その名はスイートポテト)	August 20, 2003	978-4-8291-1544-2
22	G Hunter Folkus; Jī Hantā Forukusu (Gハンター・フォルクス)	February 20, 2004	978-4-8291-1589-3
23	Break of Destiny; Bureiku obu Disutinī (ブレイク・オブ・ディスティニー)	October 25, 2004	978-4-8291-1654-8
24	Threat of the Underground Kingdom 地底王国の脅威	April 20, 2005	978-4-8291-1710-1
25	Encouragement of Chivalry 騎士道のススメ	October 20, 2005	978-4-8291-1763-7
26	Missing Saint; Misshingu Seinto (ミッシング・セイント)	April 25, 2006	978-4-8291-1811-5
27	Stamp to Kill; Sutanpu tu Kiru (スタンプ・トゥ・キル)	July 25, 2006	978-4-8291-1839-9
28	Potion Scramble; Pōshon Sukuranburu (ポーション・スクランブル)	January 25, 2007	978-4-8291-1893-1
29	Magical Old Woman Princia 魔法の老女プリンシア	July 20, 2007	978-4-8291-1944-0
30	The Silver Bullet; Shirogane no Dangan (白銀の弾丸)	January 19, 2008	978-4-8291-3258-6

== Slayers Delicious ==
No.	Title	Release date	ISBN
1	Lina's Great Fashion Strategy リナちゃん♥おしゃれ大作戦	March 6, 1997	978-4-04-700142-8
2	Forest of the Curse-Magic Sorceress 呪術士の森	July 10, 1997	978-4-04-700177-0
3	Mountain of Giant Beasts 巨大生物の山	July 25, 1998	978-4-04-700248-7
4	Lunatic Festival; Runateku Esutebaru (るなてく・へすてばる)	July 12, 1999	978-4-04-700278-4

== Slayers Smash. ==
No.	Title	Release date	ISBN
1	Surpassing the Lion Test 獅子の試練を乗り越えて	July 19, 2008	978-4-8291-3307-1
2	Academy Feast; Akademī Fesuta (アカデミーフェスタ)	January 25, 2009	978-4-8291-3369-9
3	The Sticky Season ねちゃねちゃの季節	October 20, 2010	978-4-8291-3577-8
4	The Resurrected King; Yomigaeru Ō (蘇る王)	April 20, 2011	978-4-8291-3636-2
5	The Girl Falls in Love 恋せよオトメ	November 19, 2011	978-4-8291-3700-0
