= Setsuna =

Setsuna (刹那) is a Japanese word meaning "a moment; an instant". The word came from a Buddhist term meaning "split second," which was imported from the Chinese language but originated in India (Sanskrit: क्षण, ksana). It can also be used as a given name as-is or with different kanji.

== Fictional characters ==
- Setsuna Sanzenkai, the protagonist of Island (video game).
- Setsuna F. Seiei, the main protagonist of Mobile Suit Gundam 00.
- Setsuna, a character in the fighting game series The Last Blade.
- Setsuna Tokage, a character in My Hero Academia.
- Setsuna (real name Ren Fuji), the protagonist in the Dies Irae visual novel and anime series. Later, he becomes an antagonist in Kaijiri Kamui Kagura, a sequel.
- Setsuna Meioh (also known as Sailor Pluto, Sailor Guardian of Space-Time), a supporting character in Sailor Moon manga and anime series.
- Setsuna Sakurazaki, a character in the Negima!: Magister Negi Magi manga and anime series.
- Setsuna Mudou, a character in Angel Sanctuary manga and anime series.
- Setsuna no Takemaru, a character in the film Inuyasha the Movie: Swords of an Honorable Ruler.
- Setsuna Oomido, a character in the Grenadier (manga) and anime series.
- Setsuna Saizuki, a character in the Evil Zone/Eretzvaju video game.
- Setsuna Kiyoura, a character in the Summer Days visual novel and School Days video game and anime.
- Setsuna, a dragon in Flame of Recca.
- Setsuna Honjou, a character in the Majin Tantei Nogami Neuro manga and anime series.
- Setsuna, an antagonist from the Needless manga and anime series.
- Setsuna Ran, triplet leaders of the Ran Clan from Saiunkoku Monogatari.
- Setsuna Higashi, Eas/Cure Passion from Fresh Pretty Cure!.
- Setsuna, a character in Fire Emblem Fates.
- Setsuna, one of three protagonist in the anime television series Yashahime.
- Setsuna, the title character of the video game I am Setsuna.
- "Kurokiri" Setsuna, an antagonist from the manga Buster Keel.
- Setsuna Yuki (優木 せつ菜), a character in Love Live! Nijigasaki High School Idol Club.
- Setsuna Kiryu, a character from Kengan Ashura.
- Setsuna Ogiso, a heroine character in White Album 2.
- Setsuna, a character from Shattered Angels.

== Music ==
- Setsuna, a 2003 album by Kenji Ozawa.
- "Setsuna," a song by Greeeen.
- "SETSUNA DROP", a song by Shouta Aoi.
- "Setsuna Drive" by 9mm Parabellum Bullet, sung by IA
- "Setsuna", a instrumental song by Xomu and Justin Klyvis
- Setsuna, a song by Sunny Day Service.
- Setsuna, a 2018 song by Creepy Nuts.
- "Setsuna Hanabi", a 2026 song by Tomorrow X Together

== Vehicles ==
- Toyota Setsuna
- Toyota Camatte Setsuna
