= Ultimate Deception =

1999 American television film

- DVD Cover
- Genre: Drama
- Written by: Victoria Wozniak
- Story by: David Burton Morris
- Directed by: Richard A. Colla
- Starring: Yasmine Bleeth; Richard Grieco
- Theme music composer: Dennis McCarthy
- Country of origin: United States
- Original language: English

Production
- Producer: Terry Gould
- Cinematography: Laszlo George
- Editor: Ron Wisman
- Production companies: Nasser Group; Orly Adelson Productions; USA Network

Original release
- Network: USA Network
- Release: January 19, 1999

Ultimate Deception (also known as Ultimate Betrayal) is a 1999 made-for-television drama film directed by Richard A. Colla and starring Yasmine Bleeth and Richard Grieco, who were living together in real life at the time the film was produced.

== Plot ==
Terry Cuff (Yasmine Bleeth) is a bartender who yearns to raise a family. When she marries Bobby Woodkin (Richard Grieco) she finds herself one step closer to her dream. However, Bobby has had a vasectomy, is a con artist and, unbeknownst to Terry, kills young mother Dana McThomas (Sabrina Grdevich) and steals her 3-month-old baby, a girl named Gail (Lauren and Marlee Konikoff), so he and Terry can raise the infant as their own daughter.

Bobby fakes a law firm and lawyer so his plan does not fail and that he and Terry can keep the child, renamed "Angie". Later, Terry discovers what Bobby has done and returns baby Gail to her father, Andy (Gordon Michael Woolvett). Bobby is arrested and sentenced to life in prison for Dana's murder and Gail's kidnapping.

== Cast ==
- Yasmine Bleeth as Terry Cuff
- Richard Grieco as Bobby Woodkin
- Gordon Michael Woolvett as Andy McThomas
- Sabrina Grdevich as Dana Ballard
- Robin Brûlé as Cloë
- Nola Augustson as Elaine McThomas
- Philip Granger as Frank McThomas
- James Millington as Ken Pryor
- David Huband as Stan
- Vince Corazza as Det. Gary Falstorm
- Michael Rhoades as Det. Harry Moore
- Geoffrey Bowes as Hay
- Anthony Sherwood as Granger
- Hrant Alianak as Dr. Amos
- Panou as Bud
- Christina Collins as Ms. Richards
- Stephanie Anne Mills as Sheila the Waitress
- Kevin Jubinville as Benji
- Nancy McAlear as Woman on Phone
- Trent McMullen as Cop
- Ann Marin as Woman at Mall
- Matthew Bennett as Federal Building Guard
- Carole Mackereth as Mother
- Jovanni Sy as Desk Sergeant
- Dan Gallagher as Check Cashier
- Marcia Bennett as Bank Manager
- J.C. Kenny as Reporter
- Lauren and Marlee Konikoff as Gail McThomas/Angela "Angie" Woodkin (uncredited)
- Christopher Segovia as Sonny (uncredited)
- Michael Segovia as Sonny (uncredited)
