= Veronica Taylor =

American voice actress

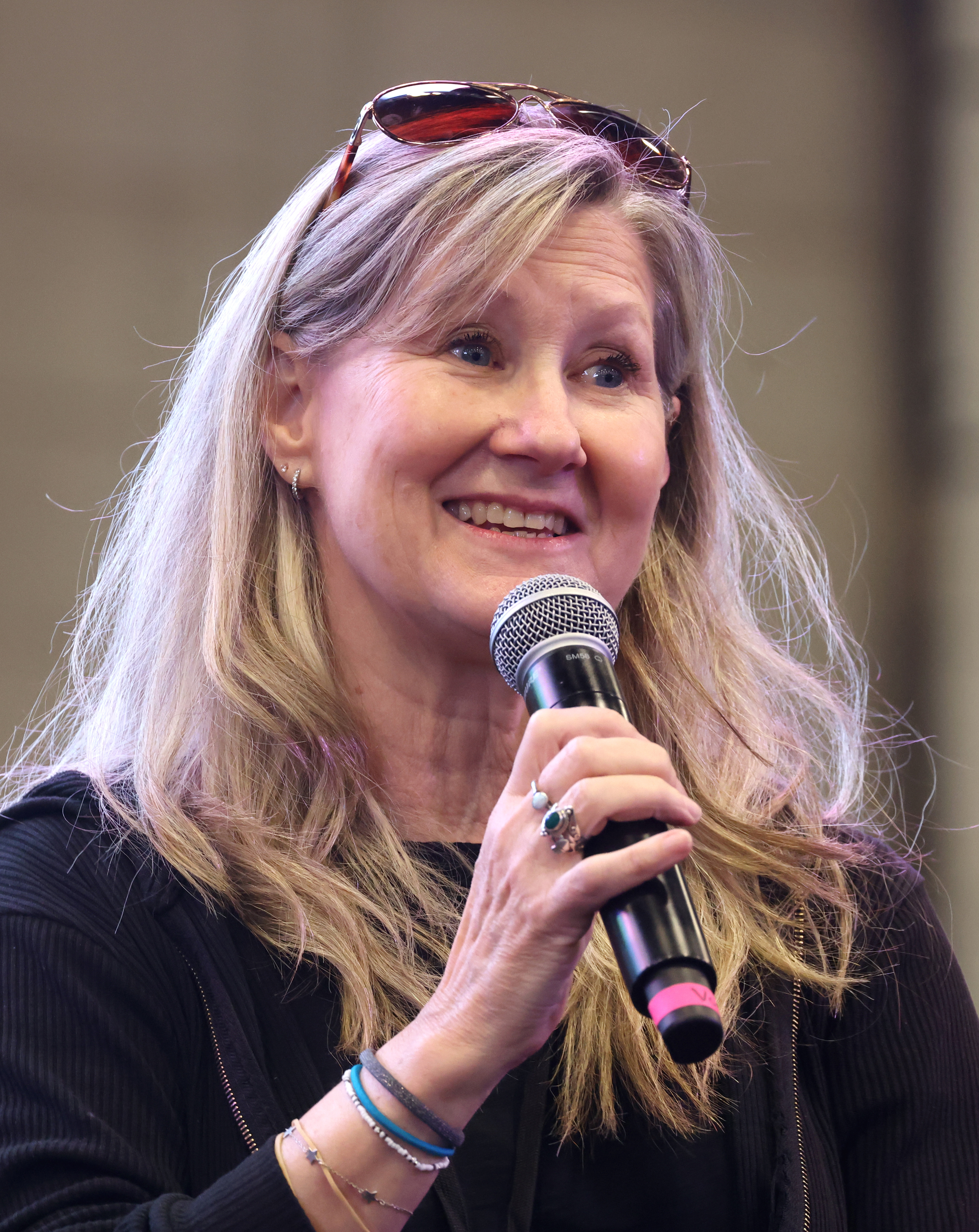
- Taylor in 2026
- Born: Kathleen Charlotte McInerney
- Education: Catholic University of America; Brandeis University
- Occupation: Voice actress
- Years active: 1996–present
- Children: 1
- Website: veronicataylor.net

Kathleen Charlotte McInerney, known professionally as Veronica Taylor, is an American voice actress known for her dubbing work in English-language adaptations of Japanese anime. From 1998 to 2006, Taylor voiced Ash Ketchum and his mother Delia in the Pokémon anime for its first eight seasons. Other voices she has done include Amelia Wil Tesla Seyruun from Slayers, Sailor Pluto from Sailor Moon and Sailor Moon Crystal, Nico Robin in the 4Kids dub of One Piece, April O'Neil in the 2003 Teenage Mutant Ninja Turtles series and has voiced video game characters like Cosmos from Dissidia 012 Final Fantasy, Dissidia Final Fantasy, and Dissidia Final Fantasy NT. Additionally, using her real name, she is a narrator for various audio books, such as the Omen of the Stars arc from the Warriors series.

== Early life ==
Taylor wanted to act professionally since she was in her first play when she was five. She studied acting at The Catholic University of America (CUA) and Brandeis University. Taylor earned a Bachelor of Arts degree in Drama from CUA in 1987 and earned a Master's degree from Brandeis in 1993.

== Career ==
Taylor was featured in numerous plays and toured with National Players under the leadership of William H. Graham, the chairman of Catholic U's Drama Department, and other stage companies in the Washington, D.C. area and other cities all around the United States for a few years before settling in New York.

Her other roles include Ash Ketchum, his mother Delia, and May in the 4Kids dub of the Pokémon anime series, April O'Neil from the 2003 Teenage Mutant Ninja Turtles series, Amelia Wil Tesla Seyruun in the Slayers TV series, voice of Mangchi in the English dub of Hammerboy, the voice of Nico Robin in the 4Kids dub of One Piece, and the voice of Sailor Pluto in the Viz Media dub of Sailor Moon and Sailor Moon Crystal. Taylor said voicing Ash Ketchum was "the greatest responsibility of my life" and "one that changed the trajectory of how I want to be in the world."

Taylor has also narrated audio books written by Judy Blume, Wendy Mass, Danielle Steel, Linda Castillo, Russell Ginns, Louise Erdrich, and Mary Kay Andrews among others. She has also narrated for Gayle Foreman.

== Personal life ==
Taylor has one daughter, Rena, born in 1998. After living in New York City, New York, she relocated to Los Angeles, California in 2015.

Taylor has developed strong ties to the Washington, D.C. area and to Boston: playing women's soccer for the Catholic University Cardinals; and being a Commanders, Capitals and Red Sox fan (she lived in the same Arlington neighborhood as legendary wide receiver Art Monk). Both of her parents attended Catholic University and toured with National Players as well.

== Filmography ==
=== Film ===
Year	Title	Role	Notes	Ref.
1997	Art of Fighting	Yuri Sakazaki	English dub	
1998	Grave of the Fireflies	Mother	Central Park Media English dub	
1998	Yu Yu Hakusho: Poltergeist Report	Botan, Yukina	English dub	
1999	Pokémon: The First Movie	Ash Ketchum, Delia Ketchum	English dub	
2000	Pokémon: The Movie 2000	Ash Ketchum, Delia Ketchum	English dub	
2001	Pokémon 3: The Movie	Ash Ketchum, Delia Ketchum	English dub	
2001	Night on the Galactic Railroad	Giovanni	English dub	
2001	Pokémon: Mewtwo Returns	Ash Ketchum	English dub	
2002	Pokémon 4Ever	Ash Ketchum, Towa	English dub	
2003	Hammerboy	Mangchi	English dub	
2003	Jungle Emperor Leo	Lyre	English dub	
2003	Pokémon Heroes	Ash Ketchum	English dub	
2003	The Weathering Continent	Lakushi	English dub	
2004	Pokémon: Jirachi Wish Maker	Ash Ketchum, May	English dub	
2005	Kakurenbo: Hide and Seek	Sorincha, Suku	English dub	
2005	Pokémon: Destiny Deoxys	Ash Ketchum, May	English dub	
2006	Pokémon: Lucario and the Mystery of Mew	Ash Ketchum, May	English dub	
2007	Ratatoing	Maria	English dub	
2008	Impy's Wonderland	Babu	English dub	
2008	Little Spirit: Christmas In New York	Younger Brother, Girl on Santa's Lap	English dub	
2008	Mia and the Migoo	Juliette	English dub	
2009	Turtles Forever	2003 April	English dub	
2010	Animals United	The Mole	English dub	
2011	Rapunzel	Mrs. B	English dub	
2012	The Dino King	Speckles (young)	English dub	
2013	Axel: The Biggest Little Hero	Gaga (young)	English dub	
2014	Ikki Tousen in Kyoto	Gentoku Ryuubi	English dub	
2014	Welcome To The Space Show	Marie	English dub	
2017	Napping Princess	Ikumi Morikawa	English dub	
2018	Sailor Moon S: The Movie	Sailor Pluto/ Setsuna Meio	Viz Media English dub	
2018	Sailor Moon SuperS: Black Dream Hole	Sailor Pluto/ Setsuna Meio	Viz Media English dub	
2019	Dragon Ball Super: Broly	Berryblue	English dub	
2021	Sailor Moon Eternal	Super Sailor Pluto/ Setsuna Meio	English dub	
2024	Sailor Moon Cosmos	Eternal Sailor Pluto/ Setsuna Meio	English dub	

=== Television ===
Year	Title	Role	Notes	Ref.
1996	Legend of Lemnear	Lian	English dub	
1996	The Slayers	Amelia Wil Tesla Seyruun	English dub, second voice	
1998–2006	Pokémon	Ash Ketchum, Delia Ketchum, May, additional voices	English dub, seasons 1–8	
1999	Slayers Next	Amelia Wil Tesla Seyruun, Auntie Aqua	English dub	
2000	Irresponsible Captain Tylor	Shia Has	English dub	
2001	Harlock Saga	Emeraldas, Freya	English dub	
2001	Ping Pong Club	Rika Abe	English dub	
2001	Slayers Try	Amelia Wil Tesla Seyruun	English dub	
2001	Yu-Gi-Oh! Duel Monsters	Chris, Kenta	English dub	
2001	Cubix	Abby	English dub	
2002	Berserk	Griffith (young)	English dub	
2002	His and Her Circumstances	Yukino Miyazawa	English dub	
2002	Legend of Himiko	Himiko Himejima	English dub	
2002	Maetel Legend	Emeraldas	English dub	
2003	Alien Nine	Megumi Hisakawa	English dub	
2003	Samurai Deeper Kyo	Yuya Shiina	English dub	
2003–2009	Teenage Mutant Ninja Turtles	April O'Neil, child Nanobot		
2003–2004	Funky Cops	Additional voices	English dub	
2004	Arcade Gamer Fubuki	Fubuki Sakuragasaki	English dub	
2004	Munto	Yumemi Hidaka	English dub	
2004	Seven of Seven	Nana Suzuki, other Nanas	English dub	
2004	The World of Narue	Narue Nanase	English dub	
2004–2006	One Piece	Nico Robin, young Sanji	4Kids English dub	
2004–2009	Winx Club	Princess Diaspro	4Kids English dub	
2005	Angel Sanctuary	Kurai	English dub	
2005	Genshiken	Tokino Akiyama	English dub	
2005	G.I. Joe Sigma 6	Scarlett	Second voice	
2005	Piano	Hitomi Nomura	English dub	
2005	Mew Mew Power	Ms. Rosbe	English dub	
2005–2008	Yu-Gi-Oh! GX	Fonda Fontaine, Ms. Dorothy, Princess Rose	English dub	
2006	GaoGaiGar: The King of Braves	Mamoru Amami	English dub	
2006	Munto 2: Beyond the Walls of Time	Yumemi Hidaka, Toche	English dub	
2006	Ninja Nonsense	Miyabi	English dub	
2006	Pokémon Chronicles	Delia Ketchum, Ash Ketchum	English dub	
2006	Ah! My Goddess: Flights of Fancy	Chihiro Fujumi, Nozomi the Clairvoyant	English dub	
2006	Dinosaur King	Max Taylor, Aki Taylor	English dub	
2006	To Heart	Aoi Matsubara	English dub	
2006–2010	Chaotic	Skithia, Ajara		
2008–2011	Yu-Gi-Oh! 5D's	Carly Carmine, Haluna, Ancient Fairy Dragon	English dub	
2009	Ikki Tousen: Dragon Destiny	Gentoku Ryuubi	English dub	
2009–2011	Huntik: Secrets & Seekers	Scarlet Burne, Sandra Lambert		
2009–2011	Angel's Friends	Sai, Angelie	English dub	
2010	Iron Man: Extremis	Mallen's Mother, Mother		
2010	Slayers Evolution-R	Amelia Wil Tesla Seyruun	English dub	
2010	Slayers Revolution	Amelia Wil Tesla Seyruun	English dub	
2011	Bakuman	Aiko Iwase, Miyuki Azuki	English dub	
2011–2012	Tai Chi Chasers	Tori	English dub	
2011–2015	Yu-Gi-Oh! ZEXAL	Jen, Ponta, Mira Tsukumo, Meredith	English dub	
2013	Ikki Tousen: Great Guardians	Gentoku Ryuubi, Youjou Bashoku	English dub	
2014	Ikki Tousen: Xtreme Xecutor	Gentoku Ryuubi, Youjou Bashoku	English dub	
2014–2017	Super 4	Ruby	English dub	
2015	Mobile Suit Gundam: The Origin	Astraia Tor Deikun	English dub	
2015–2016	Pretty Guardian Sailor Moon Crystal	Sailor Pluto/ Setsuna Meio	English dub	
2015–2019	Sailor Moon	Sailor Pluto/ Setsuna Meio, Katarina, Unazuki Furuhata, Akumuuda	Viz Media English dub	
2016	Kabaneri of the Iron Fortress	Ayame Yomogawa	English dub	
2017–2019	Dragon Ball Super	Brianne de Chateau/ Ribrianne	Funimation English dub	
2017–2019	Welcome to the Wayne	Yelena Bishop, Computer		
2017–2018	The Ollie & Moon Show	Flight Attendant		
2018–2019	Aria	Akari Mizunashi	English dub	
2019	Kung Fu Pork Choppers	Hampton	English dub	
2019	Didn't I Say to Make My Abilities Average in the Next Life?!	Pauline	English dub	
2019–2022	Rilakkuma and Kaoru	Tokio	English dub	
2020	The 8th Son? Are You Kidding Me?	Vilma	English dub	
2020	Great Pretender	Miki Edamura	English dub	
2020	The God of High School	Yu Mi-Ra	English dub	
2020	Akudama Drive	Executioner Boss	English dub	
2021	Jungledyret Hugo	Rita the Fox	English dub	
2021	The Casagrandes	Plane Computer		
2021	So I'm a Spider, So What?	Ariel	English dub	
2021	The World's Finest Assassin Gets Reincarnated in Another World as an Aristocrat	Goddess/Venus	English dub	
2021–2022	Shaman King	Tamao Tamamura, Iron Maiden Jeanne	English dub, 2021 series	
2021–2023	The Faraway Paladin	Mary	English dub	
2022	In the Land of Leadale	Mai Mai	English dub	
2023	Digimon Adventure:	Lopmon	English dub	

=== Video games ===
Year	Title	Role	Notes	Ref.
2000	Valkyrie Profile	Aelia, Freya, Jayle	English dub	
2000	Pokémon Puzzle League	Ash Ketchum		
2003	Ape Escape 2	Jimmy (Note: The character is known as Jimmy in the North American version of the game, while he is known as Hikaru, same as his original Japanese name, in the United Kingdom and PAL versions of the game.)	American Dub, credited as Kathleen McInerny	
2004	Trivial Pursuit DVD for Kids	Bobby		
2005	One Piece: Grand Battle	Nico Robin	English dub	
2006	One Piece: Grand Adventure	Nico Robin		
2006	One Piece: Pirates Carnival	Nico Robin	English dub	
2006	Sonic the Hedgehog	Princess Elise	She initially voiced Elise before being replaced with Lacey Chabert.	
2007	Tekken 6	Leo Kliesen		
2008	Insecticide	Chrys Liszt		
2009	Dissidia Final Fantasy	Cosmos		
2009	Teenage Mutant Ninja Turtles: Smash-Up	April O'Neil		
2009	Teenage Mutant Ninja Turtles: Turtles In Time Re-Shelled	April O'Neil		
2011	Dissidia 012 Final Fantasy	Cosmos	English dub	
2016	Dragon Ball Xenoverse 2	Brianne de Chateau/ Ribrianne	English dub	
2016	Yu-Gi-Oh! Duel Links	Carly Carmine; Dark Signer	English dub	
2017	Fire Emblem Heroes	Micaiah, Manuela Casagranda	English dub	
2018	Dissidia Final Fantasy NT	Narrator	English dub	
2018	Dragon Ball Legends	Brianne de Chateau/ Ribrianne	English dub	
2018	Valkyria Chronicles 4	Crymaria Raven	English dub	
2019	Fire Emblem: Three Houses	Manuela Casagranda	English dub	
2020	13 Sentinels: Aegis Rim	Tsukasa Okino	English dub	
2021	Nier Replicant ver.1.22474487139...	Additional voices	English dub	
2022	Rune Factory 5	Simone, Julian	English dub	
2022	Fire Emblem Warriors: Three Hopes	Manuela Casagranda	English dub	
2023	Fire Emblem Engage	Micaiah	English dub	
2023	Advance Wars 1+2: Re-Boot Camp	Andy	English dub	
2025	Towa and the Guardians of the Sacred Tree	Eiga (young child), Kenran	English dub	

=== Audiobook Narration ===
Book Release	Title	Author	Notes	Ref.
2009	Fourth Apprentice	Erin Hunter	Warriors: Omen of the Stars series	
2010	Fading Echoes	Erin Hunter	Warriors: Omen of the Stars series	
2010	Night Whispers	Erin Hunter	Warriors: Omen of the Stars series	
2010	Sign of The Moon	Erin Hunter	Warriors: Omen of the Stars series	
2019	Squirrelflight's Hope	Erin Hunter	Warriors series (Super Edition)	
2022	The Registration	Madison Lawson	The Elysian Files series	
2024	The Registration Rewritten	Madison Lawson	The Elysian Files series	

=== Live-action ===
Year	Title	Role	Notes
2008	Adventures in Voice Acting	Herself	Documentary

== Notes ==
Preceded by Susan Aceron	Voice of Sailor Pluto; 2015-present	Succeeded by None
