= Susan Aceron =

Canadian actress and businesswoman

Susan Aceron Gray
- Born: Susan Flores Aceron; July 6, 1972; Tisdale, Saskatchewan, Canada
- Died: October 9, 2016 (aged 44); Edmonton, Alberta, Canada
- Occupations: Actress, businesswoman
- Years active: 1993–2016
- Spouse: Jundee Gray (m. 1996)
- Children: 3

Susan Flores Aceron (July 6, 1972 – October 9, 2016) was a Canadian actress and businesswoman who appeared in several film and television roles. She was best known for voicing Sailor Pluto in the Cloverway English adaptation of Sailor Moon. She also voiced a number of roles in Beyblade.

== Early life ==
Aceron was born in Tisdale, Saskatchewan, to Filipino parents Teresita and Ruben Aceron.

== Personal life ==
Aceron was married to Jundee Gray in 1996 where they have three sons.

== Death ==
On October 9, 2016, Aceron died of nasopharyngeal carcinoma at the age of 44.

== Select filmography ==
- Honey, I Shrunk the Kids: The TV Show – Announcer
- Sailor Moon – Sailor Pluto (Sailor Moon S)
- The Ladies Man – Chinese Lover
- Medabots – Additional voices
- Beyblade – Additional voices
- The In-Laws – Nurse
- This Time Around – Hostess
- The Newsroom – Cashier

Preceded by Sabrina Grdevich	Voice of Sailor Pluto; Eps. 103 – 119	Succeeded by Veronica Taylor
