= Mile Zero (film) =

2001 film

- Directed by: Andrew Currie
- Written by: Michael Melski
- Produced by: Trent Carlson; Blake Corbet
- Starring: Michael Riley; Sabrina Grdevich; Connor Widdows
- Cinematography: Robert Aschmann
- Edited by: Reginald Harkema
- Music by: Don MacDonald
- Production company: Anagram Pictures
- Distributed by: Cinemavault
- Release date: September 23, 2001 (Cinéfest)
- Running time: 92 minutes
- Country: Canada
- Language: English

Mile Zero is a 2001 Canadian drama film, directed by Andrew Currie. The film stars Michael Riley as Derek Ridley, a divorced father who abducts his son Will (Connor Widdows) after his ex-wife Allison (Sabrina Grdevich) tries to limit his contact. Currie's intention for the film was to present a nuanced understanding of the emotional vulnerability that might lead a father to act in this manner, neither demonizing him as a mainstream Hollywood film would likely have done nor portraying him as a hero; it was inspired in part by Currie's own emotions about having to spend a year away from his son while studying at the Canadian Film Centre.

The film premiered at the Cinéfest Sudbury International Film Festival in September 2001, before screening at the 2001 Vancouver International Film Festival as the opening film in the Canadian Perspectives program.

The film received three Vancouver Film Critics Circle award nominations at the Vancouver Film Critics Circle Awards 2001, for Best Canadian Film, Best Actor in a Canadian Film (Riley) and Best Director of a Canadian Film (Currie).
