= Hurt (2003 film) =

- Directed by: Steve DiMarco
- Written by: Steve DiMarco
- Produced by: Joel Awerbuck; Bob Banack
- Starring: Terra Vnesa; Andrew Martin-Smith; Stephanie Nikolaidis
- Cinematography: Ricardo Diaz
- Edited by: Miume Jan Eramo
- Distributed by: Charlotte Bernard Entertainment
- Release date: March 21, 2003 (Canada)
- Country: Canada
- Language: English

Hurt is a 2003 independent Canadian film written and directed by Steve DiMarco.

== Plot ==
One night at a party, three teenagers start a friendship that becomes the most important of their lives. As they grow closer to each other, we begin to see the root of each of their hurts. Stevie's father refuses to deal with the suicide of Stevie's mother and ignores Stevie's need to deal with it. Darla is forced to deal with surviving on her own after her mother abandons them and her sister commits suicide. Boy's heroin addicted father tries to force Boy into procuring his drugs at any cost. These ever-escalating problems push Stevie, Darla and Boy into a darker corner than they've ever been. They decide to fight their way out together.

== Cast ==
- Terra Vnesa as Stevie
- Andrew Martin-Smith as Boy
- Stephanie Nikolaidis as Darla
- Sabrina Grdevich as Boy's Mother
- Alex Poch-Goldin as Boy's Father
- John Ralston as Stevie's Father
- Ron Lea as Darla's Father
- Stavroula Logothettis as Courtenay's Mother
