= Andrew Currie (director) =

Canadian film director and screenwriter

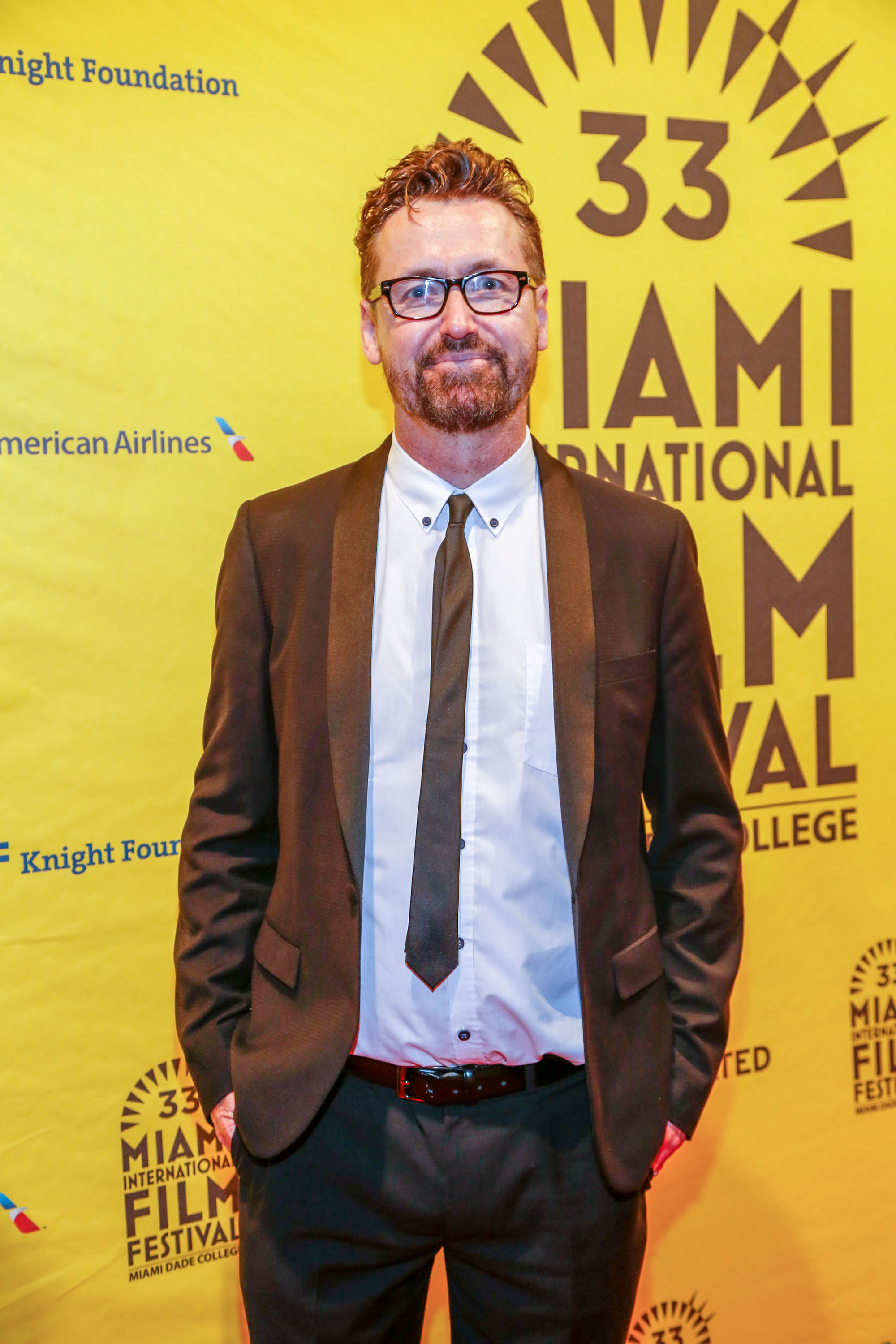
- Currie at the Miami Film Festival presentation of The Steps in 2016
- Occupations: Director, screenwriter

Andrew Currie is a Canadian film director and screenwriter.

Born in England, Currie grew up in Victoria, British Columbia and studied arts before turning his interests towards film. In 1997, Currie moved to Toronto, Ontario to study at the Canadian Film Centre.

== Career ==
In 2001, Currie directed his feature debut, Mile Zero.

In 2006, Currie handled his first larger budget film, Fido, which was shot for "around $9 million." The film, influenced by "Romero's mythology of zombie-ism" and Jacques Tourneur's I Walked with a Zombie, featured performances by Carrie-Anne Moss, Billy Connolly and Dylan Baker.

== Awards ==
Mile Zero appeared at numerous film festivals and won a "WorldFest Platinum Award" in Houston, Texas, a "CityTV Award for Best First Feature" in Victoria, British Columbia, and a "Best Feature Award" at Moondance International Film Festival in Boulder, Colorado.

In 1997, Currie won the "Best New Western Canadian Director" award at the Vancouver International Film Festival for his short film Night of the Living. Currie was nominated for a Best Direction in a Comedy Program or Series Gemini Award for Twisteeria, a half-hour children's comedy made for YTV, in 1999. In 2007, for Fido, he won a special jury prize at the Gérardmer Film Festival and the audience award at the London Canadian Film Festival.

== Partial filmography ==
=== Writer ===
- Persistence of Memory (1993)
- Night of the Living (1997)
- Fido (2006)

=== Director ===
- Persistence of Memory (1993)
- Night of the Living (1997)
- Twisteeria (1998) (TV)
- Mile Zero (2001)
- Sleep Murder (2004) (TV)
- Fido (2006)
- Barricade (2012)
- The Steps (2015)
- The Invisibles (2024)
