= Connor Widdows =

Canadian actor (born 1992)

- Born: January 27, 1992 (age 34); Vancouver, British Columbia, Canada
- Years active: 1999–2011

Connor Widdows (born January 27, 1992) is a Canadian former child actor. He appeared in the second and third film adaptation of the X-Men franchise, X2 and X-Men: The Last Stand, as Jones, a student at Professor Xavier's school who does not need sleep and can control television equipment by blinking. The character was not based on an existing mutant from the X-Men comics.

Widdows has previously appeared as Boxey on the Sci Fi Channel television program Battlestar Galactica. Widdows was slated to make several appearances as Boxey, yet never made it past the miniseries and the first few episodes. As executive producer Ronald D. Moore put it, "Boxey died a hard nasty death on the page and in the editing room, and was last seen haunting the deleted scenes area of the Sci Fi Channel website".

In 2003, Widdows played Cody Banks' younger brother Alex Banks in the movie Agent Cody Banks. He maintained the role in the 2004 sequel, Agent Cody Banks 2: Destination London.

== Personal life ==
Widdows has one younger sister, Sarah, who is also into acting.

His aunt is award-winning casting director and filmmaker Coreen Mayrs, who has been involved in casting many of the films in which Widdows appears.

== Filmography ==
Year	Title	Role	Notes
2000	Beautiful Joe	Anthony	
2001	Say It Isn't So	Boy	
2001	Freddy Got Fingered	Andy Malloy	
2001	Mile Zero	Will	
2002	Liberty Stands Still	Robbie Tyson	
2003	Agent Cody Banks	Alex Banks	
2003	X2	Jones	
2003	Battlestar Galactica (miniseries)	Alex "Boxey" Boxman	
2004	Agent Cody Banks 2: Destination London	Alex Banks	
2004	Battlestar Galactica	Alex "Boxey" Boxman	Episode: "Bastille Day"
2006	X-Men: The Last Stand	Jones	
2006	John Tucker Must Die	Freshman At Beach	
