= Sabrina Grdevich =

Canadian actress

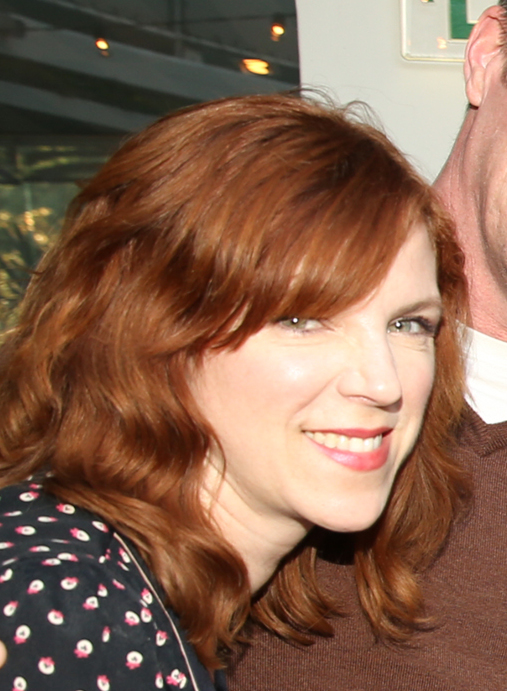
- Born: Brampton, Ontario, Canada
- Occupation: Actress
- Years active: 1994–present

Sabrina Grdevich is a Canadian actress. Sabrina portrayed Dana Ballard in the 1999 made-for-TV movie Ultimate Deception with Yasmine Bleeth. Her starring roles include Mile Zero and Lola. Other roles included playing Cathy Blake in Traders, voice roles of Ann Granger and Sailor Pluto in the Sailor Moon R series, Maxine Reardon, on CBC's Intelligence, and Cynthia in Ginny and Georgia.

== Filmography ==
=== Film ===
| Year | Title | Role | Notes |
|---|---|---|---|
| 1996 | Joe's Wedding | Julie | |
| 1996 | Joe's So Mean to Josephine | Florrie | |
| 1996 | Swiss Family Robinson | | GoodTimes Entertainment |
| 1997 | Men with Guns | Lucy | |
| 1998 | Cold Feet | Jane | Short film |
| 1999 | Dogmatic | Miss Vicky Polite | |
| 1999 | The 4th Floor | Cheryl | |
| 1999 | Johnny | Boutique Clerk | |
| 2000 | Washed Up | Stacy3 | |
| 2000 | Sailor Moon S the Movie: Hearts in Ice | Trista Meio - Sailor Pluto (voice) | |
| 2000 | Sailor Moon Super S the Movie: Black Dream Hole | Trista Meio - Sailor Pluto (voice) | |
| 2001 | A.I. Artificial Intelligence | Sheila | |
| 2001 | Lola | Lola | |
| 2001 | Mile Zero | Allison | |
| 2002 | Secretary | Allison | |
| 2003 | Fast Food High | Cheryl | |
| 2003 | Hurt | Boy's Mom | |
| 2004 | Book of Love | Lilian | |
| 2004 | Trouser Accidents | Shelly | Short film |
| 2004 | The Human Kazoo | Bride | Short film |
| 2005 | Cake | Rachel | |
| 2008 | Green Door | Brenda | Short film |
| 2010 | The Con Artist | India | |
| 2013 | Cottage Country | Sergeant Mackenzie | |
| 2015 | No Stranger Than Love | Nancy | |

=== Television ===
| Year | Title | Role | Notes |
|---|---|---|---|
| 1995 | Little Criminals | Ruth | TV film |
| 1995 | Side Effects | Karen Haywood | Episode: "Feet of Clay" |
| 1995–2000 | Sailor Moon | Anne Granger / Sailor Pluto / Various (voice) | Main role (23 episodes) |
| 1996 | F/X: The Series | Lori Cutter | Episode: "High Risk" |
| 1996–1998 | Traders | Cathy Blake | Regular role (19 episodes) |
| 1997 | The Adventures of Sinbad | Jullaner | Episode: "Monument" |
| 1997 | Once a Thief | Peaches | Episode: "Trial Marriage" |
| 1997 | Major Crime | Madelaine Reid | TV film |
| 1998 | My Own Country | Sexy Sadie | TV film |
| 1998 | Thanks of a Grateful Nation | Sandra | TV miniseries |
| 1999 | Deep in the City | Sydney | Episodes: "It's Cold Out There", "Thicker Than Water" |
| 1999 | Family of Cops 3: Under Suspicion | Fran Smollen | TV film |
| 1999 | Ultimate Deception | Dana Ballard | TV film |
| 1999 | Da Vinci's Inquest | Mona Resnick | Episodes: "The Hunt", "The Capture" |
| 1999 | Milgaard | Nichol Jones | TV film |
| 1999 | Coming Unglued | Lacey | TV film |
| 1999 | Total Recall 2070 | Friend of Mr. Nagle | Episode: "Restitution" |
| 1999 | Sirens | Sheryl | TV film |
| 1999 | Black and Blue | Grace Ann Flynn | TV film |
| 2000 | Get Real | Karen Murphy | Episode: "Support" |
| 2002 | The Eleventh Hour | Pamela Tasker | Episode: "The 37-Year-Itch" |
| 2002 | Jeremiah | Michelle | Episode: "Mother of Invention" |
| 2002 | The Glow | Trish | TV film |
| 2002 | Tom Stone | Laura James | Episodes: "Worm", "Taking Care of Business" |
| 2003 | Tom Stone | Laura James | Episode: "Member of the House" |
| 2003 | Slings and Arrows | Claire Donner | Regular role (6 episodes) |
| 2004 | Puppets Who Kill | Stacey's Twin Sister | Episode: "Rocko and the Twins" |
| 2005 | Tripping the Wire: A Stephen Tree Mystery | Trish Shishleesh | TV film |
| 2005 | A Friend of the Family | Heidi | TV film |
| 2005 | Intelligence | Maxine Reardon | TV film |
| 2006 | Intelligence | Maxine Reardon | Recurring role (4 episodes) |
| 2006 | This Is Wonderland | Maddie Armstrong | Episode: "3.6" |
| 2009 | The Dating Guy | Connie (voice) | Episode: "Wind Tunnel" |
| 2010 | Cra$h & Burn | Nicole Asher | Episode: "Bond Blame Baptize" |
| 2010 | When Love Is Not Enough: The Lois Wilson Story | Julia | TV film |
| 2010 | Rookie Blue | Anna Vetter | Episode: "Hot & Bothered" |
| 2011 | The Listener | Sarah Mirtschin | Episode: "Lady in the Lake" |
| 2011 | Skins | Renée Snyder | Episodes: "Ice Queen", Tony", "Eura/Everyone" |
| 2011 | Flashpoint | Ruth | Episode: "A Day in the Life" |
| 2012 | Saving Hope | Jackie | Episode: "Pink Clouds" |
| 2016 | Slasher: The Executioner | Nancy Vaughn | Recurring role |
| 2016–2020 | Kim's Convenience | Ms. Murray | Recurring role, 5 episodes |
| 2021 | Slasher: Flesh and Blood | Florence Galloway | Main cast |
| 2021–present | Ginny & Georgia | Cynthia Fuller | Recurring role |
| 2021 | Saying Yes to Christmas | Shannon Snyder | TV movie |
| 2023 | Slasher: Ripper | Venetia Botticelli | Main cast |
| 2025 | Heated Rivalry | Woman with Scott | Episode: "Hunter" |

| Preceded by None | Voice of Sailor Pluto; Eps. 68–78, Movies | Succeeded by Susan Aceron |
