= List of Slayers characters =

Main characters from the anime TV series. Front row: Amelia, Gourry, and Lina. Back row: Xellos and Zelgadis

The Slayers light novel series features a cast of characters created by Hajime Kanzaka and illustrated by Rui Araizumi. It follows the adventures of teenage sorceress Lina Inverse and her companions as they journey through their world. Using powerful magic and swordsmanship, they battle difficult overreaching wizards, demons seeking to destroy the world, dark lords, and the occasional hapless gang of bandits. Slayers has been adapted into several manga series, five televised anime series, two three-episode original video animations, and five anime films where events and characters differ significantly from the original novels.

== Major characters ==
=== Lina Inverse ===
Voiced by: Megumi Hayashibara (Japanese); Lisa Ortiz (TV series), Cynthia Martinez (OVAs and films) (English)

Lina Inverse (リナ・インバース, Rina Inbāsu) is the main protagonist and central figure of the Slayers franchise. Although still a teenager, she is a powerful and well-known sorceress with nicknames such as the "Bandit Killer" and "Black Witch". Born to a merchant family, she has a great love of money, treasure, and food. After meeting in the first novel, Gourry becomes Lina's constant companion and never leaves her for very long. Although the two appear to be in love with each other in anime, there is no romance between them.

Lina specializes in black magic, specifically attack magic that calls upon the power of demons. Her signature spell, Dragon Slave, comes from the power of the Dark Lord Shabranigdu, while Ragna Blade and her most powerful spell Giga Slave call upon the Lord of Nightmares. She is also a skilled swordsman, though not on the level of Gourry or Zelgadis, as she lacks physical strength. During the series, Lina and company face down and defeat many powerful demons, including two fragments of Shabranigdu, Hellmaster Fibrizo, and Dynast Graushera.

=== Gourry Gabriev ===
Voiced by: Yasunori Matsumoto (Japanese); Eric Stuart (TV series), Chris Patton (Slayers Premium) (English)

Gourry Gabriev (ガウリイ・ガブリエフ, Gaurī Gaburiefu) is a wandering swordsman who meets Lina at the beginning of the series and accompanies her from then on as a self-appointed bodyguard. Although chivalrous and a loyal friend, he is rather dumb and appears to have memory deficiencies. However, his skills as a swordsman are unmatched, especially when armed with his family's magic blade, the Sword of Light, also known as Gorun Nova. When Gourry is captured by Hellmaster Fibrizo in the eighth novel, the demon sends the Sword of Light back to its creator, Dark Star. In the tenth book, he begins using a sword taken from the collection of Lavas Nexalia Langmeier. When that seemingly breaks in the thirteenth novel, it is revealed to actually be the Blast Sword, a weapon known for its extreme sharpness. Gourry also has a high magic capacity and the potential to cast spells that rival Lina's power, but because of his faulty memory and disinterest, he cannot remember spells well enough to ever use them.

=== Zelgadis Graywords ===
Voiced by: Hikaru Midorikawa (Japanese); Daniel Cronin (Episodes 2–10), Crispin Freeman (Episodes 18-104, Premium) (English)

Zelgadis Graywords (ゼルガディス・グレイワーズ, Zerugadisu Gureiwāzu) is a sorcerer who Lina and Gourry meet in the first novel. As a retainer for his relative Rezo the Red Priest, Zelgadis and his colleagues fight Lina for the philosopher's stone. However, he is actually seeking the stone to make himself powerful enough to kill Rezo as revenge for turning him into a chimera. Although he asked Rezo to make him stronger, he did not know he would do so by fusing him with a rock golem and brow daemon. Zelgadis teams up with Lina and Gourry to destroy Rezo, and again two months later to defeat Rezo's copy when bounties are issued for the three. Sometime later, he runs into and works with them, plus Amelia, while attempting to acquire the manuscript of the Claire Bible in possession of the demon-worshiping cult, with the hope it will help him turn back into human. Searching for a way to regain his humanity, Zelgadis continues to travel with Lina and company out of convenience, not friendship. After the defeat of Hellmaster Fibrizo in the eighth novel, Zelgadis leaves Lina's group and continues his quest.

Zelgadis specializes in Shamanistic magic, which includes both elemental and astral magic, the latter of which deals with the astral, or spiritual, plane. Though he is not as learned in the art as Lina, Zelgadis' even combination of physical force and magical finesse render him among the most fearsome warriors. Due to his chimeric appearance, Zelgadis usually covers his head and face and often avoids human contact.

=== Sylphiel ===
Voiced by: Yumi Tōma (Japanese); Stacia Crawford (Episodes 18-26, 49-52), Stephanie Sheh (Episodes 90-93, 104) (English)

Sylphiel Nells Ruda (シルフィール・ネルス・ラーダ, Shirufīru Nerusu Rāda) is a shrine maiden and the daughter of the high priest of Sairaag. She knows Gourry from when he helped her father in a previous visit to the city, and has had a crush on him ever since. She is introduced in the third novel. By the time Sylphiel realizes that Rezo the Red Priest is somehow poisoning her father, he already has control over the people of Sairaag. She teams up with Zelgadis and, shortly after, with Lina, Gourry and Lantz. In the fight with Copy Rezo, Sylphiel's father and all of Sairaag are wiped off the planet. She then begins to live with her uncle in Saillune City in the fourth novel. In the eighth novel, she returns to the seemingly-restored Sairaag in order to save Gourry.

As a cleric, Sylphiel's skills in white magic (healing and protection) are impressive. Her defensive magic is powerful enough to easily hold its own against Copy Rezo. While her healing magic is able to bring Lina back from the brink of death using a high level resurrection spell. Although Sylphiel is weak in shamanism and black magic, she is able to cast Dragon Slave.

=== Amelia ===
Voiced by: Masami Suzuki (Japanese); Joan Baker (Episodes 11-13), Veronica Taylor (Episodes 14-104), Luci Christian (Slayers Premium) (English)

Amelia Wil Tesla Saillune (アメリア・ウィル・テスラ・セイルーン, Ameria Wiru Tesura Seirūn) is the youngest princess of the Holy Kingdom of Saillune, and its head shrine maiden. She is introduced in the fourth novel, where she joins Lina and Gourry on their travels after they stop her uncle and nephew's assassination attempts on her father, Phil Saillune. Amelia longs to be a "hero of justice" and quixotically pursues her quest for justice by following Lina and fighting those who appear to be villains. Her naïve tendency to believe whatever she is told sometimes leads her to mistake friend and foe. Although Amelia is around the same age as Lina, the latter is often annoyed with Amelia for her naïveté and her larger bust size, but eventually comes to accept her as a friend. After the eighth novel, Amelia leaves Lina and Gourry and returns to Saillune.

Amelia's perspective on good and evil evolves significantly as the series progresses. Most of her lessons in justice and heroism came from her father. After the murder of her mother, Amelia vowed never to use blades, though she once used the Sword of Light to channel the Ra-Tilt. Amelia is versed in the common clerical spells, and knows a bit of black and Shamanistic magic that she learned with her older sister, who may be Gracia, Naga the Serpent.

=== Xellos ===
Voiced by: Akira Ishida (Japanese); David Moo (Episodes 27-78), Michael Sinterniklaas (Episodes 83-104), Kurt Stoll (Slayers Premium) (English)

Xellos (ゼロス, Zerosu), known as Xellos the Priest, is a high-level demon who serves Greater Beast Zellas Metallium. He serves as her emissary and is extremely powerful; in the Incarnation War over 1,000 years ago, Xellos destroyed nearly all dragons by himself. Whereas Shabranigdu's four other demon lieutenants created both a priest and general to do their bidding, Zellas only created Xellos, thus he is twice as strong as the other demons' emissaries. Xellos is sometimes a hindrance, and sometimes a help to Lina and the other main characters. His actions appear frustratingly inconsistent because of his oft-changing loyalties at his master's request. His signature response to any important question that he does not want to answer is, "That is a secret!" (それは、秘密です, Sore wa, himitsu desu).

Xellos first appears in the fifth novel, where he is a mysterious priest that teams up with Lina and her friends so he can destroy the manuscript of the Claire Bible in possession of the demon-worshiping cult. In the next novel, Xellos reappears and starts to travel with Lina and company. He later admits to Lina that he is a demon serving Zellas and that he was originally tasked with destroying the Claire Bible manuscripts, but his current job was concocted by Hellmaster Fibrizo and is to protect and guide Lina to the Claire Bible. Knowing she can not defeat the strong demon, Lina accepts Xellos into the group. After successfully leading Lina to the Claire Bible at Dragons' Peak in the eighth novel, Xellos flees after being severely injured by Gaav. After Hellmaster Fibrizo is defeated in the next novel, Xellos appears in order to have Lina explain what happened. After she does, both say goodbye and wish to never meet again. Xellos briefly appears in the fifteenth novel, first stopping a demon attack on Lina and company led by Bradu, and then destroying Bradu when he was about to give secrets away to them.

=== Luke and Mileena ===
Luke (ルーク, Rūku) and Mileena (ミリーナ, Mirīna) are a pair of traveling mercenaries and treasure hunters who first appear in the ninth novel. Luke has black hair and an unfriendly face, while the beautiful Mileena has silver hair and a much more reserved personality. They have a friendly competition with Lina and Gourry for the magical sword in Bezeld, before teaming up with them to defeat the hyperdemon created by Sherra. Although Luke is cocky and often argues with Lina, he seems to have a crush on Mileena and will follow his partner's commands. Although he can also cast spells, Luke has a magical sword he fights with. When Luke casts a spell to enhance his sword with the power of Shabranigdu, Lina and Sherra both note how they have never heard of it before. Luke and Mileena reappear in the tenth novel as bodyguards hired by Lavas Nexalia Langmeier. However, they are secretly investigating whether or not Lavas' father, the lord of Solaria City, has been usurped. After learning Lavas is creating chimeras, they team up with Lina and Gourry to fight Lavas, who has turned himself into a demonoid. In the twelfth novel, Luke and Mileena have been hired by Jade Caudwell, a knight from the Kingdom of Dils, to investigate a mercenary who has quickly risen through the ranks and effectively controls the kingdom with the king's complete trust. They accepted after hearing her name is Sherra. They defeat the demon general with Lina and Gourry. Sticking with the duo, Luke and Mileena also help them defeat Dynast Graushera in the thirteenth novel.

In the fourteenth novel, Luke and Mileena are employed in Selentia City as bodyguards by Head Priest Ceres Laurencio during the struggle to see who will be the city's next high priest. Teaming up with Lina and Gourry, they are ambushed by mercenaries and assassins and Mileena is cut by a poisoned blade. When she dies, Luke loses control and seeks revenge; he dismembers the assassin who slashed her, kills Head Priest Francis Dmitri for hiring said assassin (despite him not having ordered the attack), and kills Head Priest Ryan Seinford for having turned them away when they sought medical attention for her at his temple. Each time, Lina and Gourry fail to stop him. Luke then heads for Ceres, because the medical care he gave Mileena was not enough to save her. After seeing the former comrades fight, Ceres willingly offers his life in order to stop the chaos, but Luke flees. In the fifteenth novel, Luke reveals himself to be the masked Shabranigdu who challenges Lina and Gourry to kill him. He explains that he willingly merged with the Shabranigdu fragment hidden inside him after being unable to get over Mileena's death and coming to hate the entire world; humans and demons alike. Luke plans to merge with the other Shabranigdu frozen in the Kataart Mountains, destroy the world, and then themselves. Lina destroys Luke/Shabranigdu by individually bursting and attacking with her four talismans that enhance magical capacity that she bought from Xellos, each representing one of the Dark Lords from the four worlds. The last one, representing Shabranigdu himself, only works because Luke wanted to die so he can see Mileena again.

=== Naga the Serpent ===
Voiced by: Maria Kawamura (Japanese); Kelly Manison (OVAs and films), Eva Kaminsky (Evolution-R) (English)

Naga the Serpent (白蛇(サーペント)のナーガ, Sāpento no Nāga), or Naga the White Serpent, is a powerful sorceress with an unstable but resilient personality. She does not appear in the main Slayers novels, but instead is a main character in the Slayers Special and Slayers Smash spin-off prequel novels. She is obsessed with Lina, and follows the younger sorceress around for some time, annoying Lina with her characteristic cackling laugh.

Naga's main spells, such as Freeze Arrow, are water- and ice-based, in direct opposition to Lina's fire-based skills. She has also shown the ability to use powerful shamanistic, white magic, and necromancy spells. Her true name is Gracia Ul Naga Saillune; she is Prince Phil's daughter and Amelia's older sister. Naga left home after her mother was murdered.

Naga appears in the OVAs and films, and makes a cameo appearance in Slayers Evolution-R as "Nama", a sentient suit of armor who remembers very little about her life before her soul was placed in the living armor. Her identity is never confirmed, but Nama's familiar laugh gives Lina chills.

=== Martina ===
Voiced by: Tomoko Ishimura (Japanese); Rachael Lillis (English)

Martina Xoana Mel Navratilova (マルチナ・ゾアナ・メル・ナブラチロワ, Maruchina Zoana Meru Naburachirowa) is an anime-original character who appears exclusively in Slayers Next. She is the princess of the kingdom of Zoana and has green hair styled in drills. She specializes in curses through the power of Lord Zoamelgustar, a fictional monster that she worships; surprisingly, her curses actually work, even though Zoamelgustar does not exist. At the beginning of the series, she and her father plot to capture Amelia, but Lina saves Amelia and then casts a Dragon Slave to destroy Martina's castle, She then runs off and learns magic so that she can take revenge. She later joins Lina and the gang on their adventures. When Hellmaster Fibrizo kills her during the final battle, Martina uses her last moments to encourage Lina to keep fighting and save Gourry. Martina is fickle in her love affairs, obsessed with whatever man she happens to see first on any given day. At first she is hung up on Zelgadis, but her interests switch to Gourry and even Xellos as the series progresses, before settling on Zangulus. She eventually marries Zangulus. Lina and the gang remark that Martina is the comic relief character in their party.

=== Filia ===
Voiced by: Houko Kuwashima (Japanese); Tara Jayne (English)

Filia Ul Copt (フィリア・ウル・コプト, Firia Uru Koputo) is an anime-original character who appears exclusively in Slayers TRY. She is a priestess of the Fire Dragon King. As a Golden Dragon, she has a pronounced sense of honor and is dedicated to "fulfilling her duties to the temple". Any monster that crosses her path annoys her, and she doesn't get along with Xellos at all. She carries a large mace (affectionately dubbed "Mace-sama") in her garter, and uses it to end most of her arguments.

Filia's Golden Dragon magic from the outer world is a raw, more intense form of white magic. Amelia states that the white magic used by clerics is only an "empty shell" of Filia's ancient holy magic. Filia's skills include clairvoyance, healing, purification, transportation, and offensive spells effective against the most powerful monster. Her spell Chaotic Disintegrate is an astral offensive spell that outclasses the Ra-Tilt. Filia is able to switch back and forth with ease between her dragon and human forms. Her dragon's form comically wears a pink bow on the end of her tail. While in dragon form, Filia can fly, surpassing the speed of a normal Ray Wing levitation spell. Her Laser Breath, which fires an incredibly destructive beam from a dragon's mouth, can be used in both human and dragon forms.

Filia originally wanted Lina's big sister Luna to accompany her on her quest, but Luna refuses and suggests Lina as a replacement. At the end of Slayers TRY, Filia accepts the egg of the reborn Valgaav in repentance for what her ancestors did to his kind, and raises him as his adoptive mother.

=== Pokota ===
Voiced by: Yumiko Kobayashi (Japanese); Colleen O'Shaughnessey (English)

Pokota (ポコタ), full name Posel Korba Taforashia (ポセル=コルバ=タフォーラシア, Poseru Koruba Tafōrashia), is an anime-original character created for Slayers Revolution and Slayers Evolution-R, though he borrows certain elements from the character Luke seen in the novels. He resembles a small stuffed animal rabbit with large ears that double as a set of functional arms used for casting spells, wielding swords, or gliding through the air. Like Lina, he is a powerful sorcerer capable of casting various spells, including the Dragon Slave. He wields a replica of the Sword of Light, which he carries in a pocket in his chest.

Pokota was born a human, the prince of Taforashia. When he was a teenager, the Durum sickness swept through Taforashia, and the king became very ill. Rezo the Red Priest appeared and sealed the residents of Taforashia in sleeping chambers to isolate them until a cure was found. In this way he sealed Pokota's human body, but he used the magical Hellmaster's Jar to transfer Pokota's spirit into his current form. Years later, Pokota is searching for Rezo in order to find a way to revive his people.

== Villains ==
=== Rezo the Red Priest ===
Voiced by: Takehito Koyasu (Japanese); Peter Davis (Episodes 3-10, 23), Liam O'Brien (Episodes 88-104) (English)

Rezo the Red Priest (赤法師レゾ, Aka Hōshi Rezo) is the main antagonist of the first novel. He is a world-famous cleric and healer who travels the world performing miracles. Considered one of the "Five Great Sages", he has mastered not only clerical white magic, but shamanistic and black magic as well. Rezo is over a century old, but does not look his age; as Lina describes him as looking "both young and old" at the same time. He was born blind and is always clad in red. Rezo is the only-known relative of Zelgadis, who assumes he is either his grandfather or great-grandfather.

Although he travels the land healing the sick and blind, Rezo is unable to cure his own blindness. So he seeks the philosopher's stone hoping it will boost his power enough to accomplish his wish to actually see the world. However, upon attaining and swallowing the philosopher's stone, Rezo is revealed to have been taken over by the Dark Lord Shabranigdu from inside. Lina is able to defeat the Dark Lord using the incomplete Giga Slave and the Sword of Light, with help from Rezo's soul, but the priest dies in the process.

In the anime, it is later revealed that Rezo survived by transferring his soul, as well as the ghost of Shabranigdu, into the Hellmaster's Jar. Pokota resurrects Rezo in order to revive the people of Taforashia from their suspended state. After reviving the people of Taforashia, Rezo wants to see again, if only for a moment, so he opens his eyes. As the power of Shabranigdu returns to him, he asks Lina to destroy him once more. With the help of the completed Giga Slave, Lina destroys Rezo, and the ghost of Shabranigdu with him.

=== Halciform the White ===
Halciform the White (白のハルシフォム, Shiro no Harushifomu) is the main antagonist of the second novel. He is a sorcerer and chairman of Atlas City's sorcerers' council. Missing for six months by the time Lina and Gourry arrive in the city, a succession battle between vice chairmen Talim the Purple and Daymia the Blue is occurring. Lina and Gourry find Halciform sealed away in Daymia's house and free him. Unknown to them, Halciform was kidnapping and experimenting on townspeople to obtain immortality. Because he has obtained quasi-immortality by making a contract with Seigram and sealing his soul in a pledge stone, Talim recruited Daymia to seal Halciform away. Now freed, Halciform has Seigram curse Daymia and kills Talim. Lina and Gourry succeed in breaking Halciform's pledge stone and force Seigram to flee. Halciform, who also extended his life by consuming the demon Gio Gaia, is finally killed when Rubia (ルビア), the homunculus he created of the dead woman he loves, uses the Sword of Light on him. Rubia briefly appears in the fifteenth novel, when Lina and company stop in Atlas City.

=== Seigram ===
Voiced by: Yōsuke Akimoto (Japanese); Robert O'Gorman (English)

Seigram (セイグラム, Seiguramu), known as Seigram the Faceless, is a masked demon working for Halciform in the second novel. He confronts Lina and Gourry several times, including leading enemies to fight them, but never engages in battle himself. This is revealed to be due to Halciform making a contract with him, which required Halciform to seal his own soul in a pledge stone that the demon wears as his mask. The risk of the mask breaking and the fact that Halciform will die if Seigram does, is why Halciform has the demon refrain from battle. After Lina and Gourry succeed in breaking the pledge stone and seriously injuring Seigram, the demon flees. He returns in the sixth novel seeking revenge on Lina and Gourry. Still weak from his injuries, Seigram fused with the human Zuma, who also has a grudge on Lina. Seigram/Zuma is killed by Lina's Ragna Blade.

In Slayers NEXT, Seigram is a servant of Gaav the Demon Dragon King and seemingly as powerful as his rival Xellos. He first appears as a mysterious figure that frames Damia and Tarimu by summoning ooze monsters out of their estates, and he makes an alliance with Halcyform. He later attacks Lina in the temple of the Claire Bible manuscript, revealing that he was granted enough of Gaav's power to withstand a Dragon Slave. He is killed when Xellos holds him directly in the path of Lina's Ragna Blade.

=== Eris ===
Voiced by: Etsuko Ishikawa (Japanese); Rachel Nanstad (English)

Eris (エリス, Erisu) is a young woman in the third novel who first appears as a novice bounty hunter chasing Zelgadis in Sairaag after Rezo the Red Priest put a bounty on him. Due to her lack of strength, the heroes agree to bring her along with them for her safety. However, Lina eventually deduces that Eris is the real Vrumugun; a sorcerer who confronted the heroes several times previously, despite easily being killed each time. These Vrumuguns were copies she created and controlled. With her full name Erisiel Vrumugun (エリシエル=ヴルムグン, Erishieru Vurumugun), she was Rezo's assistant, helping him perform experiments to cure his blindness. Having been in love with Rezo, Eris wants revenge and to make a name for herself, so she has been controlling the homunculus copy that Rezo made of himself and placed very large bounties for the capture of Lina, Gourry and Zelgadis. However, when the copy reveals itself to be self-aware, it kills Eris in revenge for experimenting on it alongside Rezo.

In the anime, Vrumugun is partnered with Zangulus, and they try to capture Lina and Gourry. However, while Zangulus is short-tempered and arrogant, Vrumugun is quiet, collected, and takes everything seriously. Eris is killed in cold blood by Copy Rezo after he merges with the ancient Demon Beast Zanaffar that was buried in the Holy Tree Flagoon.

=== Copy Rezo ===
Voiced by: Takehito Koyasu (Japanese); Peter Davis (English)

Copy Rezo (コピー・レゾ, Kopī Rezo) is the main antagonist of the third novel. He is a homunculus copy of Rezo the Red Priest, created by the original Rezo as a lab rat for experiments to cure his blindness. Although Copy Rezo's sight is cured, the real Rezo is unable to make it work on himself, leading to even more experiments on the copy. It was after being fused with a demon, that Copy Rezo gained self-awareness, causing it to seek revenge on the original Rezo. But with the real Rezo dead, the copy must settle for proving his superiority by killing those who did. It pretended to allow Eris to control it in taking over Sairaag and placing the bounties on Lina, Gourry and Zelgadis. Copy Rezo is finally killed when Lina pins him to the Flagoon tree with the Bless Blade, and the tree feeds off his evil energy.

In the anime, Copy Rezo orders Eris to lure the three of them to Sairaag, where he attempts to defeat them by resurrecting and absorbing the power of the demon beast Zanaffar. However, Lina, Gourry, and Zelgadis, accompanied by Amelia and Sylphiel, kill him using the Blessed Blade and the power of the tree Flaggoon.

=== Kanzel ===
Kanzel (カンジェル, Kanjeru) is an antagonist in the fourth novel. He first appears to be a strong sorcerer working with Chris Saillune to assassinate his brother Phil. He is handsome, but has a scar on his right cheek and an icy stare. However, every time Kanzel attacks, he seems to be focused on killing Lina instead. Kanzel's actual partner, Alfred, eventually breaks ties with him because of his repeated deviations from their plan. Kanzel reveals himself to be a mid-ranked demon who teamed up with the Saillunes just so he could come into contact with Lina, whom he was ordered to kill with minimal human casualties; later revealed in the series to have been the orders of Gaav. Kanzel is killed by Gourry's Sword of Light that was enhanced with Dragon Slave by Lina, and with help from Amelia.

=== Zuma ===
Voiced by: Nobuo Tobita (Japanese); Troy Baker (English)

Zuma (ズーマ, Zūma) is a magic-wielding assassin who first appears in the fourth novel when he is hired by Kanzel to kill Lina. He has a reputation as the best in his line of work, with Lina being the only person to ever survive one of his attacks. Zuma continues to make attempts on Lina's life out of honor. Gourry uses the Sword of Light to cut off Zuma's right arm, while Lina turns his left hand to ash with a spell. Zuma returns in the sixth novel, still seeking to fulfill the contract to kill Lina and a new contract on the merchant Laddock Lanzard (ラドック=ランザード, Radokku Ranzādo), who hires Lina to protect him. Zuma has now fused with the demon Seigram, this being why he has both arms again; later revealed in the series to have been done by Raltark. Zuma is also revealed to be the alter ego of Laddock. Zuma/Laddock/Seigram is killed by Lina's Ragna Blade, when his human heart causes him to hesitate after meeting eyes with his son.

In Slayers Evolution-R, Lina once killed a group of bandits that were responsible for killing Zuma's wife, thus denying him vengeance. He has his hands slashed off a second time before Xellos appears and kills him in order to steal the Hellmaster's Jar.

=== Demon-worshiping cult ===
An unnamed "demon-worshiping cult" (魔王崇拝教団, maō sūhai kyōdan) is the antagonist group of the fifth novel. Based near the village of Mayin, they worship Shabranigdu and his five lieutenants; Chaos Dragon, Deep Sea, Dynast, Greater Beast, and Hellmaster. Using a manuscript of the Claire Bible, they resurrect Zanaffar (ザナッファー, Zanaffā), the beast who destroyed Sairaag 120 years ago, with the goal of attacking Saillune, but are stopped by the main characters. The cult is led by Klotz (クロツ, Kurotsu), who is ultimately killed by Zanaffar, and has many werebeasts as loyal members; most were dying mercenaries saved by being turned into chimeras. Second-in-command is Balgumon (バルグモン, Barugumon), a skilled swordsman killed by Xellos. The humpbacked werebeast Vedul (ヴェドゥル, Veduru) fights together with Gilfa (ギルファ, Girufa), who controls shadows and is heard, but never seen. When they are killed by Zelgadis, it is revealed that Gilfa's brain and mouth were transplanted into Vedul's hump. Battle axe-wielding Duclis (デュクリス, Dukurisu), whom Lina speculates is a fusion between human and white tiger, wears an incomplete Zanaffar as anti-magic armor, but is killed by Gourry's Sword of Light. But it is another cultist who is consumed by a living Zanaffar armor for it to achieve its complete form; a silver, dragon-sized, wolf-like beast with whip-like tentacles. Lina kills Zanaffar by using her new spell Ragna Blade, which summons and channels darkness into a blade, to create a hole in its body that she then casts Fireball into.

=== Gaav ===
Voiced by: Jouji Nakata (Japanese); Jay Snyder (English)

Chaos Dragon Gaav (魔竜王(カオスドラゴン)ガーヴ, Kaosu Doragun Gāvu) is one of the five demon lieutenants created by Shabranigdu who first appears in the seventh novel. Gaav's priest is Raltark (ラルターク, Rarutāku) and his general is Rashart (ラーシャート, Rāshāto). During the Incarnation War over 1,000 years ago, he fought Aqualord alongside Shabranigdu, but "died" striking the final blow. Although demons normally do not "die", their power is temporarily sealed and will recoup over time, Aqualord placed an imperfect seal on Gaav that caused him to be reincarnated into a human body. After countless reincarnations, Gaav has regained his memories and power, but his spirit has merged with his human host's. This causes him to oppose Shabranigdu and the other lieutenants; if Shabranigdu is revived, the human-bodied Gaav will be destroyed along with the rest of the world.

Despite not knowing the details of Hellmaster's plan involving Lina, Gaav orders his subordinates to kill Lina; including Kanzel and Raltark, the latter of whom first appears in the sixth novel as Laddock Lanzard's butler. Under Gaav's orders, Rashart becomes the head of the royal guard in the Kingdom of Dils and is tasked with forging an alliance with the dragons and elves, but the plan is foiled by Xellos. On Dragons' Peak, Raltark is killed by Xellos and Lina, which sees Rashart fetch Gaav. After seriously wounding Xellos, causing him to flee, Gaav fights Lina and company. But he is easily defeated by Hellmaster Fibrizo at the beginning of the eighth novel. Rashart continues to attack Lina and company, claiming to seek revenge for Gaav. However, it is eventually revealed that he is now working for Fibrizo, before being killed by Lina.

=== Hellmaster Fibrizo ===
Voiced by: Kazue Ikura (Japanese); Wayne Grayson (English)

Hellmaster Fibrizo (冥王(ヘルマスター)フィブリゾ, Herumasutā Fiburizo) is the most powerful of the five demon lieutenants created by Shabranigdu. It was Fibrizo who ignited the Incarnation War over 1,000 years ago when he awakened the part of Shabranigdu sealed within the sorcerer Lei Magnus. During the war, Shabranigdu posted Hellmaster to the Desert of Destruction as part of the seal to destroy Aqualord. According to Xellos, most of Hellmaster's servants were destroyed in the war, this being why Xellos is tasked with carrying out his plan of protecting and escorting Lina to the Claire Bible. Hellmaster is most likely the second-in-command of the demon race, and like all demons, he seeks to destroy the world and return everything to chaos. He manifests as an androgynous young boy in order to trick his victims into underestimating him.

Although Fibrizo first appears in the seventh novel as a child of Gyria City who sets Lina onto Gaav's plans, his identity is not revealed until the next novel, where he easily kills Gaav and kidnaps Gourry to Sairaag. Fibrizo plans to force Lina to draw upon the power of the Lord of Nightmares by using the Giga Slave spell, which she has now perfected after interacting with the Claire Bible as he intended. He hopes she will be unable to control the spell and it will destroy the entire world. Fibrizo kidnaps Gourry and takes him to Sairaag, which he has reconstructed out of the lingering thoughts of the dead and his own being. He eventually succeeds in forcing Lina to cast Giga Slave to save her friends. However, the Giga Slave summons the Lord of Nightmares itself using Lina's body as a vessel. Fibrizo mistakenly thinks Lina has retained control over the spell and attacks her from inside herself by exploding her heart; as everything in the new Sairaag is Fibrizo, part of him entered her body as the food she ate. But Lina appears fine and the Lord of Nightmares obliterates Fibrizo for his transgression of attacking it.

=== Sherra ===
Sherra (シェーラ, Shēra) first appears in the ninth novel as a young girl who knows the location of a rumored magical sword located in the town of Bezeld. To Lina, Gourry, Luke and Mileena, she seems to be the target of a group of men dressed in black that they suspect are also after the sword. However, she is eventually revealed to be a high-level demon and the general of Dynast Graushera. Sherra turns a man into a dragon-sized mass of flesh with leg-like appendages after he grips the black sword, which is itself a demon she created named Dulgoffa (ドゥールゴーフ, Dūrugōfu), and has it attack Bezeld. This "hyperdemon" mass has ten spider-like legs, tentacles to suck the life force out of people, and extremely fast regenerative abilities, making any attacks against it useless. Lina realizes that it is a combination of a demonic curse and a human possessed by a demon, thus the only way to destroy it is to kill the demon who cast the curse. She also correctly suspects that the demon who cast the curse is the same one doing the possessing; the sword itself, which is fused into the mass. Lina and Luke destroy the hyperdemon by simultaneously using Ragna Blade and Rube-Eye Blade on the tentacle which houses the core of the fused demon. Sherra recovers her black sword, but Lina tricks the demon into withdrawing for now. In the eleventh novel, it is learned that Sherra had given Dulgoffa to Bell. In contrast to the unwilling victim of the ninth novel, Bell willingly fuses with Dulgoffa and therefore appears as herself, but entirely black. Sherra reappears as the main antagonist of the twelfth novel. Posing as a mercenary, she quickly rose through the ranks in the Kingdom of Dils and effectively controls it with the king's complete trust. It is learned that she temporarily possessed the human nobles and officials who opposed her plans with Dulgoffa just long enough to weaken their wills, so they could then be possessed by low-ranking demons from the astral plane. Lina, Gourry, Luke and Mileena defeat Sherra together. In the fifteenth novel, it is revealed that Sherra's smile at death was because she identified Luke as a host of Shabranigdu when he grabbed Dulgoffa and was not consumed and passed this information on to Dynast.

=== Lavas Nexalia Langmeier ===
Lavas Nexalia Langmeier (ラーヴァス=ネクサリア=ラングマイヤー, Rāvasu Nekusaria Rangumaiyā) is the regent of Solaria City and the main antagonist of the tenth novel. He holds the position due to his father, Klein, being ill. Lavas claims his older brother Veisam is plotting a rebellion and is the person behind the chimera factory that Lina and Gourry find, but suspiciously, the citizens of Solaria were unaware of Lavas' existence until recently. Lavas, who is really Belgis (ベルギス, Berugisu), the former king of Ruvinagald, is revealed to be the one behind everything and to be working with the men in black, whom Lina and company previously fought in the ninth novel. Before Slayers began, Lina was part of exposing the Ruvinagald monarchy for conducting human experiments by forcing people, including children, into becoming hosts for demons. Lord Klein, a distant relative, offered Belgis asylum, before Belgis started poisoning him, took control of Solaria, and experimented on Veisam. Lina, Gourry, Luke, Mileena and Wizer Freion, a Ruvinagald inspector chasing Belgis, storm the castle. After quickly defeating a half-demon Veisam, they fight Lavas, who has turned himself into a demonoid and wears magical clothing and accessories, making him stronger than most pure demons. Lavas is killed by Lina's Ragna Blade.

=== Bell ===
Bell (ベル, Beru) is first introduced in the eleventh novel as the reason Aria Ashford (アリア=アシュフォード, Aria Ashufōdo) recruits Lina and Gourry to stop the insurrection in Crimson Town. After her fiancé died, Bell married Kailus (カイラス), head of the local sorcerers' council, and sent her younger sister, Aria, to warn of an insurrection her new husband was planning. After the insurrection takes place, Aria asks Lina and Gourry to help save her sister. However, after they kill Kailus, Bell reveals she was behind everything. After learning that Kailus had killed her fiancé, she was forced to marry him when he threatened Aria's life. Bell was given the demon sword Dulgoffa by Sherra and used her new powers to turn the members of Crimson Town's sorcerers' council into chimeras and start the insurrection in Kailus' name as revenge. These chimera include Zonagein (ゾナゲイン), an old man who creates many lesser and brass demons, and can also grow spider-like legs from his back to move at high speed; Aileus (アイレウス, Aireusu), a bizarre plant-like chimera with strong regenerative abilities, who dies with Kailus' death; and Elydia Mycale (エリディア=ミュカレ, Eridia Myukare), a young woman with an emerald appearance that can reflect back magic she is hit with and who is absorbed by Kailus. With her goal complete, Bell, who is now fully fused with Dulgoffa, wants to kill Aria and herself. But Aria sacrifices her life in order to give Lina the opening to kill Bell with her Ragna Blade.

=== Dynast Graushera ===
Dynast Graushera (覇王(ダイナスト)グラウシェラー, Dainasuto Gurausherā) is one of the five demon lieutenants created by Shabranigdu. Suspecting Dynast is plotting another Incarnation War, Milgazia and Memphys team up with Lina and company in the thirteenth novel and investigate Gyria City, where the latter defeated Dynast's general Sherra in the previous book for seemingly gaining a controlling influence over the king. After entering the castle and defeating several demons, including Sardian (サーディアン, Sādian), the king's trade minister, and Farial (ファリアール, Fariāru), the king's sorcerer, Lina deduces that Dynast Graushera has been masquerading as King Wells Xeno Gyria this whole time. The heroes work together to defeat the demon lieutenant by having Memphys' Zanafa armor attach itself to him, sealing him off from the astral plane and his real body, and taking turns attacking, allowing Lina an opening to deal the final blow with her Ragna Blade. Although they succeed in destroying his corporal form, Dynast's real body still exists, but Milgazia doubts he will show his weakened state to humans. In the fifteenth novel, it is revealed that Graushera was copying what Fibrizo had done 1,000 years prior; cause war and destruction in order to find and awaken a fragment of Shabranigdu hidden in someone's soul. Sherra had successfully identified Luke as the host and passed this on to Dynast before dying.

=== Bradu ===
Bradu (ブラドゥ, Buradu) is a demon who combats Lina, Gourry, Milgazia and Memphys several times in the fifteenth novel. He appears as a tall young man with blond hair. He summons lower-level demons such as Gwon (グオン, Guon), a pulsing green brain mounted on dozens of spider legs, and Vaidaz (ヴァイダアヅ, Vuaidaadzu), a bunch of bones mounted into a vaguely humanoid shape with green fluid leaking at the seams. He also seems to summon nameless demons that look like dead trees in human form, which reconstitute themselves when damaged and replicate from any severed pieces. Some of Bradu's attacks on Lina and company are stopped by a demon resembling a skinless human with eyestalks in place of eyes, who kills Gwon before being killed himself by a dead tree, and others by Xellos. Lina deduces that the dead tree demons are actually separate extensions of Bradhu himself. As Lina and company are about to kill him, Bradu offers to inform them why they are being lured to Sairaag. But Xellos quickly attacks and kills him before he can divulge the information. The demon-on-demon attacks are a result of some of the demons following the orders of the Shabranigdu in Luke, and others listening to the Shabranigdu frozen in the Kataart Mountains.

=== Valgaav ===
Voiced by: Wataru Takagi (Japanese); Scottie Ray (English)

Valgaav (ヴァルガーヴ, Varugāvu) is one of the main adversaries in the Slayers TRY anime. Once known as Prince Val of the Ancient Dragon clan, he is nearly killed by the Golden Dragons, who feared the dark powers of the Ancient Dragons and exterminated them. He is saved at the last moment by Gaav, who sees in him a powerful ally and a spirit of hatred towards the Golden Dragons for their betrayal. Gaav bestows upon him the powers of a monster and renames him "Valgaav".

Valgaav and Gaav are separated when the other four Demon Lords create the barrier separating the outer and inner worlds. The barrier remains in effect until Hellmaster Fibrizo's death at the end of Slayers NEXT. Valgaav is loyal only to his savior, Gaav, and gives no allegiance to any side, be it Slayers, dragons, gods, or monsters. With the combined power of a monster and Ancient Dragon, Valgaav is the strongest of Gaav's servants. However, he is notably weaker than Gaav. His Ancient Dragon power conflicts with the monster power given to him by Gaav, causing him pain. He is able to best Xellos in a one-on-one fight by using Ragud Mezagis, one of the five Dark Star weapons. He survives a magically amplified Dragon Slave fired directly into his body.

Despite his prowess as a warrior, Valgaav is radically unstable and reckless. He activates the gateway created to summon Dark Star with only two of the five weapons required. Although the gateway is closed by other gods from the Overworld, Dark Star fires a blast through it that destroys Valgaav. He reappears at the end of the season merged with the fusion of Dark Star and Volphied, and acts as an arbiter of the two. Possessing the powers of both dragon gods and monster lords, he is easily the most powerful being faced in the entire storyline of Slayers, although his power is cut in half by the open gateway. Valgaav/Dark Star/Volphied is destroyed by the combination of dark and light powers of Xellos's and Filia's abilities, combined with the five Dark Star weapons and Lina's incantation of Chaos power. At the end of Slayers TRY, he is reborn as an egg and falls under the care of Filia and two of his former demi-human subordinates, Jillas and Gravos.

== Other characters ==
=== Zolf ===
Voiced by: Masato Hirano (Japanese); Stan Hart (English)

Zolf (ゾルフ, Zorufu) is a sorcerer loyal to Zelgadis in the first novel. While under the command of Zelgadis and Rezo, Zolf infiltrated a group of bandits in order to steal a statue containing the philosopher's stone. But he was injured when Lina robbed the gang and, with bandages covering his entire body, she refers to him as a "mummy" as he pursues her leading a group of trolls. After Zelgadis' break with Rezo, Zolf chooses to follow Zelgadis and remain under his command, also removing his bandages. He casts a Dragon Slave at Ruby-Eye Shabranigdu, but it is reflected back, killing Zolf and his comrade Rodimus (ロディマス, Rodimasu).

=== Dilgear ===
Voiced by: Hirohiko Kakegawa (Japanese); Jimmy Zoppi (English)

Dilgear (ディルギア, Dirugia) is a half-wolf, half-troll henchman of Rezo in the first novel; referred to by Lina as a "werewolf" for lack of a more accurate term. He has a lupine face and humanoid body, and fights with a large scimitar. Although Dilgear was placed under Zelgadis' command, when Zelgadis defects and frees Lina, Dilgear attacks them both with a large group of trolls. He ends up retreating, but attacks again the following day with a larger and more varied group, including the demon sorcerer Zolom, the latter of whom is defeated by the arriving Gourry. When Zolf and Rodimus also arrive, Dilgear thinks that he has been saved, but their loyalty is to Zelgadis, not Rezo, and the werewolf is quickly defeated by Rodimus. Two months later, after Copy Rezo places bounties on Lina and Gourry in the third novel, Dilgear is revealed to have survived and attacks the two under the command of Vrumugun, but is quickly defeated by Lina's Fireball.

In the anime, Dilgear is seriously wounded by Zolf but is revived by his half-troll regenerative abilities. However, instead of seeking revenge he ends up as Luna Inverse's pet "Spot". The exact circumstances of this radical change in Dilgear's life are unknown. In the manga, Dilgear is a bounty hunter sent by Eris, along with Rahannim and Vrumugun, to eliminate Gourry and Lina.

=== Lantz ===
Lantz (ランツ, Rantsu) is a bastard sword-wielding mercenary working for Talim the Purple in Atlas City during the second novel. He is lecherous and has red hair. Although a first-rate swordsman, he is not on the level of Gourry, whom he greatly respects after seeing his skills. When he sees the cursed mass that Daymia was turned into and learns that they are fighting demons, Lantz flees back to Talim's house where he is seriously injured by his former colleague Rod (ロッド, Roddo), who has switched allegiance to Halciform simply so that he can duel Gourry. Lantz' life is saved thanks to Lina performing healing magic on him. About a month later, Lantz, now with a beard, joins Lina and Gourry in their fight against the clone of Rezo the Red Priest in the third novel. Not being able to fight demons as effectively as his comrades, Sylphiel gives him the Bless Blade, which purifies and amplifies his will, allowing him to damage demons. Lantz successfully uses it to defeat the demon Vizea.

=== Talim the Purple and Daymia the Blue ===
Talim the Purple (紫のタリム, Murasaki no Tarimu) and Daymia the Blue (青のデイミア, Ao no Deimia) are the vice chairmen of Atlas City's sorcerers' council in the second novel. They have been competing for the position of chairmen since Halciform's disappearance. Talim is a fat bald man who loves eating and smoking cigars. Talim hires Lina and Gourry to work as bodyguards alongside Lantz and Rod and protect him until the election. Daymia is the balding and bearded son of a noble family, and is considered crazy by both Talim and Halciform. According to Talim, Daymia claims to be researching immortality by experimenting with homunculi and chimera, which Lina and Gourry end up fighting. But unknown to Lina and Gourry, Talim had learned that Halciform was kidnapping and experimenting on townspeople to obtain immortality. Because Halciform had obtained quasi-immortality by making a contract with Seigram, Talim recruited Daymia, who previously aided Halciform in his research until they had a falling out, to seal him away. When unwittingly freed by Lina and Gourry, Halciform has Seigram curse Daymia into an immortal mass of flesh and decapitates Talim, whose head he keeps alive in a tank until killing him as collateral damage in an attack on Lina.

=== Phil Saillune ===
Voiced by: Masahiro Anzai(Season 1 and 2), Minoru Inaba (All subsequent appearances) (Japanese); Matt Black (Episodes 11-13), Jimmy Zoppi (Episodes 25-26, 34-40, 53), David Brimmer (Episodes 90-91) (English)

Philionel El Di Saillune (フィリオネル=エル=ディ=セイルーン, Firioneru Eru Di Seirūn) is the crown prince of the Holy Kingdom of Saillune and father of Amelia. He first appears in the fourth novel. Phil is the eldest son of King Eldran Saillune, older brother of Christopher Wil Brogg Saillune, and uncle of Alfred. With their father old and bedridden, Chris attempts to become king by ordering assassination attempts on Phil, who is first in the line of succession. With help from Lina and Gourry, it is revealed that, while Chris went along with the plan, it is his son Alfred who is chiefly behind the assassinations. After being captured by Amelia, Alfred is killed by Chris when he attempts to attack Phil.

Before the events of Slayers, Lina had helped Phil when he was the target of other assassination attempts. The culprit was Randionne, Phil and Chris' younger brother, who was killed in the incident by someone other than Lina. Also before the series, Phil's eldest daughter, Gracia Ul Naga Saillune, set out on a sojourn after his wife was killed, and now calls herself "Naga the White Serpent". Possibly due to his wife's death and Gracia's absence, Phil is very close with and protective of his youngest daughter Amelia. Like Amelia, her father has a strong belief in justice, and he is also a pacifist. However, if Phil sees something he believes to be unjust, he will not hesitate to use force. Unlike most of the Saillune royal family, Phil has no magical powers, but his brute strength is sufficient to destroy lesser demons.

=== Zellas Metallium ===
Greater Beast Zellas Metallium (獣王(グレーター・ビースト)ゼラス=メタリオム, Gurētā Bīsuto Zerasu Metariomu) is one of the five demon lieutenants created by Shabranigdu. Xellos serves as her right-hand man, and everything Xellos does in the end leads back to her. Whereas Shabranigdu's four other demon lieutenants created both a priest and general to do their bidding, Zellas only created Xellos, thus he is twice as strong as the other demon emissaries. During the Incarnation War, Shabranigdu posted Zellas to Wolfpack Isle as part of the seal to destroy Aqualord. Greater Beast briefly appears in the fifteenth novel alongside her fellow demon lieutenant Deep Sea Dolphin. They separate Lina and Gourry from Milgazia and Memphys by sending the former two to another world to fight Luke/Shabranigdu.

=== Milgazia ===
Voiced by: Masaaki Ōkura (Japanese); Zeke Zeigler (English)

Milgazia (ミルガズィア, Mirugazia) is the elder golden dragon at Dragons' Peak, a settlement of golden and black dragons who protect a door to the Claire Bible. First appearing in the seventh novel, he is over 1,000 years old and previously met Xellos as an enemy during the Incarnation War. After taking on a human form, he guides Lina to the Claire Bible, out of fear of Xellos, where she learns the truth behind the Giga Slave spell. Milgazia saves Lina when Raltark appears, and later heals Amelia when she is seriously injured. Milgazia reappears at the end of the twelfth novel with the elf Memphys. He informs Lina and company that he suspects Dynast Graushera is plotting another Incarnation War. Milgazia and Memphys join their party in the following book, where they help defeat Dynast Graushera. The duo team up with Lina and Gourry again in the fifteenth novel. But the two teams are separated upon reaching Sairaag, as Lina and Gourry are sent to another world to fight Ruby-Eye Shabranigdu. At the end of the book, Milgazia and Memphys set off to kill any remaining demons.

=== Memphys Rhinesword ===
Memphys Rhinesword (メンフィス=ラインソード, Menfisu Rainsōdo), nicknamed "Mephy" (メフィ, Mefi), is a beautiful elf with long blonde hair. Despite having the appearance of a twenty-year-old, Lina guesstimates she is actually a century old. As an elf, Memphys possesses much more powerful magic than humans. Her white plate armor is actually Zenafa Armor, a semi-living armor co-created by elves and dragons to combat demons following the Incarnation War. It allows her to control her connection to the astral plane and can change shape at will. It is a correctly made version of the Zanaffar anti-magic armor Lina previously fought; Memphys suspects that failure, and its different pronunciation and spelling, is due to humans' inferior magical abilities. Although first appearing with Milgazia at the very end of the twelfth novel, Memphys is properly introduced in the subsequent book. She and her family have known Milgazia since childhood, and she refers to him as her "uncle". Memphys shows disdain for humans and initially butts heads with Lina, until the two warm up to each other after defeating Dynast Graushera together. She used to be a timid and shy person, but an encounter with a human sorceress (implied to be Naga the Serpent) inspired her now-domineering personality. Memphys and Milgazia team up with Lina and Gourry again in the fifteenth novel. But the two teams are separated upon reaching Sairaag, as Lina and Gourry are sent to another world to fight Ruby-Eye Shabranigdu. At the end of the book, the elf and dragon duo set off to kill any remaining demons.

=== Zangulus ===
Voiced by: Bin Shimada (Japanese); Liam O'Malley (Episode 13), Ted Lewis (Episodes 14-21, 49-52) (English)

Zangulus (ザングルス, Zangurusu) is an anime-only character. He is a mercenary and swordsman of considerable skill. Although he cannot use magic, he wields a weapon called the Howling Sword, a magical sword created by Rezo that can shoot great gusts of wind. Zangulus and the sorcerer Vrumugun were originally hired as bounty hunters by Eris and Copy Rezo to capture Lina, Gourry, and Zelgadis and bring them to Sairaag.

Zangulus becomes obsessed with fighting Gourry to see who is the better swordsman. They duel in Rezo's lab, but Gourry wins in the end, and Zangulus leaves. He reappears towards the end of Slayers NEXT, looking for a rematch. However, Gourry is being held prisoner by Hellmaster Fibrizo, so Zangulus does not get a chance to duel him a second time. He does help Lina and the others fight the Hellmaster. It is during this time that Zangulus meets and falls in love with Martina, who he marries after the battle.

=== Jillas ===
Voiced by: Takumi Yamazaki (Japanese); Maddie Blaustein (English)

Jillas Jillos Jilles (ジラス=ジロス=ジレス, Jirasu Jirosu Jiresu) is a red fox beastman and a servant of Valgaav. Jillas' people were nearly hunted to extinction. After being injured by humans and losing his left eye, Jillas is saved by Valgaav. He is partnered with Gravos Maunttop, who he refers to as "Boss". He has no knowledge of magic or swordplay, but is skilled with guns, gunpowder and various explosives. He also has a knack for exploiting the friction between people to his advantage, and employs psychological warfare against the Slayers to great effect.

In TRY, Valgaav orders Gravos and Jillas to locate and recover the five Dark Star weapons. When Gravos loses control of Ragudo Mezegis is blasted away by a Dragon Slave, Jillas swears vengeance on the Slayers, and succeeds in stealing Gorun Nova from Gourry. After everyone is separated and Valgaav is presumed dead, Jillas is rescued by a fox named Elena and her son Palou, who call him "uncle". He abandons them to seek vengeance when he discovers that the Slayers are still alive. Filia saves him from the explosion of one of his own bombs, after which he calls her "Boss", a name that makes her uncomfortable. After Valgaav is reborn as a pure Ancient Dragon and is adopted by Filia, Jillas and Gravos (who was literally launched into orbit by the Dragon Slave) become her partners and help her sell maces and pottery in a shop.

=== Gravos Maunttop ===
Voiced by: Hisao Egawa (Japanese); Nathan Price (English)

Gravos Maunttop (グラボス=マウントトップ, Gurabosu Mauntotoppu), a reptilian beastman, is a servant of Valgaav. His first appearance in the series is in Episode 54 of TRY. Gravos was almost killed by his own people, causing him to lose his right eye. Valgaav saves him and becomes his master. During TRY, Gravos and Jillas attempt to steal Gorun Nova on Valgaav's orders. During a struggle to get the holy magic and the black magic vessels from Princess Sera and Prince Marco, Gravos loses control of Ragudo Mezegis when he is hit by the Dragon Slave and is knocked into the distance, presumed dead. However, he is alive and well in the epilogue of TRY, once again partnered with Jillas and helping Filia run a store that sells maces and pottery.

=== Luna Inverse ===
Luna Inverse (ルナ=インバース, Runa Inbāsu), Lina's older sister, was born in a small village in Zephilia, the first daughter of merchants. Her father is an ex-mercenary and her mother is an ex-sorceress.

Luna and Lina's relationship is not particularly affectionate. Apparently, when they were younger, Lina would misbehave and Luna would "punish" her by making her do grueling workouts. The most notorious incident between the two was when Lina, ever keen on an opportunity to make some extra cash, set up a device that projected an image of Luna while she was taking a bath. Luna's reaction "compelled" Lina to begin her quest. Lina is still terrified of Luna, and even the mere mention of her sister sends Lina into a panic attack, as seen in Slayers TRY episode 2 and Slayers Revolution episode 8.

A fragment of Ceifeed's will is lodged within Luna. In Slayers TRY, when the Slayers visit the Fire Dragon Temple, it is mentioned that she is known as the "Ceifeed Knight". As the Knight of Ceifeed, Luna wields an immense amount of holy power. Luna never appears in person during the novels or the anime, but Hajime Kanzaka has said that she is slightly more powerful than Xellos. She can cut a Dragon Slave in half with an ordinary, non-magical sword, and once defeated a plasma dragon with a kitchen knife.

In Slayers TRY, Luna is Filia's first choice to save the world from the prophecy of destruction. Luna, being on the side of the gods, knows she is not the candidate in the prophecy; she turns down Filia's request and suggests Lina for the job instead.

== Deities ==
=== Shabranigdu ===
Voiced by: Daisuke Gōri (Japanese); Roger Kay (Episodes 8-10), Marc Thompson (Episodes 103-104) (English)

Ruby-Eye Shabranigdu (赤眼の魔王(ルビーアイ)シャブラニグドゥ, Rubī Ai Shaburanigudu; alternately "Shabranigdo"), also known as the Dark Lord, is a powerful being of evil, the ruler and strongest of the demons. One of the Dark Lords of four worlds alongside Dark Star, Chaotic Blue and Death Fog, he is said to be the sole source of misery and negative emotions in the Slayers world. Defeated long ago by Flare Dragon Ceifeed, Shabranigdu was split into seven parts and scattered throughout the world. Over a thousand years before the series begins, one of these parts awakened in the Kataart Mountains within the sorcerer Lei Magnus. When the piece of Shabranigdu within him awakened, he led the demons against a united army of dragons, humans, elves and dwarves. He was defeated and sealed in ice by Aqualord, a god and avatar of Ceifeed. However, Aqualord was destroyed, leaving only her memories and knowledge, which became the Claire Bible. The remaining four lieutenants (Dynast Graushera, Deep Sea Dolphin, Greater Beast Zellas Metallium, and Hellmaster Fibrizo) erected a shield that sealed the divine powers in the outer world, separated from the inner world where the Slayers takes place.

A second portion of Shabranigdu awakens in the first novel. Rezo the Red Priest awakens the fragment sealed within his eyes when he uses the philosopher's stone in an attempt to cure his blindness. Lina confronts the unbound piece of Shabranigdu, casting Giga Slave to defeat him. It is possible that Shabranigdu could have survived this attack, but a fragment of Rezo's remaining will forces open its defenses. A third portion of the Dark Lord is awakened in the fifteenth novel. Following the death of Mileena, Luke is driven to despair and develops hatred for the world; both humans and demons alike. He willingly merges with the Shabranigdu fragment hidden in his soul and plans to merge with the other fragment frozen in the Kataart Mountains, destroy the world, and then themselves. Lina destroys Luke/Shabranigdu by individually bursting and attacking with her four talismans that enhance magical capacity that she bought from Xellos, each representing one of the Dark Lords from the four worlds. The last one, representing Shabranigdu himself, only works because Luke wanted to die so he can see Mileena again.

In the Slayers Evolution-R anime, the Red Priest revives, bringing the fragment of Shabranigdu back to life with him. It possesses the true body of Pokota, and when Pokota returns to this body, it causes instability between the occupying souls, allowing Lina's perfected Giga Slave to destroy Shabranigdu.

=== Lord of Nightmares ===
The Lord of Nightmares (金色の魔王(ロード・オブ・ナイトメア), Rōdo obu Naitomea) is the demiurge of the Slayers universe, the creator of everything. It is the primodial Sea of Chaos that drifts below the many worlds of the universe. Although void or chaos is typically thought of as demonic, the Lord of Nightmares holds sovereignty over both the demons who wish to destroy and the living beings who seek to exist. Even among those steeped in the magical arts, few are aware of its existence.

The Lord of Nightmares created the entire Slayers multiverse, including the futuristic galaxy portrayed in Lost Universe, and two other known worlds, the realms of Chaotic Blue and Death Fog. Both Shabranigdu and his rival Ceifeed are its direct creations. The Lord of Nightmares may have done this simply because it wanted to watch gods, monsters, and mortals contend for amusement, a hypothesis adopted by Valgaav in Slayers TRY in his attempt to remake the world.

Lina is the only person known to directly use the power of the Lord of Nightmares in spells, and she is reluctant to do so as they are notoriously unreliable, with failure possibly having devastating consequences. Giga Slave, for instance, could theoretically destroy the world itself if miscast. Lina created the spell when she was much younger by combining parts of the Dragon Slave's incantation with words of the Lord of Nightmares that she found in a Claire Bible manuscript, and later perfected it after interacting with the real Claire Bible in the seventh novel. The Lord of Nightmares' only direct appearance is in the eighth novel, when Lina is forced into casting Giga Slave by Hellmaster Fibrizo, who wants her to lose control of it so it destroys the world. However, when he mistakenly thinks she has retained control over the spell, Fibrizo attacks Lina, not knowing that the Lord of Nightmares has taken over Lina's body as a vessel. As punishment, the Lord of Nightmares obliterates Fibrizo.

=== Ceifeed ===
Ceifeed (スィーフィード, Sīfīdo; alternately "Ceiphied"), also known as Flare Dragon Ceifeed (赤の竜神(フレアドラゴン)スィーフィード, Furea Doragon Sīfīdo), is God of the Slayers universe and the good dragonic counterpart to Shabranigdu. In each world of the universe, a Dragon King and a Demon King struggle against each other to direct the fate of the world. In the Red World, in which Slayers is set, Ceifeed is the Dragon King who battles the Demon King Ruby-Eye Shabranigdu. Ceifeed successfully weakened his demonic counterpart by cutting Shabranigdu into seven pieces. Ceifeed dies in the process, but leaves behind four Dragon Lord avatars to continue his struggle: Aqualord Ragradia (水竜王(アクアロード)ラグラディア, Akuarōdo Raguradia), Flarelord Vrabazard (火竜王(フレアロード)ヴラバザード, Furearōdo Vurabazādo), Airlord Valwin (空竜王(エアロード)バールウィン, Earōdo Bāruuin), and Earthlord Rangort (地竜王(アースロード)ランゴート, Āsurōdo Rangōto). A fragment of his will is lodged in Luna Inverse, Lina's older sister, who is known as the "Ceifeed Knight".

=== Dark Star ===
Dark Star Dugradigo (闇を撒くもの(ダーク・スター)デュグラディグドゥ, Dāku Sutā Duguradigudu) is one of the Dark Lords of the four worlds alongside Ruby-Eye Shabranigdu, Chaotic Blue and Death Fog. He is the main antagonist of the Black World, but is only referred to by name in Slayers.

In the Slayers TRY anime, he attempts to cross over into the Red World and cause further destruction. The gods of the Black World aim to destroy him using the five weapons he created: Gorun Nova (the Sword of Light), Ragudo Mezegis, Nezzard, Bodigar, and Galvayra. In his own world, Dark Star is the equivalent of Shabranigdu in power, as Volphied is the equivalent of Ceifeed. Dark Star devours Volphied, but grows so powerful that he can't control his own power, and becomes a being seeking only the destruction of everything. However, Valgaav reveals that Dark Star "devoured" Volphied by mutual agreement between the two. They realized how meaningless the eternal fight between gods and monsters was, and fused to bring "purification" to the worlds by destroying and remaking them so that gods and monsters would not have to constantly fight. Half monster and half god, the new Dark Star merges with Valgaav, who is the same combination. Dark Star's "astral body" is different from those of any other monster, making magic useless against him. Dark Star can only be defeated by the five weapons he created. When Filia and Xellos combine the powers of Light and Dark, of Ceifeed and Shabranigdu, and unleash it through the five weapons of Dark Star, the resulting Chaos force vanquishes him for good.
