= Fireworks, Should We See It from the Side or the Bottom? =

Fireworks, Should We See It from the Side or the Bottom? may refer to:

- "Fireworks, Should We See It from the Side or the Bottom?" (If: Moshimo), a 1993 Japanese youth drama TV play and TV episode
- Fireworks (2017 film), also known as Fireworks, Should We See It from the Side or the Bottom?, a 2017 Japanese anime film based on the TV film
