= Cosplay Mania =

Anime convention in the Philippines

- Genre: Cosplay
- Venue: SM Megatrade Hall (2008–2009) SMX Convention Center (2010–present)
- Location: Pasay
- Country: Philippines
- Inaugurated: 2008
- Most recent: 2025
- Attendance: About 23,000 (2013)
- Organizer: Cosplay.ph
- Website: http://www.cosplaymania.com/

Cosplay Mania is an annual cosplay-centered convention organized by Cosplay.ph. It is usually held in the fourth quarter of the year in the Philippines. The convention features various events related to cosplay, anime, and J-pop culture which features rookie and veteran cosplayers and cosplay enthusiasts.

== Overview ==
Cosplay Mania is created and hosted by Cosplay.ph, a Philippine-based cosplay website and organization. It is the fourth of six annual related events held by Cosplay.ph, alongside Cosplay Carnival, Fanfes, Anime and Cosplay Expo (ACX), CosMeet, and Cosplay Matsuri.

== Convention history ==
=== History ===
The first event was held at Megatrade Hall 3 in SM Megamall on October 12, 2008. It revolved around three main activities: Workshops, Costume Building Contest and the Cosplay competition for individuals and groups. Notable cosplayer Jin Joson and her group the Tux Team were invited to be part of the workshop tutorials as well as judge for the cosplay competition. It returned the following year to Megatrade Halls 2 and 3.

In 2010, Cosplay Mania moved to SMX Convention Center Manila in Pasay and was made two days long. It introduced the first nationwide cosplay competition called the Cosplay Tournament of Champions (TORCH), where winners of tournament legs from SM Cagayan De Oro, SM Clark, SM Davao, SM Cebu, and SM Manila converge for the finals at SMX. The event also invited international cosplayer guests to be part of the celebration and become part of the judges panel for Project Cosplay and TORCH.

In 2011, tickets were pre-sold online and in SM Supermalls nationwide in response to the long lines that plagued past iterations when ticket sales were sold on the day itself. Starting that year, halls of SMX were divided into two areas: one Fiesta Area (later "Hall EX" or the "Exhibits Hall") with merchandise and activity booths, and a Stage Area (later "Hall S", "Hall SP", or the "Special Performance Hall") where the main cosplay contests, band performances, meet-and-greets, and cosplay workshops. Access to the Stage Area required a higher-tier ticket. It also hosted the Philippine Cosplay Appreciation Day, where cosplayers were invited to register upon entering one of the function rooms in an attempt to set a Guinness World Record of the number of video game cosplayers attending an event. Starting that year, the event partnered with Anime Festival Asia (AFA), with the winning pair of TORCH becoming the official Philippine representatives to join AFA's Regional Cosplay Competition, performing against other cosplay teams from Malaysia, Thailand, Indonesia and Singapore. The Philippine Team, represented by Amado Carl Hernandez and Zhel Guiral, later won the AFA competition. In 2012, Cosplay Mania again attempted to set the Guinness World Record they attempted in 2011. Notable supporters of the event include the Department of Foreign Affairs, The Embassy of Japan in the Philippines, All Nippon Airways, Toei Animation Philippines and SGCafe.

Cosplay Mania in 2013 introduced the application of Cosplay.ph's CRS, or Cosplay Ranking System, where cosplayers who will join the event's contests are required to apply. This system would help designate the beginner and veteran ranking as to improve fairness in Cosplay.ph held competitions. 2013's TORCH winners Rommil Donair Jr. and Krislyn Branzuela won first runner-up at AFA.

In 2014, Cosplay Mania introduced the Japanese Anime Music (JAM) concert, a multi-day concert that occurs in the night of the event, with different performers for each night. Another higher-tier ticket was introduced which provided access to the JAM concert. In addition, a specific ticket for meet-and-greet sessions was added.

Cosplay Mania in 2020 was originally scheduled to be held on October 3–4, 2020, but was eventually cancelled due to the COVID-19 pandemic. Instead, Cosplay.ph held a related virtual convention named Fanfes Online. During Cosplay Carnival in 2022, Cosplay.ph announced the return of Cosplay Mania in 2022, along with ACX.

=== Convention locations ===
Dates	Venue	Atten.	Guests	JAM concert guests
October 12, 2008	SM Megamall Megatrade Hall 3, Mandaluyong, Metro Manila	6,000		N/A
September 13, 2009	SM Megamall Megatrade Hall 2 and 3, Mandaluyong, Metro Manila			N/A
October 2–3, 2010	SMX Convention Center Manila, Pasay, Metro Manila		Jesuke Jes, Clive Lee	N/A
October 1–2, 2011	SMX Convention Center Manila, Pasay, Metro Manila		JiakiDarkness, Clive Lee, Pinky Lu Xun, YukiGodBless	N/A
September 29–30, 2012	SMX Convention Center Manila, Pasay, Metro Manila	15,000	Jesuke Jes, KANAME☆, Reika	N/A
October 5–6, 2013	SMX Convention Center Manila, Pasay, Metro Manila		Shinji (Endless Illution [sic]), Jesuke Jes, KANAME☆, Pinky Lu Xun, Goldy Marg, Orochi X, Reika, Starpolaris Reiko, Vic, Viospace	N/A
October 4–5, 2014	SMX Convention Center Manila, Pasay, Metro Manila		Aya Ikeda, Jesuke Jes, KANAME☆, Vic Kumiko, Linda Le (Vampy Bit Me), Pinky Lu Xun, Reika, Loverin Tamburin, Inui Tatsumi, Orochi X	Aya Ikeda, KANAME☆, Moonspeak, Reika, LOVERIN TAMBURIN, Ninja Tuna
October 3–4, 2015	SMX Convention Center Manila, Pasay, Metro Manila	36,000	Itsuki Akira, Hana and Baozi, Aya Ikeda, Jesuke Jes, KANAME☆, Ladybeard, Pile, Loverin Tamburin, Ying Tze	Itsuki Akira, Aya Ikeda, Ladybeard, Pile, LOVERIN TAMBURIN
October 1–2, 2016	SMX Convention Center Manila, Pasay, Metro Manila		DD-Tenka, Tokyo Performance Domo, Baozi and Hana, Hiko, Riho Iida, Kanako Ito, KANAME☆, Kirisaki, Back On, Ruka, Rumi, Yukari Shimotsuki, Starmarie, Tomia	Back-On, Tokyo Performance Domo, Riho Iida, Kanako Ito, Starmarie
September 30–October 1, 2017	SMX Convention Center Manila, Pasay, Metro Manila		Angie, Eki, Wataru Hatano, Hikarin, Knitemaya, Kong, kradness, Koutaro Nishimiya, Elisa, Shiena Nishizawa, Fuuko Noda, Siutao, Konomi Suzuki, Sayo Yamamoto	Elisa, kradness, Shiena Nishizawa, Konomi Suzuki
September 29–30, 2018	SMX Convention Center Manila, Pasay, Metro Manila		AiRI, Astarohime, Emperor Cosplay, Kousuke Asuma, fhána, Hakken, Hiroki Ino, Hiroto Kurumasu, Megumi Nakajima, Ola Aphrodite, Chiharu Sawashiro, DJ SunaP, Shunsuke Takeuchi, Zwei	AiRI, fhána, Megumi Nakajima, Zwei
September 28–29, 2019	SMX Convention Center Manila, Pasay, Metro Manila		Mirai Akari, ASAKA, Kousuke Asuma, BoiledCurry, Hige Driver, VENaS Japan, Rea Kami, Allen Kohatsu, Motoko Kumai, Hiroto Kurumasu, May'n, Yasutaka Nakata, Rumi Okubo, Ichigo Rinahamu, MYTH & ROID	ASAKA, May'n, Yasutaka Nakata, Ichigo Rinahamu, MYTH & ROID
October 1–2, 2022	SMX Convention Center Manila, Pasay, Metro Manila		Moona Hoshinova, Hiroto Kuramasu, Thames Malerose, MindaRyn, Kureiji Ollie, Onnies, Pavolia Reine, Ayunda Risu, Nozomu Sasaki, Yosuke Sora	Moona Hoshinova, MindaRyn, Pavolia Reine
September 30–October 1, 2023	SMX Convention Center Manila, Pasay, Metro Manila	12,000	Mizuno Aki, Ami Amami, BPM15Q, Daoko, Junna, Rita Kamishiro, Kobo Kanaeru, Knite, Kaela Kovalskia, Hiroto Kurumasu, Shiki Miyoshino, Phil Mizuno, Nano, Clarissa Punipun, Diane Sabandeja, Vestia Zeta	BPM15Q, Daoko, Junna, Nano
October 4–6, 2024	SMX Convention Center Manila, Pasay, Metro Manila	20,000	Asca, BRADIO, Su Ling Chan, Chiai Fujikawa, sajou no hana, Hiroto Kurumasu, kz(livetune), Anya Melfissa, Octavio, Jurard T. Rexford, Nami Tamaki, Vestia Zeta, Lea, Taryn, Byoru	Asca, BRADIO, Chiai Fujikawa, sajou no hana, kz(livetune), Nami Tamaki
October 3–5, 2025	SMX Convention Center Manila, Pasay, Metro Manila	40,000 - 50,000 (estimated)	angela, Shouta Aoi, Holostars English ARMIS (Jurard T. Rexford, Goldbullet, Octavio, Crimzon Ruze), Kousuke Asuma, Stereo Dive Foundation, Le Josette, Kairi Miura, Sangatsu no Phantasia, Jacob Takanashi, Thames, TRUE, Unnämed	angela, Shouta Aoi, Stereo Dive Foundation, Octavio, Sangatsu no Phantasia, TRUE, Unnämed
