= Kantai Collection (TV series) =

Japanese anime television series

- Cover of the first Blu-ray volume featuring (from left to right) Yūdachi, Fubuki and Mutsuki

艦隊これくしょん -艦これ- (Kantai Korekushon: Kankore)
- Genre: Action, comedy, military
- Created by: DMM.com; Kadokawa Games; C2 Praparat
- Anime television series

1st anime: "Kantai Collection: KanColle"
- Directed by: Keizō Kusakawa
- Produced by: Junichirō Tamura; Satoshi Motonaga
- Written by: Jukki Hanada
- Music by: Natsumi Kameoka
- Studio: Diomedéa
- Licensed by: Crunchyroll; AUS: Madman Entertainment; NA: Funimation
- Original network: MX 1, KBS, Sun TV, KNB, RCC, TVQ, CTC, tvk, TV Saitama, TV Aichi, KHB, BSN, BS11, HBC, TSC, NBC, RKK, AKT
- English network: SEA: Aniplus Asia
- Original run: January 8, 2015 – March 26, 2015
- Episodes: 12
- Anime film
- KanColle: The Movie (2016)
- Anime television series

2nd anime: "KanColle: Someday in that Sea"
- Directed by: Kazuya Miura
- Written by: Kensuke Tanaka
- Music by: Kaori Ohkoshi
- Studio: ENGI
- Licensed by: Crunchyroll
- Original run: November 4, 2022 – March 25, 2023
- Episodes: 8

Kantai Collection (Japanese: 艦隊これくしょん, Hepburn: Kantai Korekushon; translated as "Fleet Collection", subtitled as "Fleet Girls Collection"), known as KanColle (艦これ, KanKore) for short, is a 2015 Japanese anime television series produced by Diomedéa, based on the game of the same name by Kadokawa Games. The series was announced in September 2013, and aired from January to March 2015. An animated film, titled KanColle: The Movie (劇場版 艦これ, Gekijō-ban KanKore), was released on November 26, 2016.

A second installment titled KanColle: Someday in that Sea (「艦これ」いつかあの海で, KanKore: Itsuka Ano Umi de; Official: Fleet Girls Collection "KanColle" 1944 -I・TSU・KA・A・NO・U・MI・DE-) by ENGI aired from November 2022 to March 2023. The stories of the first and second anime are not connected and are separate works, not being set in the same universe and timeline.

== Plot ==
In a world where humanity faces the threat of the abyssal fleet which has taken over the seas, special human girls who don weaponized outfits and possess the spirit of historical naval vessels known as kanmusu (艦娘; literally "fleet girls" or "ship girls") are the only ones capable of countering them. The kanmusu live together at a naval base, where they spend their everyday lives as they begin training for battle.

=== 1st anime ===
The series features the destroyer Fubuki as the main character, with the storyline based on her point of view. Fubuki arrives at the naval base, where she meets other girls that she will eventually fight alongside. Despite lacking adequate combat training, she is recommended into the Third Torpedo Squadron by the admiral, and quickly finds herself sortied into battle. Upon being rescued by Akagi in a dangerous situation, Fubuki strives to do her best in order to train, with the hopes of eventually being able to fight alongside Akagi.

==== Film ====
The film follows the development of the 1st anime, keeping the main cast with some new additions. Kisaragi plays here a more prominent role, and the movie also introduces another element from the game, a "Dark Portal".

=== 2nd anime ===
In the second anime, the series shifted its spotlight to Shiratsuyu-class destroyer Shigure, with the storyline being loosely based on the final two years of the Pacific War. As the Abyssal Fleet encroaches on Leyte Gulf, Shigure, along with a few other kanmusu, are assigned to the First Striking Force, Third Section, which serves as a diversionary fleet. Even if the mission is going to be suicidal, Shigure refuses to let the enemy take another comrade from her.

== Characters ==
=== Characters (1st anime) ===
==== Destroyers (1st anime) ====
Fubuki (吹雪)
Voiced by: Sumire Uesaka (Japanese); Felecia Angelle (English)
A newcomer destroyer to the naval base, and assigned to the Third Torpedo Squadron (第三水雷戦隊, Dai-san suirai sentai), Fubuki is the main protagonist of the first installment of the series. Meek and timid, at the beginning of the series she has no combat experience prior to transferring to the base, and performs poorly at physical activity. She is assigned temporarily to the Southwest Area Fleet (南西方面艦隊, Nansei hōmen kantai) during the Battle of Southwest Area, before being transferred to the Fifth Mobile Fleet (第五遊撃部隊, Dai-go yūgeki butai) during Operation MO and Operation FS, where she earns the respect of her peers, who choose her as their Flagship. Having a deep admiration for Akagi, she dreams of eventually becoming her escort, eventually doing so following her first remodel.
Mutsuki (睦月)
Voiced by: Rina Hidaka (Japanese); Cherami Leigh (English)
One of the members of the Third Torpedo Squadron. The first kanmusu Fubuki meets on the base, Mutsuki has a cheerful and responsible personality. She is later transferred to the Fourth Fleet (第四艦隊, Dai-yon kantai) with Mogami during Operation FS.
Yūdachi (夕立)
Voiced by: Yumi Tanibe (Japanese); Leah Clark (English)
Another destroyer of the Third Torpedo Squadron, alongside Fubuki and Mutsuki, who has a laid back attitude. She has a verbal tic as she speaks, often inserting "poi" (ぽい, "maybe") into her sentences (a reference to her uncertain actions during the Battle of Guadalcanal). She is later transferred to Naka's fleet during Operation FS, before getting a second remodel and being transferred again to the First Carrier Task Force (第一機動部隊, Dai-ichi kidō butai) (consisting of Akagi).
Kisaragi (如月)
Voiced by: Rina Hidaka (Japanese); Kasi Hollowell (English)
Another destroyer who is instead assigned to the Fourth Torpedo Squadron (第四水雷戦隊, Dai-yon suirai sentai) during the Battle of W island. She has a mature personality, even more mature than her older sister Mutsuki. She is sunk during the Battle of W island.
Yayoi (弥生), Mochizuki (望月)
Voiced by: Rina Hidaka (Japanese); Alison Viktorin (Yayoi), Jill Harris (Mochizuki) (English)
Two destroyers whom Fubuki and Mutsuki met during the briefing session of the W Island raid. Mochizuki is quite a sleepyhead, while Yayoi is rather emotionless. Both are later assigned to the Fourth Torpedo Squadron during the Battle of W island.
Akatsuki (暁), Hibiki (響), Ikazuchi (雷), Inazuma (電)
Voiced by: Aya Suzaki (Japanese); Monica Rial (Akatsuki), Apphia Yu (Hibiki), Lara Woodhull (Ikazuchi), Camille Liedtka (Inazuma) (English)
Four destroyers belonging to the Sixth Destroyer Division (第六駆逐隊, Dai-roku kuchikutai) and assigned to the Second Support Fleet (第二支援艦隊, Dai-ni shien kantai) (Akatsuki and Hibiki) and the First Carrier Task Force (Ikazuchi and Inazuma) during the Battle of the Sea in Front of the Naval Base. Akatsuki considers herself an adult lady, while Hibiki tends to speak Russian frequently, rarely saying anything but "хорошо" (Khorosho, "Very well" in Russian), Ikazuchi has a very caring and confident personality, and Inazuma is a timid girl. Akatsuki and Ikazuchi do not get along very well, as they constantly argue about whatever went wrong, such as Inazuma using a flamethrower to boil their curry faster only to end up burning the entire pot, making Inazuma cry and blame herself for the failure.
Shimakaze (島風)
Voiced by: Ayane Sakura (Japanese); Megan Shipman (English)
A destroyer who claims herself to be the fastest in the whole fleet, and indeed is. She is assigned to the Southwest Area Fleet during the Battle of Southwest Area. She has a hyperactive personality and tends to jump around rooms like a rabbit while waiting, to the point of forgetting what her next mission is.

==== Aircraft carriers (1st anime) ====
Akagi (赤城)
Voiced by: Saki Fujita (Japanese); Tia Ballard (English)
An aircraft carrier belonging to the First Carrier Division (第一航空戦隊 (一航戦), Dai-ichi kōkū sentai (Ikkōsen)) and assigned to the First Carrier Task Force. Akagi engages enemy ships by firing arrows with her bow, which transform into aircraft piloted by fairies. Due to her past combat history, she is held in high esteem throughout the base. Her massive appetite is only outdone by Yamato-class battleships.
Kaga (加賀)
Voiced by: Yuka Iguchi (Japanese); Jeannie Tirado (English)
An aircraft carrier of the First Carrier Division and assigned to the First Carrier Task Force during the Battle of the Sea in Front of the Naval Base, who frequently accompanies Akagi. She dislikes Shōkaku and Zuikaku of the Fifth Carrier Division (第五航空戦隊 (五航戦), Dai-go kōkū sentai (Gokōsen)), and does not feel confident giving orders to any kanmusu not of her class. She especially refuses to follow orders from Zuikaku, considering the girl's command to be misguided, but will praise them as hard working girls. She appears distant but seems to have a soft spot for Akagi. She is later assigned to the Fifth Mobile Fleet during Operation MO and Operation FS.
Sōryū (蒼龍), Hiryū (飛龍)
Voiced by: Sumire Uesaka (Japanese); Sara Ragsdale (Sōryū), Michelle Rojas (Hiryū) (English)
Two aircraft carriers of the Second Carrier Division assigned to the First Carrier Task Force during the Battle of the Sea in Front of the Naval Base.

Shōkaku (翔鶴)
Voiced by: Iori Nomizu (Japanese); Mikaela Krantz (English)
An aircraft carrier of the Fifth Carrier Division and assigned to the Fourth Fleet during the Battle of the Sea in Front of the Naval Base. She advised her sister Zuikaku to avoid arguing with the experienced Kaga, but she seems to have satirized Kaga and the First Carrier Division potentially as escorts.
Zuikaku (瑞鶴)
Voiced by: Iori Nomizu (Japanese); Sarah Wiedenheft (English)
Another aircraft carrier of the Fifth Carrier Division assigned to the Fifth Mobile Fleet during Operation MO and Operation FS. Just like Kaga who dislikes the Fifth Carrier Division, Zuikaku also dislikes the First Carrier Division, although Fubuki later helps Zuikaku ease her relationship with Kaga.
Taihō (大鳳)
Voiced by: Mamiko Noto (Japanese); Sally Haden (English)
An aircraft carrier who was last seen as an observer of Operation MI, though she appears as an obscure silhouette. She finally made her full appearance in the last phase of Operation MI as a reinforcement, finishing off the remaining Abyssal ships. Unlike the other carriers, she uses a repeating crossbow to launch her planes.

==== Light aircraft carriers (1st anime) ====
Shōhō (祥鳳)
A light aircraft carrier of another naval base. During Operation MO, She is assigned to the MO Strategy Main Force (MO攻略本隊, Emu Ō Kōryaku Hontai) along with Aoba, Furutaka, Kako and Kinugasa, is sortied along with the Covering Force (掩護部隊, Engo Butai) of Tenryū and Tatsuta, but she is badly damaged by the air raid of enemy aircraft carriers.
Chitose (千歳), Chiyoda (千代田)
Two seaplane carriers briefly appearing in a reconnaissance before Operation MI.

==== Battleships/Battlecruisers (1st anime) ====
Kongō (金剛), Hiei (比叡), Haruna (榛名), Kirishima (霧島)
Voiced by: Nao Tōyama (Japanese); Alexis Tipton (Kongō), Dawn M. Bennett (Hiei), Bryn Apprill (Haruna), Trina Nishimura (Kirishima) (English)
These four battlecruisers are assigned to the Second Support Fleet (Kongō and Hiei) and the Fourth Fleet (Haruna and Kirishima) during the Battle of the Sea in Front of the Naval Base. During the Battle of W island, they operated together as members of the Second Fleet (第二艦隊, Dai-ni kantai), and later as part of the Southwest Area Fleet during the Battle of Southwest Area.
These four kanmusu have different personalities, but are all generally airheaded and excitable, to Mutsu's amusement and Fubuki's chagrin. Kongō is cheerful and has a habit of mixing English words into her speech, reflecting the fact that the ship whose spirit she represents was built in Britain. Hiei has an elder sister complex towards Kongō, right down to being jealous whenever she is ignored. Haruna is humble and speaks in third person, while Kirishima has a habit of testing microphones.
During Operation MO and Operation FS Kongō is transferred to the Fifth Mobile Fleet, where she operates separate from her sister ships.
Nagato (長門), Mutsu (陸奥)
Voiced by: Ayane Sakura (Japanese); Elizabeth Maxwell (Nagato), Morgan Garrett (Mutsu) (English)
Two battleships who take on a command role from within the communications room of the naval base, relaying orders from the admiral to the fleets. Nagato does most of the commanding, while Mutsu acts as an assistant. Nagato is the serious and no-nonsense voice of authority but has a soft spot for cute animals and acts gruff to conceal her softer side, while Mutsu is more demure and seductive.
Yamato (大和)
Voiced by: Ayana Taketatsu (Japanese); Christina Kelly (English)
The most powerful battleship ever built, she is the navy's trump card and her existence has been kept a secret. She runs a forward base in Truk Lagoon during Operation FS. However, due to her need for large quantities of food and supplies, she has limited experience at sea. Historically, her living conditions were luxurious hence her nickname "Hotel Yamato", a moniker she dislikes.

==== Heavy cruisers (1st anime) ====
Ashigara (足柄)
Voiced by: Risa Taneda (Japanese); Kristi Rothrock (English)
A heavy cruiser who works as a teacher at the naval base's school. She is very strict for a teacher in that she even punished Yūdachi by giving the latter more homework after school, staying true to her nickname of "The Hungry Wolf". She is also considered a failure at getting dates with men.
Nachi (那智), Haguro (羽黒)
Voiced by: Risa Taneda (Japanese); Michelle Lee (Nachi), Kristen Lee (Haguro) (English)
Two heavy cruisers who, like Ashigara, also work as teachers at the naval base's school. Nachi has a serious personality, while Haguro is a timid girl.
Takao (高雄)
Voiced by: Nao Tōyama (Japanese); Jamie Marchi (English)
Another heavy cruiser whom Fubuki met when preparing for the raid on W Island. Her personality mirrors Atago, in that she is the more responsible of the two.
Atago (愛宕)
Voiced by: Nao Tōyama (Japanese); Kristi Kang (English)
A heavy cruiser assigned to the Fourth Fleet during the Battle of the Sea in Front of the Naval Base, whom Fubuki ran into while the latter was searching for Akagi in the dorm's hot springs. However, due to a misunderstanding, she let Fubuki dock in the hot springs, thinking that the latter is severely damaged.

Mogami (最上)
Voiced by: Aya Suzaki (Japanese); Lynsey Hale (English)
An aviation cruiser assigned to the Second Support Fleet during the Battle of the Sea in Front of the Naval Base and later the Fourth Fleet during Operation FS along with Mutsuki.
Tone (利根), Chikuma (筑摩)
Voiced by: Yuka Iguchi (Japanese); Skyler McIntosh (Tone), Whitney Rodgers (Chikuma) (English)
Two heavy cruisers who, like the Myōkō sisters, work as teachers at the naval base's school. Tone teaches running in the destroyer class, and both she and Chikuma supervise Fubuki's training.
Furutaka (古鷹), Kako (加古)
Voiced by: Yuka Ōtsubo
Two heavy cruisers who appeared in the movie. They have different personalities. Furutaka takes her pride as a heavy cruiser seriously, while Kako is a sleepyhead.
Chōkai (鳥海)

A heavy cruiser who appears in the movie. She is last seen observing Kitakami and Ōi sharing their moments together at the Naval Base's park much to her dismay in the official trailer.

==== Light cruisers (1st anime) ====
Kuma (球磨), Tama (多摩)
Voiced by: Ayane Sakura (Japanese); Alex Moore (Kuma), Marla Acevedo (Tama) (English)
Two light cruisers assigned to the Fourth Fleet during the Battle of the Sea in Front of the Naval Base and later the Fourth Torpedo Squadron during the Battle of W island. Both of them have their own verbal tic as they speak, with Kuma often inserting "kuma" into her sentences, while Tama has "nya".
Kitakami (北上), Ōi (大井)
Voiced by: Yuka Ōtsubo (Japanese); Morgan Berry (Kitakami), Amber Lee Connors (Ōi) (English)
Two Kuma-class cruisers rebuilt into torpedo cruisers. They are always seen together due to Kitakami being the object of obsession for Ōi, who is wary of anyone who touches or talks with Kitakami, dealing with them in a quite rude and furious attitude. They are now a part of the Fifth Mobile Fleet during Operation MO and Operation FS.
Ōi said that they are not light cruisers, and they call themselves Torpedo Cruisers.
In Truk Lagoon, Ōi is also shown to have a fear of snakes.

Yūbari (夕張)
Voiced by: Sarah Emi Bridcutt (Japanese); Kristen McGuire (English)
Another light cruiser assigned to the Second Support Fleet during the Battle of the Sea in Front of the Naval Base, who later becomes the flagship of the Fourth Torpedo Squadron during the Battle of W island. During Operation MO, she became the flagship of the Third Fleet (第三艦隊, Dai-san kantai), along with the MO Strategy Main Force and the Covering Force of another naval base, with the task of supporting the Fifth Mobile Fleet.
Ōyodo (大淀)
Voiced by: Ayako Kawasumi (Japanese); Madeleine Morris (English)
A light cruiser who also works as a quest giver to the kanmusu. She mostly locates enemy bases from the communications room's radar and tells the fleet when an enemy has been spotted. She is also responsible for the equipment given to the kanmusu prior to their sortie.

Sendai (川内), Jintsū (神通), Naka (那珂)
Voiced by: Ayane Sakura (Japanese); Brittney Karbowski (Sendai), Natalie Hoover (Jintsū), Jad Saxton (Naka) (English)
Three light cruisers belonging to the Third Torpedo Squadron. They give Fubuki different training sessions unique to them. Sendai trains Fubuki in balancing (since Special Type Destroyers tend to randomly lose balance), Jintsū in target accuracy, and Naka in confidence (i.e. smiling and standing out in front of other kanmusu). Jintsū is the flagship of the Third Torpedo Squadron.
These three kanmusu have different characteristics. Sendai looks energetic and loves night battles. Jintsū is gentle and quiet but also responsible. Naka is always active and happy, likes singing and dancing, even identifying herself as the idol of the fleet.
Naka would later be transferred to another fleet which also consists of former Third Torpedo Squadron member Yūdachi during Operation FS.

==== Others (1st anime) ====
Mamiya (間宮)
Voiced by: Yui Horie (Japanese); Mallorie Rodak (English)
A food supply ship who works as a chef at the naval base's restaurant and sweets cafe Mamiya (甘味処 間宮, Kanmi-dokoro Mamiya). She mostly makes sweets like parfait for the kanmusu.
Admiral (Commander) (提督 (司令官), Teitoku (Shireikan))
The admiral of all the kanmusu, only shown through shadow or first-person view. It's assumed that the faceless and voiceless portrayal is in order to not interfere with the viewers' own vision of the admiral, as the game's admirals are the players themselves. The Admiral's gender is also ambiguous, though Crunchyroll's subtitled release refers to as a male.

=== Characters (2nd anime) ===
Here is the list of all ships featured in the second anime. Ship girls have personalities identical to the game and the first anime, with more development around the main cast. In addition, the Admiral is no longer an ambiguous figure, being clearly defined as a character, being voiced by Ken Narita.

Type	Girl	Voiced by	Role	Episode										Notes
Type	Girl	Voiced by	Role	OP	ED	1	2	3	4	5	6	7	8	Notes
DD	Shigure Kai Ni	Yumi Tanibe	Protagonist	✔️	✔️	✔️	✔️	✔️	✔️	✔️	✔️	✔️	✔️	Kai Ni; Kai San at the end of Ep7
BB	Yamashiro Kai Ni	Saki Fujita	Main	✔️	✔️	✔️	✔️	✔️	✔️	❌	❌	✔️	✔️	Kai Ni form, but BB and not BBV
BB	Fusō Kai Ni	Saki Fujita	Main	✔️	✔️	✔️	✔️	✔️	✔️	❌	❌	✔️	✔️	Kai Ni form, but BB and not BBV
CA	Mogami Kai Ni	Aya Suzaki	Main	✔️	✔️	✔️	✔️	✔️	✔️	✔️	❌	✔️	✔️	Kai Ni
CL	Yahagi Kai Ni	Yuki Yamada	Main	✔️	✔️	❌	❌	✔️	✔️	✔️	✔️	✔️	✔️	Kai Ni
DD	Yukikaze Kai	Saki Fujita	Main	✔️	✔️	✔️	❌	✔️	✔️	✔️	✔️	✔️	✔️	Kai; Tan Yang Ep8 Ending
DD	Isokaze B Kai	Ayako Kawasumi	Main	✔️	✔️	✔️	❌	✔️	✔️	✔️	✔️	✔️	✔️	B Kai
DD	Hamakaze B Kai	Mana Komatsu	Main	✔️	✔️	✔️	❌	✔️	✔️	✔️	✔️	✔️	✔️	B Kai
DD	Michishio Kai Ni	Wakana Miyakawa	Supporting	✔️	✔️	✔️	✔️	✔️	✔️	❌	❌	✔️	✔️	Kai Ni
DD	Asagumo Kai	Yui Horie	Supporting	✔️	✔️	✔️	✔️	✔️	✔️	❌	❌	✔️	✔️	Kai
DD	Yamagumo Kai	Yui Horie	Supporting	✔️	✔️	✔️	✔️	✔️	✔️	❌	❌	✔️	✔️	Kai
BC	Haruna Kai Ni	Nao Tōyama	Supporting	✔️	✔️	❌	❌	✔️	❌	❌	❌	✔️	✔️	Kai Ni
CVL/AS	Ryūhō	Yui Ogura	Supporting	❌	❌	✔️	❌	✔️	❌	❌	✔️	❌	✔️	Base remodel Ep1; Taigei Ep3; Kai Ep6; Kai Ni Ep8
CL	Ōyodo Kai	Ayako Kawasumi	Supporting	✔️	✔️	❌	❌	❌	✔️	✔️	✔️	✔️	✔️	Kai
DD	Suzutsuki Kai	Saki Fujita	Supporting	✔️	✔️	❌	❌	❌	✔️	✔️	❌	✔️	✔️	Kai
DD	Fuyutsuki Kai	Sumire Uesaka	Supporting	✔️	✔️	❌	❌	❌	✔️	✔️	❌	✔️	✔️	Kai
CA	Nachi Kai Ni	Risa Taneda	Secondary	❌	❌	✔️	✔️	✔️	❌	❌	❌	❌	✔️	Kai Ni
CA	Ashigara Kai Ni	Risa Taneda	Secondary	❌	❌	✔️	✔️	✔️	❌	❌	❌	❌	✔️	Kai Ni
CL	Abukuma Kai Ni	Iori Nomizu	Secondary	❌	❌	✔️	✔️	✔️	❌	❌	❌	❌	✔️	Kai Ni
DD	Akebono Kai Ni	Kozue Hayasaka	Secondary	❌	✔️	✔️	❌	✔️	❌	❌	❌	✔️	✔️	Kai Ni
DD	Ushio Kai Ni	Kozue Hayasaka	Secondary	❌	✔️	✔️	❌	✔️	❌	❌	❌	✔️	✔️	Kai Ni
DD	Kasumi Kai Ni	Wakana Miyakawa	Secondary	✔️	✔️	❌	❌	✔️	✔️	✔️	✔️	✔️	❌	Kai Ni
DD	Shiranui Kai Ni	Saki Fujita	Secondary	❌	❌	✔️	❌	✔️	❌	❌	❌	❌	❌	Kai Ni
DD	Shiratsuyu Kai Ni	Yumi Tanibe	Secondary	✔️	❌	✔️	❌	❌	❌	✔️	❌	✔️	✔️	Kai Ni
BC	Kongō Kai Ni	Nao Tōyama	Secondary	❌	✔️	✔️	❌	✔️	❌	❌	❌	❌	✔️	Kai Ni
DD	Asashimo Kai Ni	Ai Kayano	Secondary	✔️	✔️	✔️	❌	✔️	✔️	✔️	✔️	✔️	✔️	Kai Ni
DD	Hatsushimo Kai Ni	Motoko Kobayashi	Secondary	✔️	✔️	✔️	❌	✔️	✔️	✔️	✔️	✔️		Kai Ni
DD	Hibiki	Aya Suzaki	Secondary	❌	✔️	❌	❌	✔️	✔️	✔️	❌	✔️	✔️	
BB	Yamato	Ayana Taketatsu	Secondary	✔️	❌	✔️	❌	✔️	❌	❌	❌	✔️	✔️	Kai Ni Juu on Ep8
DD	Kiyoshimo	Hisako Kanemoto	Secondary	❌	✔️	❌	❌	✔️	✔️	✔️	❌	✔️	✔️	
BB	Ise Kai	Yuka Ōtsubo	Secondary	❌	✔️	✔️	❌	❌	❌	❌	✔️	✔️	✔️	Kai
BB	Hyūga Kai	Yuka Ōtsubo	Secondary	❌	✔️	✔️	❌	❌	❌	❌	✔️	✔️	✔️	Kai
CA	Tone Kai Ni	Yuka Iguchi	Secondary	❌	✔️	❌	❌	✔️	❌	❌	❌	✔️	✔️	Kai Ni
CA	Aoba	Aya Suzaki	Secondary	❌	❌	❌	❌	❌	❌	❌	❌	✔️	✔️	
CLT	Kitakami Kai Ni	-	Background cast	❌	✔️	❌	❌	❌	❌	❌	❌	✔️	✔️	Kai Ni
DD	Hayashimo	-	Background cast	❌	❌	✔️	❌	✔️	❌	❌	❌	❌	❌	
DD	Akishimo	-	Background cast	❌	❌	✔️	❌	✔️	❌	❌	❌	❌	❌	
DD	Naganami Kai Ni	-	Background cast	❌	❌	✔️	❌	❌	❌	❌	❌	❌	❌	Kai Ni
DD	Shimakaze	-	Background cast	❌	❌	✔️	❌	❌	❌	❌	❌	❌	❌	
CA	Maya Kai Ni	-	Background cast	❌	❌	✔️	❌	❌	❌	❌	❌	❌	❌	Kai Ni
CA	Chōkai Kai Ni	-	Background cast	❌	❌	✔️	❌	❌	❌	❌	❌	❌	❌	Kai Ni
DD	Kishinami	-	Background cast	❌	❌	✔️	❌	✔️	❌	❌	❌	❌	❌	
DD	Okinami Kai Ni	-	Background cast	❌	❌	✔️	❌	✔️	❌	❌	❌	❌	❌	Kai Ni
DD	Fujinami	-	Background cast	❌	❌	✔️	❌	❌	❌	❌	❌	❌	❌	
DD	Hamanami	-	Background cast	❌	❌	✔️	❌	❌	❌	❌	❌	❌	❌	
CVL	Zuihō	-	Background cast	❌	❌	✔️	❌	❌	❌	❌	❌	❌	❌	
DD	Akizuki	-	Background cast	❌	❌	✔️	❌	❌	❌	❌	❌	❌	❌	
DD	Hatsuzuki	-	Background cast	❌	❌	✔️	❌	❌	❌	❌	❌	❌	❌	
CL	Noshiro Kai Ni	-	Background cast	❌	❌	❌	❌	✔️	❌	❌	❌	❌	❌	Kai Ni
CA	Suzuya Kai Ni	-	Background cast	❌	❌	❌	❌	✔️	❌	❌	❌	❌	❌	Kai Ni
cA	Kumano Kai Ni	-	Background cast	❌	❌	❌	❌	✔️	❌	❌	❌	❌	❌	Kai Ni
CA	Chikuma Kai Ni	-	Background cast	❌	❌	❌	❌	✔️	❌	❌	❌	❌	❌	Kai Ni
CA	Myōkō Kai Ni	-	Background cast	❌	❌	❌	❌	✔️	❌	❌	❌	❌	❌	Kai Ni
CA	Haguro Kai Ni	-	Background cast	❌	❌	❌	❌	✔️	❌	❌	❌	❌	❌	Kai Ni
DD	Urakaze D Kai	-	Background cast	❌	❌	❌	❌	✔️	❌	❌	❌	❌	❌	D Kai
DE	Etorofu	-	Background cast	❌	❌	❌	❌	❌	❌	✔️	❌	❌	❌	
DE	Matsuwa	-	Background cast	❌	❌	❌	❌	❌	❌	✔️	❌	❌	❌	
DE	Hiburi	-	Background cast	❌	❌	❌	❌	❌	❌	✔️	❌	❌	❌	
DE	Daitō	-	Background cast	❌	❌	❌	❌	❌	❌	✔️	❌	❌	❌	
DE	Mikura	-	Background cast	❌	❌	❌	❌	❌	❌	❌	✔️	❌	❌	
DE	Kurahashi	-	Background cast	❌	❌	❌	❌	❌	❌	❌	✔️	❌	❌	
DE	Yashiro	-	Background cast	❌	❌	❌	❌	❌	❌	❌	✔️	❌	❌	
DE	Kaiboukan No.30	-	Background cast	❌	❌	❌	❌	❌	❌	❌	✔️	❌	❌	
SS	I-203	-	Background cast	❌	❌	❌	❌	❌	❌	❌	❌	✔️	❌	
AS	Jingei	-	Background cast	❌	❌	❌	❌	❌	❌	❌	❌	✔️	❌	
DD	Take	-	Background cast	❌	❌	❌	❌	❌	❌	❌	❌	✔️	✔️	
DD	a Matsu-class	-	Background cast	❌	❌	❌	❌	❌	❌	❌	❌	❌	✔️	Was intruduced in the anime before the game Probably "Kuwa"
DD	Oboro Kai	-	Background cast	❌	❌	❌	❌	❌	❌	❌	❌	✔️	❌	Kai
DD	Sazanami Kai	-	Background cast	❌	❌	❌	❌	❌	❌	❌	❌	✔️	❌	Kai
DD	Ariake	-	Background cast	❌	❌	❌	❌	❌	❌	❌	❌	✔️	❌	
DD	Yūgure	-	Background cast	❌	❌	❌	❌	❌	❌	❌	❌	✔️	❌	Was intruduced in the anime before the game
DD	Murasame Kai Ni	-	Background cast	❌	❌	❌	❌	❌	❌	❌	❌	✔️	✔️	Kai Ni
DD	Yūdachi Kai Ni	-	Background cast	❌	❌	❌	❌	❌	❌	❌	❌	✔️	✔️	Kai Ni
CL	Sakawa	-	Background cast	❌	❌	❌	❌	❌	❌	❌	❌	❌	✔️	
BB	Warspite	-	Friendly Fleet	❌	❌	❌	❌	❌	❌	❌	❌	❌	✔️	
BB	Nelson Kai	-	Friendly Fleet	❌	❌	❌	❌	❌	❌	❌	❌	❌	✔️	Kai
CV	Victorious	-	Friendly Fleet	❌	❌	❌	❌	❌	❌	❌	❌	❌	✔️	
CL	Sheffield	-	Friendly Fleet	❌	❌	❌	❌	❌	❌	❌	❌	❌	✔️	
DD	Jervis Kai	-	Friendly Fleet	❌	❌	❌	❌	❌	❌	❌	❌	❌	✔️	Kai
DD	Janus	-	Friendly Fleet	❌	❌	❌	❌	❌	❌	❌	❌	❌	✔️	
BB	Iowa	-	Friendly Fleet	❌	❌	❌	❌	❌	❌	❌	❌	❌	✔️	
BB	South Dakota Kai	-	Friendly Fleet	❌	❌	❌	❌	❌	❌	❌	❌	❌	✔️	Kai
BB	Washington Kai	-	Friendly Fleet	❌	❌	❌	❌	❌	❌	❌	❌	❌	✔️	Kai
DD	Fletcher Kai	-	Friendly Fleet	❌	❌	❌	❌	❌	❌	❌	❌	❌	✔️	Kai
AR	Akashi	-	Ending	❌	❌	❌	❌	❌	❌	❌	❌	❌	✔️	
DD	Akatsuki	-	Ending	❌	❌	❌	❌	❌	❌	❌	❌	❌	✔️	
DD	Ikazuchi	-	Ending	❌	❌	❌	❌	❌	❌	❌	❌	❌	✔️	
DD	Inazuma	-	Ending	❌	❌	❌	❌	❌	❌	❌	❌	❌	✔️	
CLT	Ōi	-	Ending	❌	❌	❌	❌	❌	❌	❌	❌	❌	✔️	
BC	Hiei	-	Ending	❌	❌	❌	❌	❌	❌	❌	❌	❌	✔️	
BC	Kirishima	-	Ending	❌	❌	❌	❌	❌	❌	❌	❌	❌	✔️	
DD	Harusame	-	Ending	❌	❌	❌	❌	❌	❌	❌	❌	❌	✔️	
DD	Kawakaze Kai Ni	-	Ending	❌	❌	❌	❌	❌	❌	❌	❌	❌	✔️	Kai Ni
DD	Umikaze	-	Ending	❌	❌	❌	❌	❌	❌	❌	❌	❌	✔️	
DD	Yamakaze	-	Ending	❌	❌	❌	❌	❌	❌	❌	❌	❌	✔️	
DD	Suzukaze	-	Ending	❌	❌	❌	❌	❌	❌	❌	❌	❌	✔️	
DD	Samidare	-	Ending	❌	❌	❌	❌	❌	❌	❌	❌	❌	✔️	
AGB	Sōya	-	Ending	❌	❌	❌	❌	❌	❌	❌	❌	❌	✔️	The IRL ship

== Broadcast and distribution ==
The series is directed by Keizō Kusakawa, with the script written by Jukki Hanada, and features the voice cast from the original game. The show's premiere screening event took place at Shinjuku Piccadilly on December 27, 2014. The 12-episode series aired in Japan between January 8 and March 26, 2015, and was simulcast by Crunchyroll. The first Blu-ray and DVD compilation volumes were released on March 27, 2015. Funimation released the series in North America, on behalf of Crunchyroll. Madman Entertainment licensed the series in Australia and New Zealand. The opening theme song is "Miiro" (海色; "Ocean Color") performed by Akino from bless4, and the ending theme is "Fubuki" (吹雪; "Blizzard") by Shiena Nishizawa.

On January 4, 2019, it was announced that a new anime television series is in production. ENGI will animate the new anime, with Ultra Super Pictures handling production. The anime, subtitled Someday in that Sea (いつかあの海で, Itsuka Ano Umi de), is directed by Kazuya Miura, with scripts written by Kensuke Tanaka, the game's original writer, character designs handled by Chika Nomi, and music composed by Kaori Ohkoshi. It aired from November 4, 2022, to March 25, 2023, and ran for eight episodes.

=== Episode list ===
==== Kantai Collection: KanColle (1st anime) ====
No.	Title	Original release date
1	"Hello! Commander!"; Transliteration: "Hajimemashite! Shireikan!" (Japanese: 初めまして！司令官！)	January 8, 2015
Special Type Destroyer Fubuki arrives at the naval base as a newcomer to the Third Torpedo Squadron, where she is introduced by Mutsuki to the rest of her squadron. After an abrupt meeting and exchange of greetings with Akagi of the First Carrier Division during her flight drills, Fubuki spends recreational time with her new squad-mates. Meanwhile, the Fourth Fleet locates the base of the enemy Abyssal fleet, and the admiral orders a fleet assembled to commence an assault as the Fourth Fleet retreats. The First Carrier Task Force, Second Support Fleet and Third Torpedo Squadron are summarily sortied, however to the dismay of Fubuki's squadron, they learn that Fubuki has never engaged in battle before. The squadron encounters and engages a group of enemy destroyers, and just as Fubuki is close to being annihilated by one, the enemy group is destroyed by aircraft of the First Carrier Division.
2	"Without Dissent, Without Shame, Without Resentment!"; Transliteration: "Motorazu, Hajizu, Uramazu!" (Japanese: 悖らず、恥じず、憾まず！)	January 15, 2015
Fubuki has decided to become as strong as Akagi, so she can fight in the same fleet as her. Fubuki is then given a series of training sessions from other kanmusu; including but not limited to; balancing, target practice, and confidence boosting. Meanwhile, Akagi is having a target practice training session with Kaga supervising. During the school session, heavy cruiser Ashigara punishes Yūdachi for not doing her homework by giving her more homework. Ashigara then gives the destroyer a question about Type 93 Torpedoes only for Fubuki to whisper the answer in order to cheat, but Ashigara accepts the answer anyway. Ashigara then gives Fubuki a question about oxygen torpedoes, as the destroyer answers it correctly. It becomes clear that Fubuki has an excellent knowledge base, but has little in the way of practical skills. Not long after school, after many attempts of balancing training from Sendai, Fubuki decided to talk to Akagi at the hot springs only to run into the recently-repaired Atago instead. Fubuki would later attempt to smile with Naka as her trainer, much to her embarrassment, as she would later be sleepless and get sleepy the next day. Fubuki would later continue her balancing training with Sendai as night falls. The three light cruisers reveal they've been pushing Fubuki because Nagato said she would likely be transferred out of their fleet if she didn't improve. Fubuki's skills get better as she continues training, impressing Nagato enough to allow her to stay in the squadron.
3	"The Operation to Capture W Island!"; Transliteration: "U-Tō Kōryaku Sakusen!" (Japanese: W島攻略作戦！)	January 22, 2015
Fubuki's squadron, the Third Torpedo Squadron, and the Fourth Torpedo Squadron consisting of Yūbari, Kuma, Tama, Mochizuki, Yayoi, and Mutsuki's sister Kisaragi are sent to an operation to defeat an enemy torpedo squadron residing in W Island by luring them out at night. Fubuki becomes nervous about the operation as she is still not confident in her abilities. However her friends cheer her up and wishes her good luck in the operation, and in the morning, Fubuki meets Akagi during morning practice. Akagi gives Fubuki some inspiring advice as a Kanmusu, letting Fubuki gain more confidence in herself. The Third and Fourth Torpedo Squadron are sent to the operation during daytime in order to do reconnaissance over the enemy fleet until night time to initiate their mission. However their operation is put on halt when two enemy Nu-class Light Aircraft Carriers discover the location of Fubuki's squadron, forcing them to retreat and run away from the enemy torpedo squadron who starts chasing after them, while facing several Abyssal aircraft. Through the efforts of Fubuki's squadron, the Fourth Torpedo Squadron, and thanks to the reinforcements by the Second Fleet consisting of battleships Kongō, Hiei, Haruna, and Kirishima, who had arrived after an expedition, the enemy torpedo squadron is forced to retreat and the enemy Nu-class Light Aircraft Carriers are defeated. However, Kisaragi is hit by a bomber while patrolling alone and sinks beneath the waves.
4	"Now It's Our Turn! Follow Me!"; Transliteration: "Watashi-tachi no Deban ne! Forō mī!" (Japanese: 私たちの出番ネ！ Follow me!)	January 29, 2015
Mutsuki, who had grown fond of Kisaragi, remains in denial about her death, continuing to wait at the docks for her return. Whilst wondering how to go about helping her, Fubuki, along with destroyer Shimakaze, are assigned on a mission with the four Kongō sisters; Kongō, Hiei, Haruna, and Kirishima, to battle against the abyssal fleet in rainy conditions. On the day of the mission, Fubuki and the others have to find a way to bring out the wayward Shimakaze, who is eventually lured in by a tea party. During the mission, Fubuki's concerns over Mutsuki starts to overwhelm her, but Kongō saves her and calms her down before finishing off the enemy fleet. Upon returning home, Fubuki embraces Mutsuki, holding her tightly until she lets out all of her emotions over Kisaragi and finally accepts the loss.
5	"Don't Compare Me to the Girls in Carrier Group Five!"; Transliteration: "Gokōsen no Ko nanka to Issho ni Shinaide!" (Japanese: 五航戦の子なんかと一緒にしないで！)	February 5, 2015
The admiral announces a reorganization of the fleets, so Fubuki and the rest of the Third Torpedo Squadron spend their last night together, promising to continue their spirit in whatever fleet they end up in. Fubuki ends up in the Fifth Mobile Fleet along with Kongō, torpedo cruisers Kitakami and Ōi, and aircraft carriers Kaga and Zuikaku, quickly discovering that the latter two don't get along with each other since they are from different Carrier Groups. As Fubuki laments her experience, she learns from Akagi that the splits were made to prepare the girls for a counterattack mission against the Abyssals. With the unit arguing over who should be the flagship, the girls take turns being the flagship, each one turning out to be a failure due to their own selfishness. Just as Zuikaku contemplates asking the admiral to reassign the groups, the unit is launched to repel and attack by the Abyssals, with Fubuki calmly giving out orders before acting as a decoy, allowing the unit to defeat the enemy. Impressed by her ability to take command, the unit unanimously nominate Fubuki to be the flagship and start to get along with each other better.
6	"Destroyer Division Six and the Battle of Curry Seas!"; Transliteration: "Dai-Roku-Kuchikutai, Karē-yō Sakusen!" (Japanese: 第六駆逐隊、カレー洋作戦！)	February 12, 2015
The annual curry contest is announced, with the winning curry recipe to be used on the official menu. The Sixth Destroyer Division, consisting of Akatsuki, Hibiki, Ikazuchi and Inazuma, hope to win the contest in order to become proper ladies, but none of them have made curry before. Despite running into various mishaps in their attempts to successfully make curry, the group nonetheless remain determined. On the day of the contest, most of the competing teams end up knocking themselves out, leaving just Division Six against Ashigara and Haguro, who prove to be intimidating opponents. After judging both entries, Nagato judges Division Six's mild curry as the winner, for the reason that she cannot handle spicy foods.
7	"I Hate Carrier Group One!"; Transliteration: "Ikkōsen nante, Dai-kkkirai!" (Japanese: 一航戦なんて、大ッッキライ！)	February 19, 2015
During a skirmish against the Abyssal by Mobile Unit Five, Kaga gets damaged while protecting Zuikaku, who failed to notice a torpedo whilst trying to show Kaga up. With an important mission taking place the next day and no instant repairs available, Nagato assigns Shōkaku to take Kaga's place while she undergoes repairs, also sharing with Fubuki some concerns the Admiral has had concerning the Abyssals. During the mission, Fubuki, having learned that the Abyssals may be aware of their radio codes, has Shōkaku and Zuikaku send out recon planes to confirm her suspicions after the main fleet is attacked and light carrier Shoho is adrift due to hidden dive bombers. As Fubuki and the others engage and destroy one carrier fleet, Shōkaku and Zuikaku find themselves caught in an ambush by another carrier group lying in wait, unable to send out additional planes or contact the others with Shōkaku being badly damaged. Remembering Kaga's words, Zuikaku bets on the slim chance of hope by hiding in a nearby squall. Despite losing most of their planes, the two carriers manage to hold out until Fubuki and the others come to their aid and fend off the enemy, damaging the carrier and sinking the rest of its fleet, forcing it to retreat into the squall.
8	"I'm Not a Hotel!"; Transliteration: "Hoteru ja Arimasen!" (Japanese: ホテルじゃありませんっ！)	February 26, 2015
Following their battle, Fubuki's group arrive at Truk Island where the base for Operation FS is located, where they meet a battleship named Yamato, the fleet's most powerful warship who has never actually been out to sea. Recalling how she herself wasn't allowed into battle when she started out, Fubuki tries to get Yamato to go swimming with her, but is immediately shut down by Nagato. Later that night, Fubuki takes Yamato out in secret, but as soon as Yamato sets foot on the water, she becomes incredibly hungry. Nagato later explains that the reason Yamato isn't sent out is because of how much fuel and resources she consumes. Feeling guilty, Yamato helps Fubuki with her punishment for disobeying orders, where she admits she wants to go to sea and help the fleet more than anything. After getting some inspiration from Mutsuki and Yūdachi, Fubuki builds a raft so that they can take Yamato out onto the sea without using any of her resources. Along the way, they come across some Abyssal aircraft, which Yamato manages to destroy with her weapons, earning some slight praise from Nagato.
9	"Second Remodel-poi?!"; Transliteration: "Kai Ni-ppoi?!" (Japanese: 改二っぽい？！)	March 5, 2015
Yūdachi suddenly starts emitting a weird glow and is taken into the factory. When Fubuki and Mutsuki go to visit her, they discover Yūdachi has been 'remodeled' into a completely different person with new equipment as a result of her experience. Later that night, Yūdachi learns she is being transferred to Carrier Group One, while Fubuki is informed that Mobile Unit Five is being disbanded and she is being sent back to the Naval District. She is distraught, until she watches Yūdachi training with her new gear and learns that the other destroyer girls have been looking up to Fubuki as a role-model and giving them the drive to work harder. While Fubuki and her escorts sail to the Naval District, a familiar one eyed Wo-class carrier sends out an attack wing of fighter/bombers to attack the base. While no ships are lost in the attack, the commander ends up missing as he stays behind to ensure everyone else is safe. After the fleet girls work together to rebuild the facility, Nagato announces that, per the Admiral's final orders before his disappearance, that Fubuki is to be remodeled.
10	"Let's Do Our Best!"; Transliteration: "Ganbatte Ikimashō!" (Japanese: 頑張っていきましょー！)	March 12, 2015
As Nagato and the other command girls try to determine from the Admiral's orders where the Abyssal base is, Fubuki ups her training in the hopes of gaining the necessary requirements to be remodeled, leaving Mutsuki downhearted as she gets to spend less time with her. When Fubuki and the reformed Third Torpedo Squadron encounter the Abyssals during a scouting mission, Fubuki rushes in hoping to increase her experience while taking heavy damage in the process, barely making it out alive. When she wakes up in the docks, she is scolded by Mutstuki, who does not want to lose her like she lost Kisaragi. Later that night Fubuki finds her and apologizes, telling her about when she first met the commander and the words he told her shortly after she arrived which inspired her to pursue her own dream of helping everyone which is witnessed by Akagi and Kaga. The next day, as Akagi requests Fubuki to escort her during her next mission, but Kaga decides to test Fubuki to see if she is worthy by pitting her against their planes. Despite struggling a lot and taking severe damage, Fubuki receives encouragement from both Akagi and Mutsuki and passes the test earning the right to become remodeled, though her remodel isn't too different from her previous one (compared to Yūdachi). Afterwards Nagato declares MI base the next target for the fleets counterattack.
11	"Operation MI Begins!"; Transliteration: "Emu Ai Sakusen! Hatsudō!" (Japanese: MI作戦！発動！)	March 19, 2015
After Akagi has a nightmare in which her fleet is totally defeated during the operation, she asks Nagato to change the operation protocol, hoping to prevent the disaster she feels will be waiting for them. Shortly afterwards Nagato announces the battle fleet, including Carrier Groups One and Two, Kongō and Hiei, Fubuki, Yūdachi, and Kitakami, is to meet Yamato and other ships to attack MI with a second fleet doing a feint on a smaller base. Fubuki, Yūdachi, and Mutsuki meet and promise to come back safely, while Mutsu tries to comfort Nagato, who is doubting the mission. As the mission begins, Akagi decides to leave Kongō and Fubuki to wait for the others while the carriers begin the attack. They discover an Airfield Princess and launch a surprise attack, severely damaging her, but as they get ready for the second wave, the one eyed Wo-class carrier launches its own surprise attack with two Nu-class carriers, several destroyers and a torpedo cruiser and a light cruiser. With her bow destroyed and her teammates taking heavy damage, Akagi, feeling that she had failed to change fate, remains motionless as a bomber heads towards her.
12	"Enemy Planes Dive-Bombing From Above!"; Transliteration: "Tekki Chokujō, Kyūkōka!" (Japanese: 敵機直上、急降下！)	March 26, 2015
Fubuki arrives in time to save Akagi, shortly thereafter joined by Kongou, Yamato's Fleet, and a large number of reinforcements, helping the fleet get back on the offensive. After Akagi and Kaga receive extra ammunition from Zuikaku and Shokaku and disable the Airfield Princess' runway, Yamato uses her firepower to defeat her and destroy the base. As another Abyssal fleet appears, Yamato explains there is some strange power making events of the past repeat itself, which is made evident as the Airfield Princess regenerates herself and grows stronger. The group are assisted by the arrival of Nagato, who arrives with the entire fleet after having determined the true meaning behind the Admiral's plans, but still find themselves unable to prevent the Airfield Princess, now the Midway Princess, from regenerating. However, they are joined by the armored carrier Taihou, who was sent out by the safely returned Admiral, while Fubuki defeats the remaining Wo-class carrier, putting an end to the Airfield Princess' regeneration and leading to her defeat. With all the ships returning safely to the Naval District, Fubuki is once again greeted by the Admiral.

==== KanColle: Someday in that Sea (2nd anime) ====
No.	Title	Original release date
1	"Sortie Day"; Transliteration: "Shutsugeki no Hi" (Japanese: 出撃の日)	November 4, 2022
The war against the Abyssals has taken a turn for the worse, and the fleet's numbers have now been drastically diminished from heavy casualties. Japanese destroyer Shigure is transferred to the 1st Striking Force, 3rd Section along with battleships Yamashiro and Fusou, aviation cruiser Mogami, and destroyers Yamagumo, Asagumo, and Michishio. However, Yamashiro reveals that the 3rd Section is simply a sacrificial diversionary force for the upcoming operation, so they are expected to be sent on a suicide mission to distract the Abyssals. On the day of the operation, Yamashiro gifts one of her hair decorations to Shigure and personally asks her to protect Fusou at all costs. The 3rd Section then charges into the Surigao Strait.
2	"Into the Strait"; Transliteration: "Kaikyō e" (Japanese: 海峡へ)	November 11, 2022
The 3rd Section enters the Surigao Strait, and Mogami's scout planes spot a number of PT Imps lying in ambush. The group suddenly comes under air attack, and while they are able to repel the enemy fighters, both Shigure and Fusou suffer minor damage. As night falls, the 3rd Section continues pressing further into the strait. Shigure stays behind with the battleships while Mogami leads the rest of the destroyers to flush out the PT Imps. However, while Mogami's unit is preoccupied, Shigure and the battleships are ambushed by another group of PT Imps. Shigure does her best to defend Fusou but is quickly overwhelmed by the enemy numbers until Mogami's group returns in the nick of time to finish them off. Encouraged by how well the mission is going, the 3rd Section continues further into the strait. Meanwhile, the 2nd Striking Force begins their own advance, while a massive Abyssal fleet lies in wait on the other side of the strait.
3	"Night Battle in the Strait"; Transliteration: "Kaikyō Yasen" (Japanese: 海峡夜戦)	November 18, 2022
The 3rd Section continues further into the strait, where they encounter heavier Abyssal resistance. During one skirmish, Fusou is hit by torpedoes and is heavily damaged, but she refuses to retreat. With no other choice, Yamashiro orders the 3rd Section to continue pressing forward. However, they finally make contact with the main Abyssal fleet and are quickly overwhelmed as they begin taking heavy damage. Fortunately, they are saved by the timely arrival of the 2nd Striking Force led by Ashigara. Despite the additional reinforcements, the shipgirls are again overwhelmed when the twin Abyssal Night Strait Princesses enter the battle. At that moment, the rest of the 1st Striking Force arrives and ambushes the Night Strait Princesses, killing one of them. Yamashiro and Shigure work together to finish off the remaining Night Strait Princess and the resulting explosions leaves Yamashiro's fate unknown.
4	"Sasebo"; Transliteration: "Sasebo" (Japanese: 佐世保)	December 16, 2022
Shigure awakens at the Sasebo Naval Base, still recovering from the damage she suffered in the Surigao Strait. However, she finds out that while the rest of the 3rd Section survived, all members except her and Mogami were forced to retire as shipgirls due to having taken too much damage from the battle. She is able to have one last meeting with Fusou and Yamashiro before they leave the base, and receives a gift from them. She then meets the Admiral, who tells her that the 3rd Section has been disbanded and she will be transferred to Torpedo Squadron 2 after she recovers from her injuries. While taking leave time at a hot spring, she encounters Yukikaze and quickly befriends her. The next day, Shigure and Yukikaze return to Sasebo to the meet the rest of Torpedo Squadron 2, led by the cruiser Yahagi.
5	"Torpedo Squadron 2"; Transliteration: "Nisuisen" (Japanese: 二水戦)	December 23, 2022
Yahagi reviews Torpedo Squadron 2's roster, as well as Yamashiro's after action report for the battle in Surigao Strait and determines that Japan can still fight on. The next day, Shigure has breakfast with Hamakaze and Isokaze, who mention that their greatest fear is not being sunk, but being sunk and forgotten, and put their trust in Shigure to remember their exploits. Yahagi then summons Torpedo Squadron 2 and announces a full scale training exercise where she and Ooyodo will lead a Red Fleet while most of Torpedo Squadron 2, will be Blue Fleet whose objective is to destroy Red Fleet. During the exercise, Blue Fleet pursues Red Fleet, but are caught off guard by surprise reinforcements in the form of planes and submarines. Despite this, Shigure and Yukikaze are able to break through and engage Yahagi directly. After the conclusion of the exercise, Yahagi ponders the future of Torpedo Squadron 2.
6	"Dark Clouds"; Transliteration: "An'un" (Japanese: 暗雲)	January 20, 2023
The navy begins sending out convoys to Singapore to collect badly needed supplies, and the destroyers of Torpedo Squadron 2 are assigned to various escort duties. Shigure is glad to see one of her friends, the carrier Ryuuhou, has returned to Sasebo. Ryuuhou tells her that she has been assigned a mission to transport brand new fighter planes to Taiwan to bolster the island's defenses. Shigure, Isokaze, Hamakaze, and Yukikaze are assigned to escort Ryuuhou, but Yukikaze falls ill and is unable to participate in the mission. Despite being one destroyer short, the convoy decides to head out anyways. En route to Taiwan, the convoy sails into a rainstorm where they are ambushed by multiple Abyssal submarines. The destroyers are able to repel the first few waves of attacks, but eventually run out of depth charges. At that moment, a squadron of coastal defense shipgirls arrives and eliminates the remaining submarines, clearing the path for the convoy.
7	"Naval Interception Mission"; Transliteration: "Kaijō Yūgekisen" (Japanese: 海上遊撃戦)	February 12, 2023
Torpedo Squadron 2 is assigned to perform a naval interception mission to ambush an Abyssal supply fleet mean to support a massive Abyssal battle fleet. Thanks to a successful supply run performed by another fleet, the naval base a Kure has gathered enough oil to deploy Yamato, who they intend to use to engage the Abyssal fleet. However, the Admiral decides to hold back Shigure, instead arranging her to go through her Kai San upgrade. As Torpedo Squadron 2 departs, Shigure enters the upgrade chamber and recalls of her experiences in battle and with her friends as her new form takes shape. Torpedo Squadron 2 returns from their mission after a successful strike, with only light damage on some of the destroyers. As they great ready to go out for a second interception, Shigure's upgrade is completed and she rejoins Torpedo Squadron 2 on the attack.
8	"See You Again on Another Quiet Blue Sea"; Transliteration: "Itsuka Ano Umi de" (Japanese: いつかあの海で)	March 25, 2023
The Abyssals commence their invasion of the Nansei Islands, forcing the navy to mobilize to stop them. Japan's remaining carriers are sent out as a diversionary force to lure the main fleet away while Torpedo Squadron 2 and Yamato attack the Abyssal supply fleet. They manage to destroy the supply fleet, but are ambushed by the main Abyssal fleet which inflicts heavy damage on them. The timely arrival of shipgirls from the US Navy and Royal Navy give Torpedo Squadron 2 the opportunity to regroup and charge the main Abyssal fleet, but many of them are gunned down and sunk in the process. Only Shigure and Yukikaze make it through the defense and sink the Abyssal carriers before Shigure herself is sunk. As she sinks, Shigure wishes to meet her friends again on "another quiet blue sea". Many years later in modern times, all of the shipgirls have been reincarnated as normal girls living peaceful lives now that the Abyssal threat is gone, including Shigure.

== Reception ==
The first volume of the anime ranked second place within Oricon's weekly anime Blu-ray sales charts during its first week of release, selling 16,789 units and trailing behind the limited edition Blu-ray boxset of Fate/stay night: Unlimited Blade Works; the same volume also placed third within the anime DVD sales charts, with 3,184 units sold.

Jonathan Gad of Vice said that the Kantai Collection anime television series is historically revisionist, criticising the show's depiction of the Japanese protagonists being victorious in the Battle of Midway.

Timothy Blake Donohoo of Comic Book Resources said that despite the series being historically revisionist, it is the historical World War II aspect of Kantai Collection that is likely the main draw for its fans.
