= Uchiage Hanabi =

Single by Daoko feat. Kenshi Yonezu

from the album Thank You Blue
- Language: Japanese
- B-side: "Forever Friends"; "Cinderella Step"
- Released: August 9, 2017
- Recorded: 2017
- Studio: Aobadai Studio Inc. (Meguro, Tokyo, Japan); aLIVE Recording (Setagaya, Tokyo, Japan); Sound City (Minato, Tokyo, Japan)
- Genre: J-pop
- Label: Toy's Factory
- Producer: Kenshi Yonezu

Music video
- "打上花火" on YouTube

Alternative cover
- First press limited edition front cover

"Uchiage Hanabi" (Japanese: 打上花火; English title: "Fireworks") is a song by Daoko featuring Kenshi Yonezu released in August 2017. "Uchiage Hanabi" means "launching fireworks". The song is used for the 2017 anime film Fireworks and the album Thank You Blue. There are two solo versions, Yonezu's solo version released for Bootleg for minimalist rearrangement, and Daoko's solo version for Shiteki Ryoko. It ranked number one in Billboard Japan Hot Animation for 25 weeks. It won Song of the Year of Space Shower Music Awards in 2018.

== Reception ==
The song received many positive reviews, and was described as merging the light sadness of summer and floweriness of fireworks, mixing delicate piano and strings with an electro effect and producing a beautiful scene. The music video for the song has garnered over 700 million views on YouTube.

== Track listing ==
Uchiage Hanabi standard edition
No.	Title	Writer(s)	Artist	Length
1.	"Uchiage Hanabi (打上花火) (Note: Anime film Fireworks theme song)"	Kenshi Yonezu	Daoko, Yonezu	4:49
2.	"Forever Friends (Note: Anime film Fireworks insert song)"	Remedios	Daoko	4:08
3.	"Cinderella Step (Note: TV anime Rage of Bahamut: Virgin Soul 2nd ending theme)"	Daoko	Daoko	4:02
Total length:				12:59

Uchiage Hanabi first press limited edition – disc 1 CD
No.	Title	Writer(s)	Artist	Length
1.	"Uchiage Hanabi (打上花火)"	Yonezu	Daoko, Yonezu	4:49
2.	"Forever Friends"	Remedios	Daoko	4:08
Total length:				8:57

Uchiage Hanabi first press limited edition – disc 2 DVD
No.	Title	Lyrics	Music	Length
1.	"Intro"			1:11
2.	"JK (Note: live recording of Daoko 2016 tour "Aoiro Jidai" (青色主義) at Akasaka Blitz)"	Daoko	Daoko, Ray Kunimoto	3:43
3.	"Takai Kabe ni wa Ikusen no Doa (高い壁には幾千のドア)"	Daoko	Daoko, Akito Bros.	4:46
4.	"Kakete Ageru (かけてあげる)"	Daoko	Daoko, Hideya Kojima from Oresama	4:22
5.	"Myūjikku (ミュージック)"	Daoko	Daoko, Parkgolf	3:58
6.	"Boku (ぼく)"	Daoko	Daoko, Kojima	5:10
7.	"Fashion"	Daoko	Daoko, 岩崎太整	3:25
8.	"Suisei (水星)"	Daoko, Onomatope Daijin, Tofubeats	Tofubeats	4:19
9.	"Kimi (きみ)"	Daoko	Daoko	4:41
10.	"Boy"	Daoko	Daoko	4:08
11.	"Fog"	Daoko	Daoko	4:26
12.	"Interlude"			2:37
13.	"Daisuki (ダイスキ)" (with TeddyLoid)	Daoko	Daoko, TeddyLoid	3:54
14.	"Samishii Kamisama (さみしいかみさま)"	Daoko	Daoko, Kojima	4:03
15.	"Me!Me!Me!" (featuring Daoko_pt.1)	Daoko	Daoko, TeddyLoid	2:25
16.	"ShibuyaK"	Daoko	Daoko, Kojima	8:20
17.	"Moshimo Bokura ga Game no Shuyaku de (もしも僕らがGAMEの主役で)"	Daoko	Daoko, Kojima	4:25
18.	"Bang! (EN)"	Daoko	Daoko, Kojima	5:12
19.	"Outro"			3:13
Total length:				78:18

== Personnel ==
Credits adapted from the CD liner notes

- Kenshi Yonezu – music (track 1), lyrics (track 1), producer (track 1) arrangement (track 1), vocals (track 1),
- Daoko – vocals (tracks 1–3), composer (track 3), lyrics (track 3)
- Hayato Tanaka – arrangement (track 1)
- Youhei Makabe – guitar (track 1)
- Masaki Hori – drums (track 1)
- Hiroaki Yokoyama – piano (track 1)
- Koichiro Muroya – strings (track 1)
- Yoshio Arimatsu – drum technician (track 1)
- Remedios – music (track 2), lyrics (track 2)
- Satoru Kosaki – arrangement (track 2)
- Hitoshi Konno – strings (track 2)
- Takato Saijo – horn (track 2)
- Yu Kumai – horn (track 2)
- Hitoshi Watanabe – bass (track 2)
- Masahiro Itami – guitar (track 2)
- Satoru Kosaki – piano (track 2), programming (track 2)
- Yuri Misumi – sound coordinate (track 2)
- Kazuo Sudo – sound coordinate (track 2)
- Keiichi Ejima – arrangement (track 3)
- Masashi Uramoto – recording (track 3), mixing (track 3)
- Keiji Kondo – recording (track 3), Pro Tools operation (track 3)
- Tetsuro Sawamoto – assistant
- Masayuki Yoshii – assistant
- Ted Jensen – mastering (all tracks)
- Genki Kawamura – executive producer

== Charts ==
=== Weekly charts ===
Chart (2017)	Peak position
Japan (Oricon)	9
Japan (Japan Hot 100)	1

=== Year-end charts ===
Chart (2017)	Position
Japan Hot 100	3
Japan Hot Animation (Billboard)	1

Chart (2018)	Position
Japan Hot 100	4
Japan Hot Animation (Billboard)	1

Chart (2019)	Position
Japan Hot 100	21
Japan Hot Animation (Billboard)	2

Chart (2020)	Position
Japan Hot 100	75
Japan Hot Animation (Billboard)	9

=== All-time charts ===
Chart (2008–2022)	Position
Japan (Japan Hot 100)	13

== Certifications ==
Region	Certification	Certified units/sales
Japan (RIAJ)	2× Platinum	500,000^{*}
Streaming
Japan (RIAJ)	3× Platinum	300,000,000^{†}
^{*} Sales figures based on certification alone.^{†} Streaming-only figures based on certification alone.

== Accolades ==
Year	Award	Category	Result
2018	32nd Japan Gold Disc Award	Song of the Year by Download	Won
2018	Space Shower Music Awards	Song of the Year	Won
