= Airi (singer) =

Japanese singer signed to Lantis (born 1994)

AiRI
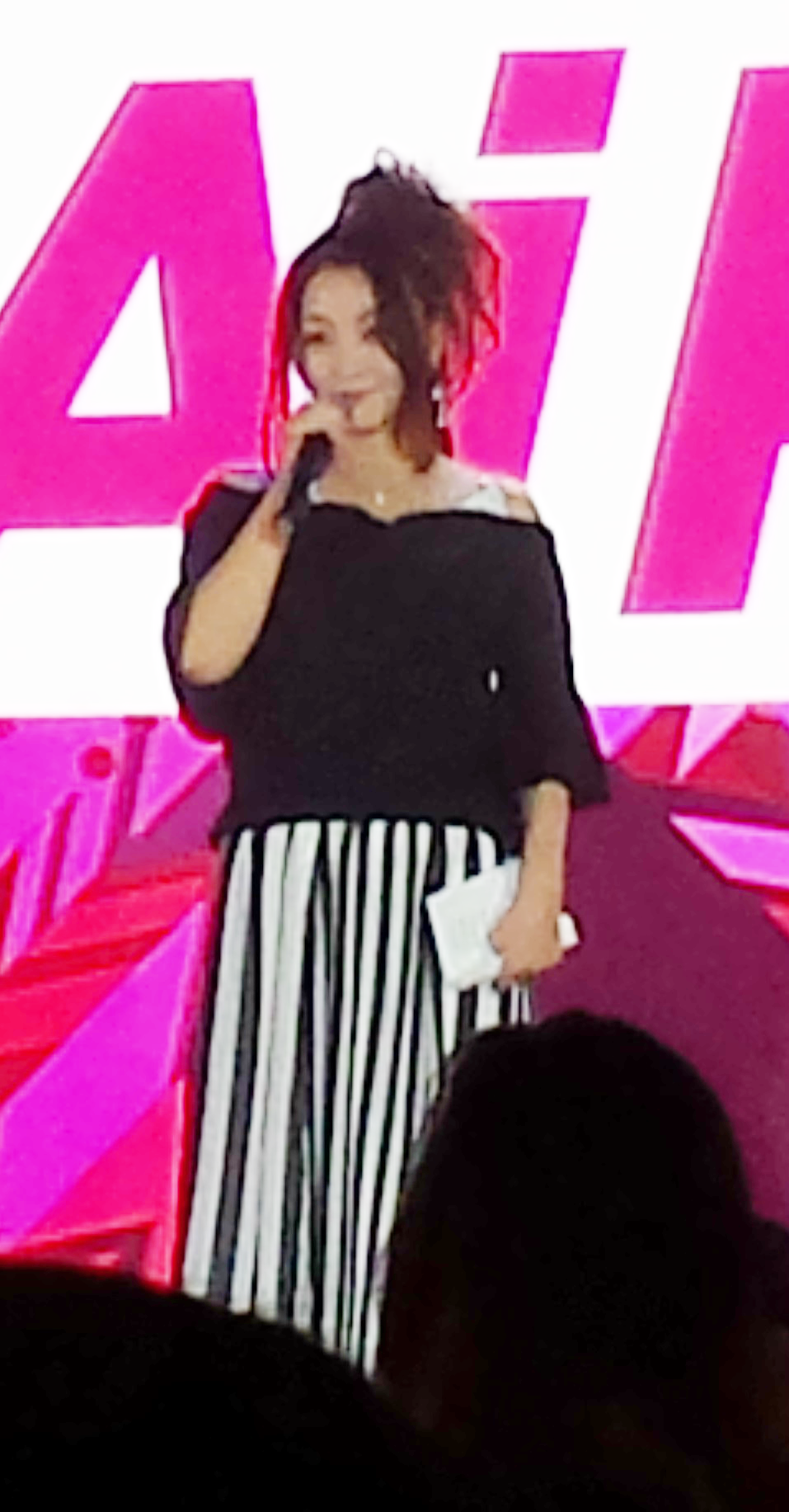
- AiRI at Cosplay Mania 2018

Background information
- Also known as: UR@N
- Born: September 13; Japan
- Genres: J-pop
- Occupation: Singer
- Years active: 1999–present
- Label: Lantis
- Website: www.airi-hightone.net

AiRI (born September 13) (previously known under the stage name UR@N) is a Japanese singer signed to Lantis. She is best known for performing "Dreamer", the opening theme to the anime Tari Tari, and the song "Dream Scramble", which is used as the opening theme to the anime Keijo.

== Discography ==
=== Albums ===
- Puzzle (2012) - Oricon peak at #77
- Color (2013) - Oricon peak at #60
- Mirage (2014) - Oricon peak at #69
- Smash!!! (mini album; 2015) - Oricon peak at #140

=== Singles ===
- "Learn Together" (2011) - Oricon peak at #92
- "Unmei/ Futatsu no Ashiato（運命 / 二人の足跡)" (2011) - Oricon peak at #83
- "Pieces" (2011) - Oricon peak at #34
- "Kimi to Boku wa Soko ni ita (君と僕はそこにいた" (2012)
- "Dreamer" (2012) - Oricon peak at #21
- "Imagination > Reality" (2013) - Oricon peak at #83
- "DREAMxSCRAMBLE" (2016) - Oricon peak at #119
