= Shiena Nishizawa =

Japanese singer

Shiena Nishizawa 西沢 幸奏
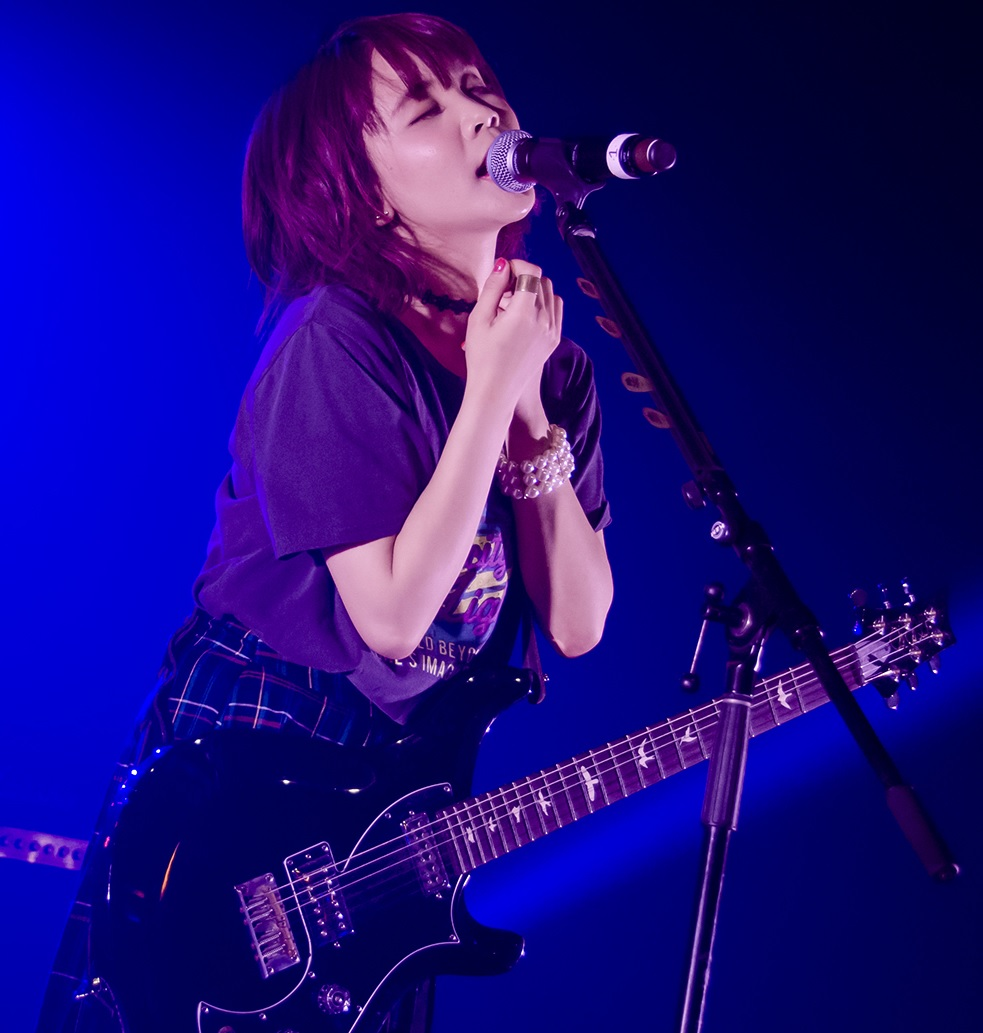
- Nishizawa at Otakuthon 2018

Background information
- Born: Shiena Nishizawa (西澤 幸奏, Nishizawa Shiena); February 23, 1997 (age 29); Saitama, Japan
- Genre: Pop rock
- Occupations: Singer, lyricist
- Years active: 2015–present
- Labels: FlyingDog (2015–2019); Sacra Music (2019–2023)
- Website: exina.jp

Shiena Nishizawa (西沢 幸奏, Nishizawa Shiena; born February 23, 1997), also known by her stage name Exina (stylized as EXiNA), is a Japanese pop rock singer from Saitama, signed to Sacra Music under Sony Music Entertainment. She won the Grand Prix in the first FlyingDog Audition in 2014. She released her debut single "Fubuki" in 2015, and her first album Break Your Fate in 2017.

Nishizawa's music was influenced by her father, as well as artists such as Dave Grohl. Her songs have been featured in anime series such as Kantai Collection and The Asterisk War. She has also appeared at anime events in Europe and Asia. In April 2017, she opened her official fanclub Face to Face. In July 2019, she began to use her new stage name Exina, and she moved to Sacra Music under Sony Music Entertainment.

== Early life and education ==
Nishizawa was born in Saitama Prefecture on February 23, 1997. Although she had some interest in music since she was a child, in junior high school, she became interested in pursuing a music career after receiving a guitar her father had used. In 2014 while still in high school, she won the Grand Prix in the first FlyingDog Audition, beating 3,000 other candidates.

== Career ==
She released her debut single "Fubuki" (吹雪, Snow Storm) on February 18, 2015; the song is used as the closing theme to the 2015 anime series Kantai Collection aka KanColle. She then appeared at Animelo Summer Live in August 2015. Her second single "Brand-new World / Piacere" (ピアチェーレ) was released on November 11, 2015; "Brand-new World" is used as the first opening theme to the 2015 anime series The Asterisk War, while "Piacere" is used as the closing theme for the original video animation (OVA) Aria the Avvenire. Nishizawa made her first overseas appearance in Düsseldorf, Germany, at the DoKomi anime convention in April 2016. Her third single "The Asterisk War" was released on May 25, 2016; the song is used as the second opening theme to The Asterisk War. Nishizawa's fourth single "Kikan" (帰還, Return) was released on November 23, 2016; the song is used as the theme song to KanColle: The Movie.

Nishizawa's debut album Break Your Fate was released on March 15, 2017. Her official fanclub, named Face to Face, opened in April 2017. She appeared at Anime Festival Asia Indonesia in August 2017, Cosplay Mania in the Philippines in October 2017, Anime Festival Asia Singapore in November 2017, and C3 AFA Hong Kong on February 11, 2018. Her fifth single "Love Men Holic" was released on February 21, 2018; the song is used as the closing theme to the 2018 anime series Ms. Koizumi Loves Ramen Noodles. Nishizawa's digital single "Meteor / New Generation" was released on June 27, 2018; both songs are used as insert songs in the 2018 anime series Last Hope. In June 2018, after returning to Singapore in June 2018 for the Natsu Rock concert event, Nishizawa made an appearance at Penang Anime Matsuri in Malaysia in July 2018, and at Otakuthon in Montreal, Canada in August 2018. She returned to AFA Singapore in December 2018.

On July 9, 2019, she began to use her new stage name Exina, and she moved to the Sacra Music record label under Sony Music Entertainment Japan. Her first mini album under her new stage name, XiX, was released on August 21, 2019.

She released the single "Divine" in May 2021; the title song was used as the opening theme to the anime series Blue Reflection Ray. She released the single "Ending Mirage" in February 2022; the title song was used as the ending theme to the anime series World's End Harem. In 2023, she announced she was putting the Exina solo project on indefinite hiatus, with her resuming music activities as Shiena Nishizawa later that year.

== Musical style and influences ==
Nishizawa's music style focuses on rock, and she lists artists such as Dave Grohl of the Foo Fighters as her musical inspirations. Her love of music was also influenced by her father, who owned a guitar and was the first to teach her how to play music.

In interviews with Anican and Animate Times, Nishizawa related the production of "Fubuki", her first single. The single began as a demo recorded shortly after she won her audition. The demo had no title and different lyrics, and at the time of her audition, it had yet to be decided that she was to sing the song for Kantai Collection. She mentioned that she was not familiar with the series before making the single, and that she felt pressured about debuting in a franchise that was very popular. After the release of the single, she was "filled with emotions" and was determined to start writing her own songs, as "Fubuki" was not written by her.

The production of Nishizawa's second single "Brand New World" was discussed in an interview with Newtype. She relates how she wanted to challenge herself by writing the lyrics to the title track. She used as influences the relationship of the characters Ayato and Julis from The Asterisk War, particularly their "feelings of emotion". She used lyrics such as "bloom powerfully" to convey a message of "pushing through even when feeling the sense of pain". For the single's B-side "Piacere", she wanted the song to relate to Aria the Avvenire depicting a generational change, and to express the feelings of kindness, pleasure, and sadness.

In an interview with Akiba Souken, Nishizawa described the production of her first album Break Your Fate. The album revolved around the theme of "fate", particularly on the feeling of "fighting one's self". She described the feeling of fate being created by the mind as weakness, that a person would then need to fight. For the album's second track "Shark", she wanted to express the impression of sharks as "scary and dangerous" creatures that need to swim to breathe. The song features a long English phrase as she wanted to "do expressions that she had never done before". The song "Gemini" is meant to represent a fantasy world, while the song "Feel This Moment" was meant to serve as her anthem for her live performances.

Nishizawa related to Animate Times and Akiba Souken the production of her fifth single "Love Men Holic". Since the song was to be used as the ending theme to the anime series Ms. Koizumi Loves Ramen Noodles, she wanted to write a love song that would use ramen-related words as puns in the lyrics. An example is the song's title, with "Love Men" being a take on the word "ramen", while she also used the lyrics "show you" as a pun on shōyu (醤油), the Japanese word for soy sauce. One influence in the song is the personality of the series' main character Koizumi, who Nishizawa describes as not "putting emotions on the table", thus inspiring the use of salt-related terms in the lyrics.

== Discography ==
=== As Shiena Nishizawa ===
==== Studio albums ====
List of albums, with selected chart positions
Title	Album details	Peak positions
Title	Album details	JPN
Break Your Fate	Released: March 15, 2017 (JPN); Label: Victor Entertainment; Formats: CD, CD+DVD	16

==== Singles ====
List of singles, with selected chart positions
Title	Year	Peak chart positions		Album
Title	Year	JPN Oricon	JPN Hot 100	Album
"Fubuki"	2015	6	3	Break Your Fate
"Brand-new World"	2015	24	36	Break Your Fate
"Piacere" (Note: Piachēre (ピアチェーレ))	2015	24	36	Break Your Fate
"The Asterisk War"	2016	30	24	Break Your Fate
"Kikan"	2016	29	50	Break Your Fate
"Love Men Holic"	2018	48	96	Non-album singles
"Meteor/New Generation"	2018	—	—	Non-album singles
"—" denotes releases that were ineligible to chart.

==== Music videos ====
List of music videos
Title	Year	Director(s)
"Fubuki"	2015	Hidenobu Tanabe
"Brand-new World"	2015	Kouji Fujita
"The Asterisk War"	2016	
"Kikan"	2016	
"Break your fate"	2017	
"Love Men Holic"	2018	

=== As Exina ===
==== Studio albums ====
List of albums, with selected chart positions
Title	Album details	Peak positions
Title	Album details	JPN
SHiENA	Released: May 18, 2022 (JPN); Label: Sacra Music; Formats: CD, CD+DVD	138

==== Mini albums ====
List of albums, with selected chart positions
Title	Album details	Peak positions
Title	Album details	JPN
XiX	Released: August 21, 2019 (JPN); Label: Sacra Music; Formats: CD, CD+DVD	137

==== Singles ====
List of singles, with selected chart positions
Title	Year	Peak chart positions		Album
Title	Year	JPN Oricon	JPN Hot 100	Album
"Divine"	2021	57	—	SHiENA
"Ending Mirage"	2022	54	—	SHiENA
"—" denotes releases that were ineligible to chart.

==== Digital singles ====
List of digital singles, with selected chart positions
Title	Year	Peak chart positions		Album
Title	Year	JPN Oricon	JPN Hot 100	Album
"EQ"	2019	—	—	XiX
"Katana"	2019	—	—	XiX
"Overthinking Boy"	2019	—	—	XiX
"Jesus Knows"	2019	—	—	XiX
"Babel"	2019	—	—	XiX
"Dear Junks"	2021	—	—	Non-album singles
"Erica"	2021	—	—	Non-album singles
"—" denotes releases that were ineligible to chart.

==== Music videos ====
List of music videos
Title	Year	Director(s)
"EQ"	2019	—
"Katana"	2019	—
"Overthinking Boy"	2019	—
"Berserk"	2019	—
"Neon"	2019	—
"Period"	2019	—
"Jesus Knows"	2019	—
"Babel"	2019	—
"Dear Junks"	2021	—
"Erica"	2021	—
"Divine"	2021	—
"Ending Mirage"	2022	—
