= Last Hope (TV series) =

Japanese anime television series

- Cover of the prequel manga's 1st Tankobon volume

重神機パンドーラ 重神机潘多拉 (Jūshinki Pandōra / Zhòng Shénjī Pānduōlā)
- Genre: Mecha
- Created by: Shōji Kawamori; Satelight
- Manga

Jūshinki no Pandora 0
- Written by: Ageha Saotome
- Published by: Kodansha; Pixiv
- Original run: March 22, 2018 – present
- Anime television series
- Directed by: Shōji Kawamori (Note: Credited as Chief Director (総監督, Sō Kantoku)); Hidekazu Satō
- Produced by: Yasuhiro Uema; Hiroyuki Aoi
- Written by: Toshizō Nemoto
- Music by: Akihiro Manabe; Masahiro Tokuda
- Studio: Satelight
- Licensed by: Netflix
- Original network: Tokyo MX, WOWOW, BS11, MBS
- Original run: April 4, 2018 – September 26, 2018
- Episodes: 26
- Manga

Pandora Men's Dining
- Written by: Natsu Mizuno
- Published by: Kodansha
- Magazine: Shōnen Magazine Edge
- Original run: April 17, 2018 – October 17, 2018
- Light novel

Jūshinki Pandōra -Before Pandora-
- Written by: Edotarou
- Published by: Media Factory
- Imprint: Novel 0
- Published: May 15, 2018

Last Hope, also named Unit Pandora (Chinese: 重神机潘多拉; Japanese: 重神機パンドーラ), is a Japanese-Chinese anime television series produced and animated by Satelight. It is created and directed by Shōji Kawamori alongside Hidekazu Sato and written by Toshizo Nemoto. It premiered online in Netflix in Japan on March 29, 2018, with a local televised broadcast on Tokyo MX and other stations including MBS TV on April 4, 2018. A worldwide release through Netflix went online on September 15, 2018.

== Plot ==
The series takes place in the year 2038, seven years after the Xianglong Crisis when a quantum reactor exploded and caused a chain reaction that destroyed civilization. It also spurred a rapid evolutionary process that turned most animals into bio-mechanical creatures called BRAI (Biological Revolutionary of Accelerated Intellect), that gradually become a threat to humanity as the city of Neo-Xianglong establish the creation of MOEV (Multi-purpose Organic Evolution Vehicle) mecha to fend off the BRAI. Leon Lau, a scientist previously exiled from Neo-Xianglong for his role in the Xianglong Crisis, provides a stable quantum reactor called the Hyper Drive to enable the MOEV of the established Pandora Unit to combat a series of BRAI that are being enhanced by a similar device created by the mysterious Sieg.

== Characters ==
Leon Lau (レオン・ラウ, Reon Rau)
Voiced by: Tomoaki Maeno (Japanese); Robbie Daymond (English)
A brilliant yet eccentric scientist under Lon Woo who was a central figure in the Xianglong Crisis, spending five years in the wilderness in exile outside Neo Xianglong before being allowed to return as a member of the Pandora Unit.
Chloe Lau (クロエ・ラウ, Kuroe Rau)
Voiced by: Nao Tōyama (Japanese); Xanthe Huynh (English)
Her real name Chloe Woo (クロエ・ウー, Kuroe Ū), she was adopted by Leon as his "little sister" after her brother died and followed him in his banishment from Neo Xianglong. Although they are not related by blood, she thinks of Leon like a big brother while establishing rules in their family contract to keep him in line.
Doug Horvat (ダグ・ホーバット, Dagu Hōbatto)
Voiced by: Kenjiro Tsuda (Japanese); Kyle Hebert (English)
A sniper who loves women and cats, Doug was finishing an assignment in Xianglong when the "Xianglong Crisis" struck and turned his life into a tragedy. Seven years later, Doug works as a bounty hunter before being hired to join the Pandora Unit. Although he is a friendly and talkative "mood-maker", when looking down the scope of his rifle, Doug has the cold eyes of a beast which played in his code name "Eye of the Tiger".
Queenie Yoh (クイニー・ヨウ, Kuinī Yō)
Voiced by: Kana Hanazawa (Japanese); Laura Post (English)
Having lost her parents at a young age, Queenie Yoh was adopted by the master of dojo in the mountains where she trained in the "Sky God Fist" style of martial arts. Following the "Xianglong Crisis" struck, Queenie was unable to prevent Hao Wang from murdering their master and fellow students, having since become a bounty hunter to track him down before joining the Pandora Unit.
Gren Din (グレン・ディン, Guren Din)
Voiced by: Yūma Uchida (Japanese); Ben Pronsky (English)
Gren Din is one of the main character in Last Hope. He is also a member of the special unit Pandora.
Cain Ibrahim Hasan (ケイン・イブラヒーム・ハサン, Kein Iburahīmu Hasan)
Voiced by: Unsho Ishizuka (EP1-25), Tessho Genda (EP26) (Japanese); Beau Billingslea (English)
Cain Ibrahim Hasan is the mayor's bodyguard. He later becomes commander of the special unit Pandora.
Cecile Sue (セシル・スー, Seshiru Sū)
Voiced by: Ai Kayano (Japanese); Allegra Clark (English)
Cecile Sue is the mayor of Neo Xianglong. Cecile has green eyes and shoulders length dove gray hair tied in a ponytail.
Jay Yun (ジェイ・ユン, Jei Yun)
Voiced by: Yūichiro Umehara (Japanese); Greg Chun (English)

Jay has long charcoal colored hair with a single red streak on the front right side.

Mr. Gold / David Kin (Mr.ゴールド / デビット・キン, Misutā Gōrudo / Debitto Kin)
Voiced by: Nobuyuki Hiyama (Japanese); Keith Silverstein (English)
The antagonist for the first half of the series, seeking to destroy Xianglong out of animosity towards Cecile and her family for forcing his father Edgar and their clan to submit. He later merges himself into a centipede BRAI that he enhanced by feeding it the bones of his ancestors, whose bones were infused with chaos influenced water, and is destroyed by Leon in the Pandora 1.
Sieg (ジーク, Jīku)
Voiced by: Yūichi Nakamura (Japanese); Todd Haberkorn (English)
The series antagonist who first offered his services to Mr. Gold by providing him with the means to attack Neo Xianglong. He is later revealed to be an entity that came into being during the "Xianglong Crisis" from a convergence of alternate versions of Lon Woo, initially possessing Lon Woo before creating his own body after his original self's death.
Hao Wang (ハオ・ワン, Hao Wan)
Voiced by: Takayuki Kondō (Japanese); Trevor Devall (English)
A martial artist and practitioner of the "Sky God Fist" style of martial arts, believing that might justifies the means following the "Xianglong Crisis". This mind set inspired him to murder his mentor and most of his peers, sparing Queenie as he believes she would be an ideal opponent to face later. Wang offers his services and that of his falcon BRAI pet to Mr. Gold in order to force Queenie to release her full potential via the Hyperdrive.
Fau (フォー, Fō)
Voiced by: Kaito Ishikawa (Japanese); Johnny Yong Bosch (English)
A cyborg assassin loyal to Mr. Gold whose body got heavily damaged around the time of his employer's demise. Fau survived by merging himself with a dog BRAI and tries to kill a hospitalized Cecile, only to fail and get obliterated.
Lon Woo (ロン・ウー, Ron Ū)
Voiced by: Akira Ishida (Japanese); Grant George (English)
A scientist who oversaw the experiment that caused the "Xianglong Crisis" and claimed his life, later revealed to have been influenced by Sieg in his final days.
Fiona Sue (フィオナ・スー, Fiona Sū)
Voiced by: Mamiko Noto (Japanese); Cristina Vee (English)
A mysterious girl who is Cecile's sister, appearing before her and Leon.
Edgar Kin (エドガー・キン, Edogā Kin)
Voiced by: Joji Nakata (Japanese)
Emilia Valli (エミリア・ヴァリ, Emiria Vari)
Voiced by: Asami Seto (Japanese); Cherami Leigh (English)
A scientist from Doug's past.

== Media ==
=== Manga ===
A prequel manga adaptation and a 4-panel spinoff were announced. The prequel manga, titled Jūshinki Pandora 0, is serialized on Pixiv's website.

=== Anime ===
On October 17, 2017, it was announced that Shoji Kawamori's latest project had been revealed to be an original TV anime. The series is directed by Shoji Kawamori and Hidekazu Sato and features animation by Satelight. Toshizo Nemoto is writing the series. Risa Ebata provides character designs for the series. The opening theme is "Sirius" and the ending theme is "Spica"; both are performed by Bump of Chicken. The songs "New Generation" and "Meteor" by Shiena Nishizawa and the song "Kanashimi to Tomo ni" (悲しみと共に, With Sorrow) by Megumi Nakajima are used as insert themes in the series.

No.	Title	Original release date
1	"An Evolving Destroyer"; Transliteration: "Shinka Suru Hakaisha" (Japanese: 進化する破壊者)	April 4, 2018
2	"Those Who Open The Box"; Transliteration: "Hako wo Akeshi Mono" (Japanese: 箱を開けし者)	April 11, 2018
3	"2038 Neo-Xianglong"; Transliteration: "2038 Neo-Shanron" (Japanese: 2038 ネオ翔龍)	April 18, 2018
4	"Operation Howl Breakthrough"; Transliteration: "Hōkō Toppa Sakusen" (Japanese: 咆哮突破作戦)	April 25, 2018
5	"The Enemy Above"; Transliteration: "Zujō no Teki" (Japanese: 頭上の敵)	May 2, 2018
6	"The Wings of Grief and Revenge"; Transliteration: "Ai to Fukushū no Tsubasa" (Japanese: 哀と復讐の翼)	May 9, 2018
7	"The Phantom Panda"; Transliteration: "Genei no Kumaneko" (Japanese: 幻影の熊猫)	May 16, 2018
8	"The Blind Spot in the Rain"; Transliteration: "Ame no Shikaku" (Japanese: 雨の死角)	May 23, 2018
9	"Eye of the Tiger"; Transliteration: "Tora no Me" (Japanese: 虎の目)	May 30, 2018
10	"Red Flame Recollection"; Transliteration: "Guren no Tsuisō" (Japanese: 紅蓮の追想)	June 6, 2018
11	"Dr. Lon Woo"; Transliteration: "Dokutā Ron Ū" (Japanese: Dr.ロン・ウー)	June 13, 2018
12	"Red God of Death"; Transliteration: "Akai Shinigami" (Japanese: 赤い死神)	June 20, 2018
13	"The Cries of Chaos"; Transliteration: "Konton No Sakebi" (Japanese: 渾沌の叫び)	June 27, 2018
14	"The Tower of Grudges"; Transliteration: "Onnen no Tō" (Japanese: 怨念の塔)	July 4, 2018
15	"The Fierce God of Gold"; Transliteration: "Ōgon no Kijin" (Japanese: 黄金の鬼神)	July 11, 2018
16	"The Innovator"; Transliteration: "Henkakusha" (Japanese: 変革者)	July 18, 2018
17	"A Servant's Pride"; Transliteration: "Jūsha no Hokori" (Japanese: 従者の誇り)	July 25, 2018
18	"Dueling Blades"; Transliteration: "Kasanaru Yaiba" (Japanese: 重なる刃)	August 1, 2018
19	"The Awakening Begins"; Transliteration: "Kakusei no Hajimari" (Japanese: 覚醒の始まり)	August 8, 2018
20	"The Target in the Sky"; Transliteration: "Tenkũ no Hyōteki" (Japanese: 天空の標的)	August 15, 2018
21	"Reverberating Souls"; Transliteration: "Hibikiau Tamashii" (Japanese: 響きあう魂)	August 22, 2018
22	"The Closed Mountain"; Transliteration: "Tozasareta Yama" (Japanese: 閉ざされた山)	August 29, 2018
23	"The Circle of Life"; Transliteration: "Seimei no Wa" (Japanese: 生命の環)	September 5, 2018
24	"At the End of Evolution"; Transliteration: "Shinka no Hate" (Japanese: 進化の果て)	September 12, 2018
25	"The Black Shine"; Transliteration: "Kuroki Kagayaki" (Japanese: 黒き輝き)	September 19, 2018
26	"The Chosen Future"; Transliteration: "Erabareta Mirai" (Japanese: 選ばれた未来)	September 26, 2018
