= Daoko =

Japanese female singer and rapper (born 1997)

Daoko だをこ, ダヲコ
- Born: March 4, 1997 (age 29); Tokyo, Japan
- Genres: Eurodance; synthpop; R&B; indie pop; hip hop
- Occupations: Singer; rapper; songwriter
- Years active: 2012–present
- Labels: Low High Who? Production (2012–15); Toy's Factory (2015–2020) teftef (2021–2025) uniera (2025–present)
- Website: daoko.jp

Daoko (だをこ; born March 4, 1997) is a Japanese singer and rapper born in Tokyo. Her career began when one of her videos uploaded to Nico Nico Douga in 2012, when she was 15, received attention.

== Career ==
The name Daoko (ダヲコ) was originally her web nickname.

Her first tour began on 15 January 2016 at Tsutaya O-East, Tokyo, Japan. Daoko was nominated for Next Break Artist at the MTV Video Music Awards Japan 2015.

She had caught the attention of multiple Japanese artists such as m-flo, which led to the collaboration of the two artists to produce their single IRONY in 2013. IRONY was used as the theme song of the movie Eagle Talon – Beautiful Elliere Deodorant Plus (鷹の爪~美しきエリエール消臭プラス~).

Daoko released her first album, Hyper Girl, on 5 December 2012 through Low High Who? Production. She received a large amount of attention for her vocal work in the music video "ME!ME!ME!" composed by TeddyLoid on 21 November 2014. Daoko left Low High Who? Production after releasing her album Dimension on 4 February 2015 and subsequently shut down her blog. In 2017, she and Kenshi Yonezu performed the song "Uchiage Hanabi", which was used as the theme song to the anime film Fireworks.

In 2018, Daoko attended 69th NHK Kōhaku Uta Gassen. She performed at Cosplay Mania in the Philippines in 2023.

== Discography ==
=== Studio albums ===
Title	Album details	Peak chart positions		Sales
Title	Album details	JPN	JPN Hot	Sales
Hyper Girl: Mukōgawa no Onna no Ko (HYPERGIRL-向こう側の女の子-)	Released: 5 December 2012; Label: Low High Who? Production; Formats: CD, digital download, streaming	—	—	
Gravity	Released: 11 December 2013; Label: Low High Who? Production; Formats: CD, digital download, streaming	200	—	
Dimension	Released: 4 February 2015; Label: Low High Who? Production; Formats: CD, digital download, streaming	207	—	
Daoko	Released: 25 March 2015; Label: Toy's Factory; Formats: CD, digital download, streaming	50	—	JPN: 1,726
Thank You Blue	Released: 20 December 2017; Label: Toy's Factory; Formats: CD, digital download, streaming	13	9	JPN: 13,500
Shiteki Ryoko (私的旅行)	Released: 12 December 2018; Label: Toy's Factory; Formats: CD, digital download, streaming	19	14	JPN: 4,791
Daoko×Dragalia Lost (DAOKO×ドラガリアロス)	Collaborative album with Dragalia Lost; Released: 9 October 2019; Label: Toy's Factory; Formats: CD, digital download, streaming	12	17	JPN: 5,223
Anima	Released: 29 July 2020; Label: Toy's Factory; Formats: CD, digital download, streaming	25	31	JPN: 1,794
Slash-&-Burn	Released: 22 May 2024; Label: Teftef; Formats: CD, LP, digital download, streaming	—	77	
Birth in Blue	Scheduled: 2 December 2026; Label: Uniera; Formats: Blu-ray, CD, digital download, streaming	To be released		
"—" denotes releases that did not chart.

=== Live albums ===
Title	Album details
Daoko Live Unplugged in Sogetsu Hall (Daoko Live Unplugged in 草月ホール)	Released: 3 August 2022; Label: teftef; Formats: Digital download

=== Extended plays ===
Title	Album details
Shoki Shōjō (初期症状)	Released: 20 July 2012; Label: Low High Who? Production; Formats: Digital download
Ututu	Released: 11 September 2013; Label: Low High Who? Production; Formats: CD, digital download
Kirei Goto (きれいごと) (with koducer)	Released: 24 December 2014; Label: Fly N' Spin Records; Formats: Digital download
Charm Point (チャームポイント)	Released: 20 December 2017; Label: Toy's Factory; Formats: Digital download
The Light of Other Days	Released: 30 June 2021; Label: teftef; Formats: Digital download
Mad EP (with Yohji Igarashi)	Released: 23 March 2022; Label: teftef; Formats: Digital download
Meta Millefeuille	Released: 19 November 2025; Label: Uniera; Formats: Digital download

=== Singles ===
==== As lead artist ====
Title	Year	Peak chart positions		Certifications	Sales	Album
Title	Year	JPN	JPN Hot	Certifications	Sales	Album
"ShibuyaK"	2015	23	17			Thank You Blue
"Samishii Kamisama" (さみしいかみさま)	2015	23	—			Thank You Blue
"Moshimo Bokura ga Game no Shuyaku de" (もしも僕らがGAMEの主役で)	2016	29	53			Thank You Blue
"Daisuki" (ダイスキ) (with TeddyLoid)	2016	29	—			Thank You Blue
"Bang!"	2016	29	—			Thank You Blue
"Haikei Goodbye Sayõnara" (拝啓グッバイさようなら)	2017	—	—			Thank You Blue
"Uchiage Hanabi" (打上花火) (with Kenshi Yonezu)	2017	9	1	RIAJ: 2× Platinum (DL); RIAJ: 3× Platinum (st.)	JPN: 500,000 (DL); JPN: 30,000 (CD)	Thank You Blue
"Step Up Love" (ステップアップLOVE) (with Yasuyuki Okamura)	2017	8	10		JPN: 16,000 (CD)	Thank You Blue
"Drama" (ドラマ) (with Takeshi Kobayashi)	2019	—	—			Non-album singles
"Hajimemashite no Kimochi wo" (はじめましての気持ちを)	2019	—	95			Non-album singles
"Otogi no Machi" (御伽の街)	2020	—	—			Anima
"Ocharaketa yo" (おちゃらけたよ)	2020	—	—			Anima
"Groggy Ghost" (with TAAR)	2021	—	—			Non-album singles
"Affordance" (with GuruConnect)	2022	—	—			Non-album singles
"Escape" (with Yohji Igarashi)	2022	—	—			Non-album singles
"Rinkou" (燐光)	2022	—	—			Non-album singles
"Abon" (あぼーん)	2023	—	—			Non-album singles
"Allure of the Dark"	2023	—	—			Non-album singles
"Nanairo Colorful" (with Tomggg)	2023	—	—			Non-album singles
"Tenshi ga Itayo" (天使がいたよ)	2024	—	—			Non-album singles
"Zense wa Busho" (前世は武将)	2025	—	—			Meta Millefeuille
"Boku dake no Photon" (僕だけのフォトン)	2025	—	—			Meta Millefeuille
"Iiyo" (いいよ)	2025	—	—			Meta Millefeuille
"Comit Comet"	2026	—	—			Non-album singles
"Rabbits Over Work" (仕事よりうさぎ) (with Seiichi Nagai)	2026	—	—			Non-album singles
"Affordance Remix" (with GuruConnect)	2026	—	—			Non-album singles
"Tactic"	2026	— (Note: "Tactic" did not enter the Oricon Singles Chart but peaked at number 19 on the Oricon Digital Singles chart.)	— (Note: "Tactic" did not enter the Billboard Japan Hot 100 but peaked at number 20 on the Download Songs chart.)		JPN: 3,371 (DL)	Birth in Blue
"Sync"	2026	—	—			Birth in Blue
"Trickstar" (feat. Peanuts-kun)	2026	—	—			Birth in Blue
"—" denotes releases that did not chart.

==== As featured artist ====
Title	Year	Album
"Me!Me!Me!" (TeddyLoid feat. Daoko)	2014	Non-album singles
"Troy" (Dios feat. Daoko)	2024	Non-album singles
"Taiwan Girl" (Uotomizz feat. Daoko)	2025	Tukanomaoyuugiya
"Act" (アクト) (Giga & TeddyLoid feat. Daoko)	2025	Non-album singles
"World is Yours (Band ver.)" (Genius P.J's feat. Suisoh & Daoko)	2025	Non-album singles
"Filter//Bubble" (Ubugoe feat. Suisoh & Daoko)	2026	Non-album singles

=== Promotional singles ===
Title	Year	Peak chart positions		Album
Title	Year	JPN	JPN Hot	Album
"Girl"	2015	—	—	Non-album singles
"Kakurenbo" (かくれんぼ)	2017	—	—	Non-album singles
"Forever Friends"	2017	—	—	"Uchiage Hanabi" (single)
"Charm Point" (チャームポイント)	2017	—	—	Charm Point
"Owaranai Sekai de" (終わらない世界で)	2018	— (Note: "Owaranai Sekai de" did not enter the Oricon Singles Chart but peaked at number 39 on the Oricon Digital Singles chart.)	49	Shiteki Ryoko
"Bokura no Network" (ぼくらのネットワーク) (with Nakata Yasutaka)	2018	—	—	Daoko×Dragalia Lost
"Senkyaku Banrai" (千客万来) (with Miyavi)	2019	—	—	No Sleep Till Tokyo
"Anniversary"	2019	—	—	Daoko×Dragalia Lost
"A Grand Triumphant Return" (余裕の凱旋) (with Ringo Sheena)	2024	—	—	Carnival
"—" denotes releases that did not chart.

=== Other charted songs ===
Title	Year	Peak chart positions	Album
Title	Year	JPN Hot	Album
"Suisei" (水星)	2015	49	Daoko

== Filmography ==
=== Film ===
Year	Title	Role	Network	Notes
2022	xxxHOLiC	Marudashi	Movie	Support Role

=== Television ===
Year	Title	Role	Network	Notes
2020	Followers	Herself	Netflix	Japanese drama / episode 1

== Awards ==
Year	Ceremony	Award	Nominated work	Result
2015	2015 MTV Video Music Awards Japan	Next Break Artist		Nominated
2018	Space Shower Music Awards	Song of the Year	"Uchiage Hanabi"	Won
2018	Space Shower Music Awards	Best Breakthrough Artist	Herself	Won
2018	MTV Europe Music Award	Best Japanese Act	Herself	Nominated
2019	Space Shower Music Awards	Best Female Artist	Herself	Nominated

== Performances ==
- 6 April 2015 – Party for first major album in Shibuya, Tokyo, Japan
- 17 August 2015 – Live Solo in Shibuya, Tokyo, Japan
- 14 September 2015 – Japanese Animation Trade Fair (Nico Nico Live)
- 15 January 2016 – First Tour (Tsutaya O-East, Tokyo, Japan)
- 8 March 2017 – Aoiro Jidai Tour (LIQUIDROOM in Ebisu, Tokyo, Japan)
- 30 September 2017 – Anime Weekend Atlanta

== Bibliography ==
- Daoko (19 November 2016), Daoko The Zine 01: D-LOVER (in Japanese)
- Daoko (19 November 2016), D-LOVERS vol.2 (in Japanese)
- Daoko (10 August 2017), One room seaside step (in Japanese) (Paperback ed.), Tokyo: KADOKAWA, ISBN 978-4-040-69331-6
- Daoko (29 March 2018), D-LOVERS vol.3 (in Japanese)
- Daoko; SHINKAI BABA (12 November 2019), 2019 気づき展写真集 [Enlightening my world Photobook] (in Japanese) (Paperback ed.), Tokyo, EAN 8358532029481, archived from the original on 13 May 2020
