= BRADIO =

Japanese funk rock band

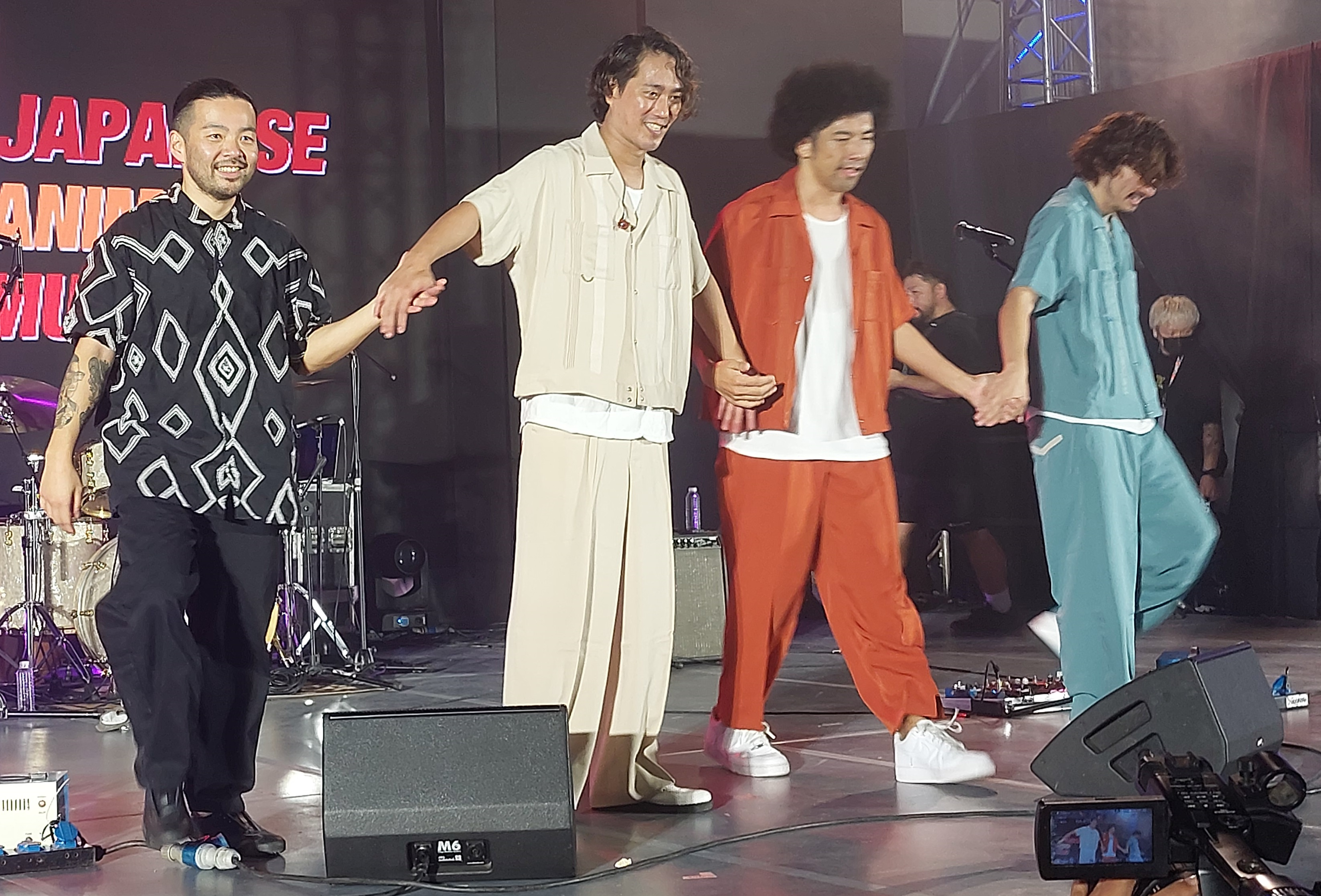
- BRADIO appearing on stage at Cosplay Mania 2024 in Manila

Background information
- Origin: Japan
- Genres: Funk rock; disco; soul
- Years active: 2010–present
- Labels: D&S Records (2013–2014); Hero Music Entertainment (2014–2017); Warner Music Japan (2017–2021); Hero Music Entertainment (2022); Nippon Crown (2023–present)
- Members: Takaaki Shingyoji; Soichi Ohyama; Ryosuke Sakai
- Past members: Takahiro Kitazawa; Yuki Tanabe
- Website: bradio.jp

BRADIO (ブラディオ, Buradio) is a Japanese funk rock band. Their name is an acronym for "Break the Rule And Do Image On" and means that they will break the rules of everyday life, and while having a wonderful image all around, they will make a new good place. The members call their fans Funky Party People (FPP).

== History ==
In 2010, The Movie Archives' Takaaki Shingyoji and Yuki Tanabe formed BRADIO with Soichi Ohyama (ex-Gold End), Ryosuke Sakai (ex-Gold End), and Takahiro Kitazawa (ex-Awesome Dude). That same year in December, they released their first demo and played in their first live concert. In April 2012, they released their second demo. In June 2012, Takahiro left the band and they were left with the line up that lasted until 2018.

They signed with D&S Records and released their first mini album, Diamond Pops, in October 2013. Bradio released their second mini-album, Swipe Times, in July 2014 under Hero Music Entertainment. Their first single "Otona Hit Parade/Step In Time" was released in November 2014. At the beginning of 2015, their single, "Flyers", was used as the opening theme song for the anime Death Parade.

On June 3, 2015, Bradio released their first full-length album, Power of Life. Their single "Hotel Alien", released on November 11, 2015, was used as the opening of the anime Peeping Life Season 1. Their first ballad single "Gift" was released on June 1, 2016. The single was intended to express a thank you from all children to their mothers. Later that month, their song "Bring it on" was used in the Square Enix mobile game Rungun-Cannonball. Their single "Back to the Funk" was released on November 11, 2016. Their second album, Freedom, was released on January 18, 2017.

The band released the single"La pa Paradise" on October 11, 2017. As this was their first single released after their move to the Warner Music Japan label, the band designates it as their first major single. On January 15, 2018, Bradio announced on their website, that drummer and founding member Yuki Tanabe would be leaving the band.

Bradio performed internationally for the first time at A-Kon 2018 in Fort Worth, Texas. They returned to the United States to perform at Otakon in Washington, D.C., on July 24, 2019. They released their third album and their first under a major label YES on July 4, 2018, and their fourth album Joyful Style on April 21, 2021.

In April 2023, their song "Soul Galaxy" was featured as the second opening theme for the anime Yu-Gi-Oh! Go Rush!!. The song was later featured as a single for their fifth album, Dancehall Magic, which released on May 3, 2023. Later that year, their single "Fanfare" was used as the opening theme song for the anime adaptation of Reborn as a Vending Machine, I Now Wander the Dungeon.

== Band members ==
Current members

- Takaaki Shingyoji (真行寺 貴秋) — lead vocal (2010–present)
- Soichi Ohyama (大山 聡一) — guitar, vocals (2010–present)
- Ryosuke Sakai (酒井 亮輔) — bass, vocals (2010–present)

Former members

- Takahiro Kitazawa (北澤 雄大) — guitar (2010–2012)
- Yuki Tanabe (田邊 有希) — drums, vocals (2010–2018)

== Discography ==
=== Studio albums ===
Title	Album details	Peak position
Title	Album details	JPN
Power of Life	Released: June 3, 2015; Label: Hero Music Entertainment; Formats: CD, digital download	22
Freedom	Released: January 18, 2017; Label: Hero Music Entertainment; Formats: CD, digital download	21
YES	Released: July 4, 2018; Label: Warner Music Japan; Formats: CD, digital download	19
Joyful Style	Released: April 21, 2021; Label: Warner Music Japan; Formats: CD, digital download	19
Dancehall Magic	Released: May 3, 2023; Label: Crown; Formats: CD, digital download	21
Party Booster	Released: May 22, 2024; Label: Crown; Formats: CD, digital download	21

=== Mini albums ===
Title	Album details	Peak position
Title	Album details	JPN
Diamond Pops	Released: October 2, 2013; Label: D&S Records; Formats: CD, digital download	—
Swipe Times	Released: July 9, 2014; Label: Hero Music Entertainment; Formats: CD, digital download	120
The Volcanoes	Released: February 16, 2022; Label: Hero Music Entertainment; Formats: CD, digital download	—

=== Singles ===
Title	Year	Peak position	Album
Title	Year	JPN Oricon	Album
"Otona Hit Parade/Step in Time" (オトナHit Parade/Step in Time)	2014	160	Power of Life
"Flyers"	2015	47	Power of Life
"Hotel Alien" (HOTELエイリアン)	2015	47	Freedom
"Gift" (ギフト)	2016	51	Freedom
"Back to the Funk"	2016	—	Freedom
"La Pa Paradise" (Note: This single was released after their move to Warner Music Japan, so it is referred to as the band's "1st major single".)	2017	25	YES
"Kirameki Dancin'" (きらめきDancin')	2017	23	YES
"O・TE・A・GE・DA!"	2019	34	Joyful Style
"Shiawase no Shanna" (幸せのシャナナ)	2020	—	Joyful Style
"Ai wo Ima" (愛を、今)	2021	—	Joyful Style
"Owaranai" (オワラナイ)	2023	—	Dancehall Magic
"Soul Galaxy" (ソウル・ギャラクシー)	2023	—	Dancehall Magic
"Ban Ban Tonight"	2023	—	Dancehall Magic
"Fanfare"	2023	—	—
