= Reimy =

REIMY
- Also known as: Remedios
- Born: Reimi Horikawa (堀川 麗美); January 6, 1965 (age 61); Ginowan, Okinawa Islands, USCAR
- Origin: Okinawa, Japan
- Genres: J-pop, Film score
- Occupations: Singer-songwriter, composer
- Years active: 1984–1995
- Labels: Nippon Columbia (JPN, 1984–1985); Sixty (JPN, 1986–1988); A&M (USA, 1988); Vendetta (USA, 1989); Fun House (JPN, 1989–1993)

Reimi Horikawa (堀川 麗美, Horikawa Reimi; born January 6, 1965, in Ginowan, Okinawa), better known by her stage name REIMY (stylized in all caps), is a Japanese singer-songwriter and composer. She has released 11 solo albums, and through the musical project Remedios, has produced and composed multiple anime and film scores.

== Discography ==
=== Albums ===
- Reimy (1984)
- "R" (1984)
- Pansy (1985)
- Reimy Brand (Best-of album, 1986)
- My Sanctuary (1986)
- Endless Plus Version (1987)
- Smooth Talk (1988)
- Yes We're Singles (Compilation, 1988)
- Kotoba no nai Yūjō (言葉のない友情) (1989)
- Hashiru Soyokaze tachi e (走るそよ風たちへ) (1990)
- Yume wa Oite Masenka (夢はおいてませんか) (1991)
- The Dream of It (Compilation, 1992)
- Magic Railway (1992)
- Nomad (1995)
- Reimy Brand Complete (Best-of album, 2005)

=== Singles ===
- "Ai ni Desperate" (愛にDESPERATE) (January 1, 1984)
- "Seishun no Riguretto" (青春のリグレット) (May 21, 1984)
- "Zansho" (残暑) (September 21, 1984)
- "Time Travelers" (May 21, 1985)
- "Moebius Story" (メビウス・ストーリー) (December 12, 1985)
- "Just Only You" (July 25, 1986)
- Koisuru Jikan (恋する時間) (November 1, 1986)
- "Fa・ri・ra" (June 25, 1987)
- "Speed of Light" (1988)
- "Tokai no Safāri Pāku" (都会のサファリパーク) (February 25, 1989)
- "Angel" (June 1, 1989)
- "Machi ni Kieta Kurisumasu Kādo" (街に消えたクリスマスカード) (October 25, 1989)
- "Dear Tess" (February 21, 1990)
- "Two of Us" (June 1, 1990)
- "Kasa wa Oite masenka" (傘はおいてませんか) (December 1, 1990)
- "Everlasting Love" (March 1, 1991)
- "Everlasting Love" (English Version) (July 25, 1991)
- "Love Lecture" (LOVE レクチャー) (Christmas Version) (October 25, 1991)
- "Dakishimetai" (抱きしめたい) (April 25, 1992)
- "Diamond Wing" (July 25, 1992)
- "Wandāgāru" (ワンダーガール; "Wonder Girl") (November 1, 1992)

== Film & Anime Scores (as REMEDIOS) ==
- Fried Dragon Fish (1993)
- Fireworks: Should We See It from the Side or the Bottom? (1993)
- Undo (1994)
- Love Letter (1995)
- Picnic (1996)
- April Story (1998)
- Koko ni irukoto (2001)
- The Graduation (2002)
- Night Time Picnic (2006)
- Anohana: The Flower We Saw That Day (2011)
- Goodbye To Our Kindergarten (2011)

== Videography ==
- Reimy (March 21, 1984)
- First Flight (1985)
- My Sanctuary (1986)
- Angel (1989)
- Hashiru Soyokaze tachi he (走るそよ風たちへ) (Compilation video, 1990)
- "Platform" – Magic Railway Films – (1992)
- The Best Video Clips (1993)
