= Fireworks (2017 film) =

2017 anime film

- Theatrical teaser poster
- 打ち上げ花火、下から見るか? 横から見るか? Uchiage Hanabi, Shita kara Miru ka? Yoko kara Miru ka?
- Type: Film
- Based on: Fireworks, Should We See It from the Side or the Bottom? (If: Moshimo)
- Creator: Shunji Iwai
- Directors: Akiyuki Shinbo (Note: Chief Director (総監督).); Nobuyuki Takeuchi; Seimei Kidokoro (Note: Assistant Director (副監督). See the Shaft director credits legend.)
- Screenplay: Hitoshi Ōne
- Character designer: Akio Watanabe
- Music: Satoru Kōsaki
- Voices: Suzu Hirose; Masaki Suda; Mamoru Miyano; Takako Matsu
- Country of origin: Japan
- Original language: Japanese

Production
- Sound director: Yota Tsuruoka
- Art directors: Hisaharu Iijima; Yuuki Funagakure; Ayumi Miyakoshi
- Cinematographers: Rei Egami; Takayuki Aizu
- Color designers: Hitoshi Hibino; Izumi Takizawa
- CG directors: Shinya Takano; Takumi Endou; Keisuke Sasagawa; Kazuyuki Kamada
- Editor: Rie Matsubara
- Animation producer: Kazuki Soumiya
- Studio: Shaft
- Producers: Jūnosuke Itō; Akiko Yodo
- Production companies: Toho; Aniplex; Shaft; Kadokawa; Toy's Factory; JR East Marketing & Communications; Lawson HMV Entertainment; LINE
- Distributed by: Toho
- Runtime: 90 minutes
- Gross: US$26.6 million

Original release
- Release: August 18, 2017

Fireworks (Japanese: 打ち上げ花火、下から見るか? 横から見るか?, Hepburn: Uchiage Hanabi, Shita kara Miru ka? Yoko kara Miru ka?; lit. "Skyrockets, Watch from Below? Watch from the Side?"), also known as Fireworks, Should We See It from the Side or the Bottom? is a 2017 Japanese animated romance film based on Shunji Iwai's live-action television play of the same name. It received mixed reviews from critics who praised it for music and animation, but criticized the narrative and characterization. It is the sixth highest-grossing anime film of 2017 and has grossed over $26 million worldwide. It was released by Madman Entertainment, Anime Limited, and GKIDS.

== Plot ==
Norimichi Shimada and Nazuna Oikawa live in the town of Moshimo (Japanese for "if"). The students make a bet regarding whether the fireworks are flat or round in the sky. After finding a small glass marble, Nazuna, Norimichi, and Yusuke compete in the swimming pool race. Yusuke wins and Nazuna asks him to go on a date. Nazuna packs a suitcase and leaves home without family permission. Yusuke bails on the date and Nazuna is taken home by her mother. Norimichi throws the marble, wishing for luck and causing it to rewind time. Back when the race occurred, Norimichi wins this time around and Nazuna asks him on a date. They head to the train station, but are caught once again by Nazuna's mother and her fiancé. Norimichi learns that the fireworks are flat and is aware he is in an alternate timeline. He wishes for another chance to escape with Nazuna, throws the marble from a lighthouse, and reverses time again. He helps her elude the family and board the train. They are caught again by the others. When Yusuke pushes the two off the balcony, Norimichi uses the marble once again, wishing for no one to see them. Time jumps back again and the train takes a different route, leaving the two in the same town encapsulated in a glass dome. After a pyrotechnician uses the marble as a leftover firework charge, it explodes in the sky. After seeing the future within the shard, Nazuna and Norimichi embrace. The next day, the school notices the absence of Nazuna and Norimichi.

== Voice cast ==
Character
Character	Japanese	English
Nazuna Oikawa (及川 なずな, Oikawa Nazuna)	Suzu Hirose	Brooklyn Nelson
A female student whose father died after the divorce. Though she has no friends, she falls in love with Norimichi.
Norimichi Shimada (島田 典道, Shimada Norimichi)	Masaki Suda	Ryan Shanahan
A male student learning that fireworks are flat.
Yusuke Azumi (安曇 祐介, Azumi Yusuke)	Mamoru Miyano	Aaron Dalla Villa
Norimichi's friend. He believes Nazuna is in love with him or Norimichi.
Nazuna's mother	Takako Matsu	Julie Ann Taylor
An unnamed family woman of the latter. She and her fiancé plan to leave town.

== Production ==
On December 7, 2016, the film was announced with a release date of August 2017. Hitoshi Ōne added modern elements of the film. The cast and crew were also announced. On April 14, 2017, a second teaser trailer of the film was released. A 30-second trailer, the third promotional video for the film, was released in June 2017. Daoko and Kenshi Yonezu performed the film's theme song "Uchiage Hanabi". The music video received over 500 million views and is ranked on 1050th place on Top Viewed Videos on YouTube.

== Release ==
The film premiered in Japan on August 18, 2017, and in the United Kingdom on October 15, 2017. It was distributed in 110 countries and regions in July 2017. Madman Entertainment released the film on October 5, 2017. Edko Films released the film on October 31, 2017. It was released in the United Kingdom on November 15, 2017. Madness Entertainment released the film in Mexico on February 16, 2018. GKIDS released the promotion of the film on May 23, 2018. The film premiered in the United States on July 3, 2018, with the wide release on July 4.

== Reception ==
=== Box office ===
The film grossed ¥170 million from 133,000 admissions, ¥295 million from 220,000 admissions in two days, and grossed a total of ¥460 million (US$4.2 million) within three days of the premiere across 296 theaters, ranking at No. 3. The film placed at No. 4 on the second weekend. It stayed at No. 4 on the third weekend, where it grossed ¥104 million from 78,000 admissions and earned a total of ¥1.1 billion. The film had grossed ¥1.59 billion ($14,175,401) in Japan. It grossed $26 million worldwide on 3 December 2017, including $10.7 million in China, Singapore, Malaysia, and United Kingdom, and $15.3 million in other territories including Japan. The film grossed $11,943,229 in China, $525,280 in North America, $46,664 in Thailand and Bolivia, $191,137 in South Korea, and $91,155 in Spain and the United Kingdom, for a global total of $28,097,465.

=== Critical response ===
On review aggregator website Rotten Tomatoes, the film has an approval rating of 45% based on 29 reviews, with an average rating of 4.9/10. The site's critical consensus states "Fireworks seeks sparks in an ambitious blend of storytelling genres, but this misguided anime effort never truly takes flight". On Metacritic, which assigns a normalized rating, the film has a score 40 out of 100, based on 10 critics, indicating "mixed or average reviews". The film received praise before it was released from several critics and journalists. Musician Koremasa Uno lauded the voice acting and said the film "doesn't feel like a work from Iwai or Hitoshi Ōne, the scriptwriter. Rather, it feels more like the anime of the studio creating it, Shaft, and its producer, Genki Kawamura." Film writer Tatsuya Masutō wrote on his Twitter account that the "expectations surrounding the film did not disappoint, and the anime could be better than the original live-action drama." He also noted that the anime is "more than just a remake" and the "90-minute run time compared to the 50-minute original helps add to the content". Kim Morrissy of Anime News Network gave the film a "B" grade and applauded the "great music and voice acting" and the "simple yet emotionally compelling plot" but criticized the film's production values and visuals that "don't really add anything to the film except to broadcast that it was made by SHAFT". Mark Schilling of The Japan Times gave the film a rating of 3½ out of 5 stars and praised the film's "pure-hearted love story". Mark concluded the review by writing, "Fireworks nails it again and again—or maybe that was just me, slipping back into long-ago dreams of the perfect girl gazing into my soul, forever out of reach."

=== Accolades ===
Year	Name of Competition	Category	Result	Ref.
2017	41st Japan Academy Film Prize	Animation of the Year	Nominated	
2019	3rd Crunchyroll Anime Awards	Best Film	Nominated	
