= Starmarie =

Japanese idol group

STARMARIE
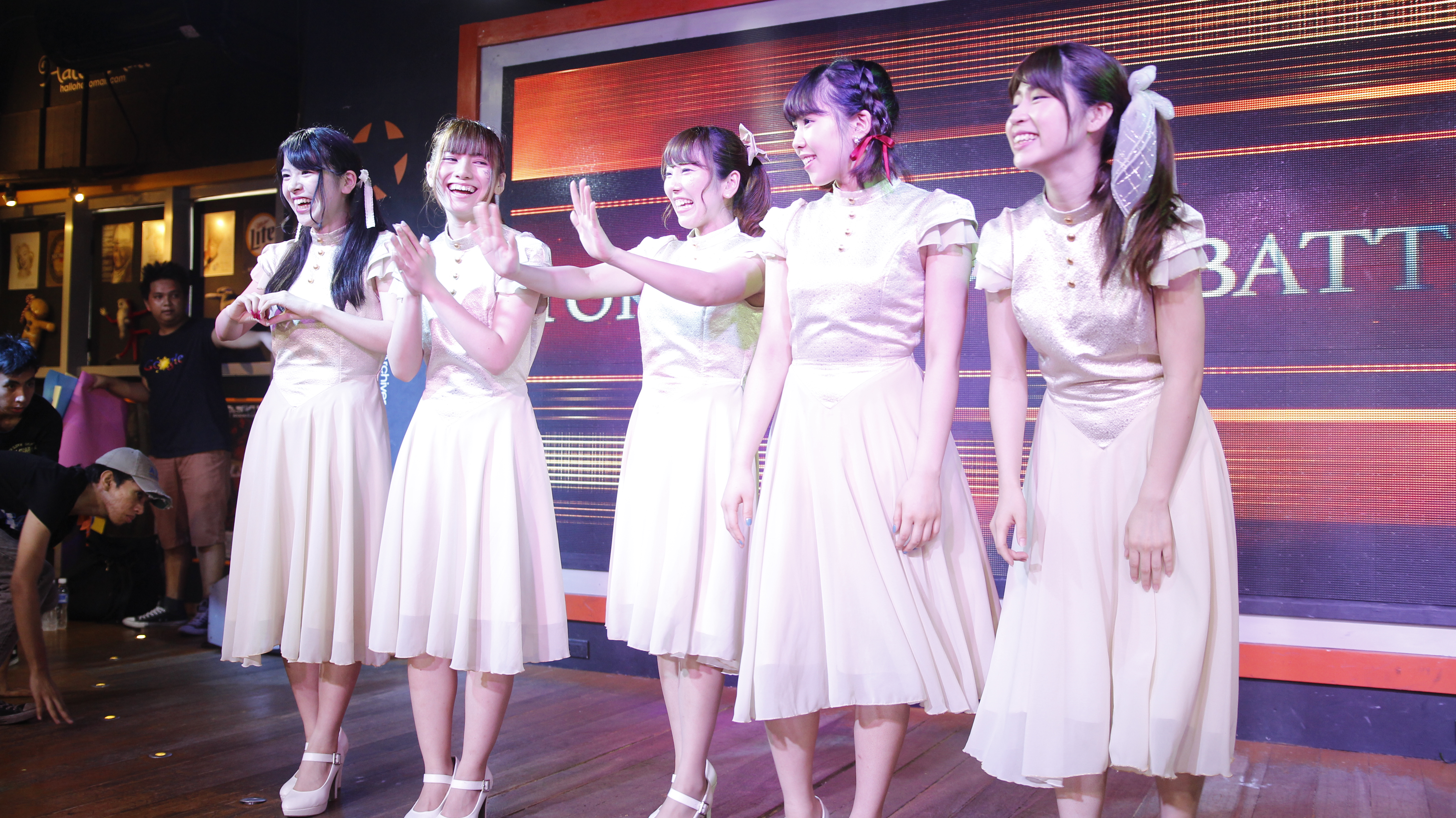

Background information
- Origin: Japan
- Genres: J-pop
- Years active: 2008–present
- Labels: SHIKISAI Records
- Members: Nozomi Kishita; Shino Takamori; Monya Nakane; Hiroka Matsuzaki
- Past members: Kaori Arai; Saya Sekine; Shiori Aoki; Kaede Watanabe
- Website: www.starmarie.com

Starmarie (スターマリー, stylized as STARMARIE) are a Japanese Idol Group consisting of Nozomi Kishita, Shino Takamori, Monya Nakane, Hiroka Matsuzaki and Kaede Watanabe. Formed in July 2008 as a three-member idol group under M-SMILE, they have since become a five-member group. The group is famous for performing theme music for anime such as Cardfight!! Vanguard G and Onigiri.

== History ==
Starmarie was formed in July 2008 as a three-member group with Kaori Arai, Saya Sekine and Shiori Aoki as the original members. Nozomi Kishita joined as the fourth member in August of the same year while Shino Takamori joined after the graduation of Kaori Arai.

In February 2009, they released their first single, Time Machine Love (タイムマシーン・ラブ).

In March 2014, the group performed as part of the Japan Nite event at SXSW. In June 2014, three new members, Motoko Nakane, Hiroka Matsuzaki, and Kaede Watanabe joined the group. Their song "Mekurumeku Yūki" was used as the fourth ending theme to the anime series Cardfight!! Vanguard G.

On December 4, 2016, the group, with AKB48's Team 8, performed on the 60 Years of Philippines-Japan Friendship celebration at the Market! Market! Activity Center in Taguig City, Philippines.

During their Asia Tour held at TSUTAYA O-EAST held on June 22, 2015, Nozomi Kishita declared their goal of performing in Budokan which has a seating capacity of 14,471, making this a big challenge for the group. In December 2016, August 2017, and February 2018, Starmarie held concerts in Nakano Sunplaza, which has a seating capacity of 2,222. Their song "Natsuninare!" is used as the fourth ending theme to the anime series Cardfight!! Vanguard G NEXT.

On September 3, 2020, Nozomi Kishita tested positive for COVID-19. She recovered on September 18.

On October 12, 2020, Kaede Watanabe announced her graduation.

== Members ==
=== Current ===
| Name | Japanese | Nickname | Birthdate | Date Joined |
|---|---|---|---|---|
| Nozomi Kishita | 木下望 | Nonchan (のんちゃん) | May 21 | August 16, 2008 |
| Shino Takamori | 紫乃 | Shinohamu (しのはむ) | July 19 | November 1, 2009 |
| Hiroka Matsuzaki | 博香 | Hiichan (ひぃちゃん) | October 4 | June 22, 2014 |
| Monya Nakane | 中根もにゃ | Monya (もにゃ) | October 9 | June 22, 2014 |

=== Former ===
| Name | Japanese | Date Left |
|---|---|---|
| Kaori Arai | 荒井香里 | November 2009 |
| Saya Sekine | 関根沙亜耶 | August 2010 |
| Shiori Aoki | 青木栞 | April 2014 |
| Kaede Watanabe | 渡辺楓 | October 2020 |

== Discography ==
=== Albums ===
| # | Title | Japanese Title | Release date | Oricon Weekly Albums Chart |
|---|---|---|---|---|
| 1 | FANTASY WORLD | ファンタジーワールド | February 23, 2011 | |
| 2 | FANTASY WORLD 2 | ファンタジーワールド2 | January 9, 2013 | |
| 3 | FANTASY WORLD 3 | ファンタジーワールド3 | April 16, 2014 | |
| 4 | FANTASY THEATER | - | April 4, 2017 | |

=== Mini albums ===
| # | Title | Japanese Title | Release date | Oricon Weekly Albums Chart |
|---|---|---|---|---|
| 1 | Fantasy Novel | - | February 19, 2016 | |
| 2 | Spell of the HALLOWEEN | - | October 1, 2016 | |

=== Best-of Albums ===
| # | Title | Japanese Title | Release date | Oricon Weekly Albums Chart |
|---|---|---|---|---|
| 1 | THE FANTASY WORLD | - | June 22, 2015 | |

=== Singles ===
| # | Title | Japanese Title | Release date | Oricon Weekly Albums Chart |
|---|---|---|---|---|
| 1 | Time Machine Love | タイムマシーン・ラブ | February 11, 2009 | 154 |
| 2 | Mahō Tsukai Lulu | 魔法使いルル | May 20, 2009 | 176 |
| 3 | Andromeda Propose | アンドロメダ・プロポーズ | February 24, 2010 | 148 |
| 4 | Monomane Shi Nero | モノマネ師ネロ | December 15, 2010 | 84 |
| 5 | Namida no Pan Kōjō 「Consel Kamata」 ~Single Version~ | 涙のパン工場「コンセル・カマタ」〜SINGLE VERSION〜 | April 27, 2011 | 130 |
| 6 | Mitsuboshi Restaurant Paul kara no Shōtaijō | 三ツ星レストラン・ポールからの招待状 | July 25, 2012 | 115 |
| 7 | Hagane no Yūki | ハガネの勇気 | October 10, 2012 | - |
| 8 | Circus wo Koroshita no wa Dare da | サーカスを殺したのは誰だ | December 3, 2014 | 58 |
| 9 | Net Auction Babies | ネット・オークション・ベイビーズ | May 27, 2015 | 58 |
| 10 | Mekurumeku Yūki | メクルメク勇気！ | August 19, 2015 | 25 |
| 11 | Hime wa Rankiryū Goikkō-sama | 姫は乱気流☆御一行様 | April 20, 2016 | 22 |
| 12 | Natsu ni Nare! | ナツニナレ! | July 4, 2017 | 27 |
