= KanColle: The Movie =

Japanese name
- Kanji: 劇場版 艦これ
Transcriptions
- Revised Hepburn: Gekijō-ban KanKore
- Directed by: Keizō Kusakawa
- Written by: Kensuke Tanaka; Jukki Hanada
- Based on: Kantai Collection by DMM.com and Kadokawa Games
- Produced by: Satoshi Motonaga; Daijō Kudō
- Starring: Sumire Uesaka; Saki Fujita; Yuka Iguchi; Ayane Sakura; Ayana Taketatsu; Nao Tōyama; Iori Nomizu; Rina Hidaka; Yumi Tanibe; Aya Suzaki
- Cinematography: Yasuyuki Itō
- Music by: Natsumi Kameoka
- Production company: Diomedéa
- Distributed by: Kadokawa Animation
- Release date: November 26, 2016
- Running time: 95 minutes
- Country: Japan
- Language: Japanese
- Box office: ¥560 million

KanColle: The Movie (Japanese: 劇場版 艦これ, Hepburn: Gekijō-ban KanKore) is a 2016 Japanese animated war film and the film adaptation of the video game series Kantai Collection. The film was produced by Diomedéa, directed by Keizō Kusakawa, and written by Kensuke Tanaka and Jukki Hanada, featuring character designs by Mayuko Matsumoto and Naomi Ide. It was released in Japan by Kadokawa Animation on November 26, 2016. It was confirmed that the film will get the 4DX and MX4D screenings throughout February 11, 2017. Aniplus Asia later screened the anime film.

Like in the TV series, the original voice cast of the game reprised their roles in this film. The film's theme song is "Kikan" (帰還, Return) by Shiena Nishizawa.

== Plot ==
The movie starts off after the events of Episode 3, when Kisaragi had sunk. The Mikawa Fleet (Furutaka, Aoba, Kako, Kinugasa and Tenryū) are in the middle of Night Battle (Battle of Savo Island). Chōkai uses Searchlight and gets medium damage, but they win in the end. A New Fleet Girl gets "dropped", emerging from the sea. It is Kisaragi. Kisaragi is brought back to the temporary base in Solomon Islands, but she is suffering from PTSD and has amnesia, unable to remember anyone from back in the anime, excluding Mutsuki.

Meanwhile, the fleet celebrates their victory in the Ironbottom sound campaign. During the time Kisaragi slowly starts turning into an Abyssal Vessel, but she is still able to retain her consciousness and starts crying. Seeing the situation, Kaga finally reveals the secret: At the start of this war, there were two factions, Fleet Girls and Abyssal Vessels. Both fight for an unknown reason, but if Fleet Girls sink, they become Abyssal Vessels, and the vice versa can happen where a sunk Abyssal Vessel can turn into a Fleet Girl.

There is this crimson aura in some areas in the ocean, which indicates a source of heavy Abyssal power resides in there. Kaga was originally an Abyssal Vessel and retains her memory as an Abyssal Vessel. The Fleet decides to investigate and commences an operation, consisting of 4 task forces, where the true goal was to escort Fubuki into this dark portal in the middle of the Crimson Sea, which is a source of the Abyssal Vessels' power. This portal is notably also seen in the some event maps of the main game.

Several battles occur, where several Fleet Girls become heavily damaged from battle but no one gets sunk. When they arrive at the Dark Portal, only Yamato, Mutsuki and Fubuki remain. Yamato and Mutsuki become Heavily Damaged from battle but out of nowhere, half-transformed Abyssal Kisaragi comes to their aid, and Fubuki takes the chance to jump into the Dark Portal.

It is revealed that this area was the place where the actual IJN Destroyer Fubuki got sunk in 1942 (Cape Esperance, the infamous 'Ware-Aoba'). The secret is revealed, that when all of the Ships sunk during back in World War II, their Souls left the ships, wandering around the sea, while constantly switching back and forth from Abyssal Vessels to Fleet Girls. Fubuki meets her Dark Persona, an Abyssal Fubuki, who tries to persuade Fubuki into becoming an Abyssal Vessel. Fubuki refuses, and both go through a mental breakdown through a Mind Battle, through which Fubuki and her doppelgänger become one.

Afterwards, the Dark Portal disappears, similar to when an Event map is cleared. Abyssal Vessels disappear from the area, but Abyssal Kisaragi disappears as well, after exchanging few last words with Mutsuki. Fubuki is afterwards promoted to both 11th Destroyer Division, as well as the Vanguard of the 2nd Torpedo Squadron for her efforts, but is immediately after called out for a mission, to which she promises her Dark Persona to make peace in the oceans one day.

In a post-credits scene, Mutsuki is able to reunite with Kisaragi; the movie concludes just as Mutsuki jumps to embrace her sister.

== Cast ==
- Sumire Uesaka as Fubuki
- Saki Fujita as Akagi, Tokitsukaze
- Yuka Iguchi as Kaga
- Ayane Sakura as Shimakaze, Nagato, Mutsu
- Ayana Taketatsu as Yamato
- Nao Tōyama as Kongo, Hiei, Haruna, Kirishima, Maya, Chokai
- Iori Nomizu as Zuikaku
- Rina Hidaka as Mutsuki, Kisaragi, Ryūjō
- Yumi Tanibe as Yuudachi
- Aya Suzaki as Akatsuki, Hibiki, Ikazuchi, Inazuma
- Risa Taneda as Ashigara, Haguro, Akashi
- Megumi Nakajima as Kinugasa
- Sarah Emi Bridcutt as Yubari
- Ayako Kawasumi as Oyodo
- Yui Ogura as Amatsukaze
