= Fireworks, Should We See It from the Side or the Bottom? (If: Moshimo) =

- If: Moshimo episode
- DVD cover
- Episode no.: Season 1 Episode 16
- Directed by: Shunji Iwai
- Written by: Shunji Iwai
- Cinematography by: Ichirō Chazono
- Editing by: Kōji Kanaya
- Original air date: August 26, 1993
- Running time: 45 minutes

Fireworks, Should We See It from the Side or the Bottom? (Japanese: 打ち上げ花火、下から見るか? 横から見るか?, Hepburn: Uchiage Hanabi, Shita kara Miru ka? Yoko kara Miru ka?) is a 1993 Japanese youth drama television play written and directed by Shunji Iwai. The play was originally produced for the drama anthology series If: Moshimo (if もしも) and broadcast as its sixteenth episode, on August 26, 1993. It was later re-edited for a theatrical release in Japanese cinemas on August 12, 1995.

Iwai later directed a feature-length documentary about the making of the original TV play, and it was adapted into the 2017 anime film directed by Akiyuki Shinbo and a novel written by Iwai, both released in 2017.

== Plot ==
One summer day, a group of sixth-grade boys have an argument about whether fireworks are round or flat when viewed from different angles and embark on a journey for the answer during the annual firework festival. Meanwhile, one of their classmates, Nazuna, is troubled by her parents' separation and decides to choose one of the boys to run away with.

== Awards ==
- 1993 – Directors Guild of Japan New Directors Award

== Adaptation ==
- Fireworks (2017)
