= Rino Romano =

Canadian actor

- Occupation: Actor
- Years active: 1983–present

Rino Romano is a Canadian actor. Having first appeared in on-screen roles in the 1990s, he became best known for his voice acting in the following decade; he has served as the voice of Batman and Spider-Man in various media. He has also served as the narrator for the Curious George animated franchise.

== Career ==
He is known for his work as Batman in the animated series The Batman (2004–2008), Spider-Man in Spider-Man Unlimited (1999–2001), and the video games Spider-Man, Spider-Man 2: Enter Electro, X-Men: Mutant Academy 2 for PlayStation and an uncredited cameo in X2: Wolverine's Revenge, Eduardo Rivera in Extreme Ghostbusters, Luis Sera in Resident Evil 4, King Pen and Scorp in the Skylanders franchise, Carlos "Stunts" Rey in NASCAR Racers and the original Tuxedo Mask in the '90s English dub of the anime series Sailor Moon.

From 2007 to 2022, Romano also provided voice narration for the PBS series Curious George, as well as previews on NBC, The WB, and The CW. He was also the narrator for the syndicated courtroom reality TV series Hot Bench from 2014 to 2020.

== Personal life ==
He dated fellow actress Kathryn Fiore in 1999.

In 2018, he sold his home in Hollywood Hills West, Los Angeles for $1.647 million.

== Filmography ==
=== Film ===
Year	Title	Role	Notes
1983	Snow	Lewis	Short film
1989	Sing	Blade	
1993	A Man in Uniform	Clyde	
1994	The Club	Evan	
1994	Getting Gotti	Johnny Dio	Television film
1995	Iron Eagle IV	Pilot of Minotaur	
1995	Soul Survivor	Goldfinger	
1996	Getting Away with Murder	Student #5	
1996	The Conspiracy of Fear	Zelmo	Direct-to-video
1997	Hostile Intent	Press	
2005	Cruel but Necessary	Wayne	
2005	The Batman vs. Dracula	Bruce Wayne / Batman (voice)	Direct-to-video
2006	Stuart Little 3: Call of the Wild	Monty (voice)	Direct-to-video
2007	The Batman: Season 4 Unmasked	Himself	Direct-to-video; Short film
2007	The Story of the 2006 Diamond goldBar Wolfpack	Narrato (voice)	Direct-to-video; Documentary
2008	Dragonlance: Dragons of Autumn Twilight	Caramon Majere, Goblin Guard, Goblin Leader (voice)	Direct-to-video
2009	Level 26: Dark Origins	Sqweegel (voice)	Short film
2010	Get Him to the Greek	Announcer	
2013	Curious George: A Halloween Boo Fest	Narrator	Direct-to-video
2013	Curious George Swings Into Spring	Narrator	Direct-to-video
2023	The Super Mario Bros. Movie	Uncle Tony (voice)	

=== Television ===
Year	Title	Role	Notes
1990	Maniac Mansion	Ryan Forrester	Episode: "National Security Risk"
1990	On Thin Ice: The Tai Babilonia Story	Unknown Role	Television film
1991	My Secret Identity	Station Manager's Nephew	Episode: "Pirate Radio"
1991	Street Legal	Gary	Episode: "Keeping Secrets"
1993	Amy Fisher: My Story	Mick	Television film
1993	Class of '96	Vincent	Episode: "Bright Smoke, Cold Fire"
1993–1994	Tales from the Cryptkeeper	Eddie (voice)	2 episodes
1994	Getting Gotti	Dio	Television film
1994	The Mighty Jungle	Eric	Episode: "Wrapping It Up"
1994	Dog City	Yves (voice)	Episode: "Dog Days of Summer Vacation"
1994–1996	The Busy World of Richard Scarry	Billy Dog (voice)	Main role
1995	Kung Fu: The Legend Continues	Quirk	Episode: "Quake!"
1995	Sailor Moon	Tuxedo Mask (voice)	DiC English dub
1995	Ready or Not	Judge	Episode: "Under One Roof"
1995	Sugartime	Phil Alderisio	Television film
1995	TekWar	Drieger	Episode: "Tek Posse"
1995	Falling for You	Desk Cop	Television film
1995	Ultraforce	Prototype (voice)	Episode: "Prime Time"
1995–1996	Due South	Ian MacDonald	2 episodes
1996	Losing Chase	Batender	Television film
1996	Gargoyles	Gang Leader (voice)	Episode: "And Justice for All"
1996	Mortal Kombat: Defenders of the Realm	Rain (voice)	Episode: "Skin Deep"
1996–1997	Traders	Mike Fabris	3 episodes
1997	F/X: The Series	Ricky	Episode: "Siege"
1997	Extreme Ghostbusters	Eduardo Rivera (voice)	Main cast; 40 episodes
1997–1998	Men in Black: The Series	Troy (voice)	2 episodes
1998	Halloweentown	Benny (voice)	Television film
1998	Oh Yeah! Cartoons	Various voices	2 episodes
1998–2000	Godzilla: The Series	Randy Hernandez (voice)	Main cast
1999	Hang Time	Cartman Sound-a-like	Episode: "Too Good to Be True"
1999	Rocky Marciano	Allie Colombo	Television film
1999	Time of Your Life	Tony	2 episodes
1999	Batman Beyond	Kidnapper (voice)	Episode: "Rebirth"
1999	NASCAR Racers	Carlos "Stunts" Rey (voice)	
1999–2000	Roughnecks: Starship Troopers Chronicles	Johnny Rico (voice)	Main role; 13 episodes
1999–2001	Spider-Man Unlimited	Peter Parker / Spider-Man, Hector Jones / Green Goblin (voice)	Main role; 13 episodes
2000	Zorro: Generation Z	Bernardo (voice)	26 episodes
2000	Malibu, CA	DJ (voice)	Episode: "Jason's Deal"
2000	The Angry Beavers	Wayne (voice)	Episode: "Canucks Amuck"
2000–2002	Backstory	Narrator (voice)	Main role; 16 episodes
2000–2003	NYPD Blue	Greg Knapp / Frank Genova	2 episodes
2001	Cleopatra: The Film That Changed Hollywood	Narrator	TV documentary
2002	Boomtown	Paul Turcotte in 1976	Episode: "Reelin' in the Years"
2002	Playboy: Inside the Playboy Mansion	Announcer	TV documentary
2002	Totally Spies!	Robby Guthrie (voice)	Episode: "Spies vs. Spies"
2002	What's New, Scooby-Doo?	Captain Treesdale, Keith Dale (voice)	Episode: "Space Ape at the Cape"
2002	Ozzy & Drix	Jude (voice)	Episode: "Where There's Smoke"
2002	Grim & Evil	Destructicus Con Carne (voice)	Episode: "The Time Hole Incident"
2003	Halloween: A Cut Above the Rest	Narrator	TV documentary
2003	As Told by Ginger	Radio Announcer, Student (voice)	Episode: "Wicked Game"
2003	Samurai Jack	Thief, Robot (voice)	Episode: "Jack and the Labyrinth"
2003	Spider-Man: The New Animated Series	Various voices	4 episodes
2003	Teen Titans	Kai (voice)	Episode: "Sisters"
2003	Evil Con Carne	Destructicus Con Carne (voice)	Episode: "Son of Evil"
2004	Biography	Narrator (voice)	Episode: "Jayne Mansfield: Blonde Ambition"
2004	Jackie Chan Adventures	Charlie (voice)	Episode: "Dragon Scouts"
2004–2008	The Batman	Bruce Wayne / Batman (voice)	Main role
2005	The Grim Adventures of Billy & Mandy	Javier, Guillermo (voice)	Episode: "Ecto-Cooler/The Schlubs"
2006	Primetime Pets	Narrator	TV documentary
2006	The Science of Superman	Narrator	TV documentary
2007–2022	Curious George	The Narrator, Dog Owner, Newsreel Announcer, Fair Announcer	Main role; 198 episodes
2007	All Grown Up!	Didier, Joe (voice)	Episode: "O Bro, Where Art Thou?"
2008–2009	Spaceballs: The Animated Series	Lone Starr (voice)	Main role; 14 episodes
2009	Surviving a Super Tumor	Narrator	Television film
2009	Curious George: A Very Monkey Christmas	Narrator (voice)	
2010	CSI: Crime Scene Investigation	Sqweegel (voice)	Episode: "Squeegel"
2012	How Playboy Changed the World	Narrator / Himself	TV documentary
2013	VO Buzz Weekly	Himself	2 episodes
2013	Phineas and Ferb	Additional voices	Episode: "Sidetracked"
2016	Rolling with the Ronks!	Walter (voice)	Pilot episode

=== Video games ===
Year	Title	Voice role	Notes
1998	Star Wars Jedi Knight: Mysteries of the Sith	Kyle Katarn	
1999	Revenant	Cameron, Jason, Townsmen	
2000	Star Trek: Voyager – Elite Force	Ensign Alexander Munro	
2000	Spider-Man	Peter Parker / Spider-Man, Thug	
2001	Spider-Man 2: Enter Electro	Peter Parker / Spider-Man, Palooka, Police Announcer	
2001	X-Men: Mutant Academy 2	Peter Parker / Spider-Man	
2001	Arcanum: Of Steamworks and Magick Obscura	Virgil	
2001	Zoog Genius: Math, Science, & Technology	Male Host	
2002	Bruce Lee: Quest of the Dragon	Additional voices	
2002	The Scorpion King: Rise of the Akkadian	Rama, Village Chief, Soldier #2	
2002	Eternal Darkness: Sanity's Requiem	Karim, Guard	
2003	Star Wars: Knights of the Old Republic	Revan, additional voices	
2003	Star Trek: Elite Force II	Lt. Alexander Munro	
2003	X2: Wolverine's Revenge	Peter Parker / Spider-Man	Uncredited cameo
2004	Syphon Filter: The Omega Strain	Jean Fournier, Guard B, Driver	
2004	Pitfall: The Lost Expedition	Quickclaw, Guard #1	
2005	Doom 3: Resurrection of Evil	Additional Voices	
2005	Resident Evil 4	Luis Sera	
2006	Just Cause	Josë Caramicas	
2006	Lara Croft Tomb Raider: Legend	James Rutland	
2013	Skylanders: Swap Force	Scorp	
2014	Skylanders: Trap Team	Scorp	
2015	Skylanders: SuperChargers	Scorp	
2016	Skylanders: Imaginators	Scorp, King Pen	
2020	Yakuza: Like a Dragon	Reiji Ishioda	

Preceded by None	Voice of Tuxedo Mask; 1995	Succeeded by Toby Proctor
Preceded by Christopher Daniel Barnes	Voice of Spider-Man; 1999–2001	Succeeded by Neil Patrick Harris
Preceded by Kevin Conroy	Voice of Batman; 2004–2008	Succeeded by Jeremy Sisto
