= Vince Corazza =

Canadian actor

- Born: Newmarket, Ontario, Canada
- Occupation: Actor
- Years active: 1993–present

Vincent Corazza is a Canadian actor, known for playing the roles of Alden Jones in the television series Braceface, Mr. Schickadance on the Ace Ventura animated series and Darien Shields/Tuxedo Mask in the anime Sailor Moon.

== Career ==
Corazza began acting at the age of 10. His credits include the 2003 feature film, Owning Mahowny as well as the television film The Cheetah Girls for the Disney Channel. Other credits include guest appearances on The Famous Jett Jackson, 24, CSI: Crime Scene Investigation, JAG and Without a Trace, and a December 2006 appearance on the daytime drama General Hospital.

Notable vocal/animation credits include Alden on Braceface, Tuxedo Mask (CWi dub) and Alan (DiC dub) of Sailor Moon, Sam Sparks in Rescue Heroes, and Mr. Shickadance in Ace Ventura: Pet Detective. He was also the voice of U.B.C.S. mercenary Carlos Oliveira in the PlayStation video game Resident Evil 3: Nemesis, and the voice of Zexion in the Kingdom Hearts video game series.

Corazza played the lead animated character of Slim in the IMAX feature Adventures in Animation 3D.

Corazza also had a role in the horror film Bless the Child.

Corazza acted as Harry Bright on the US National tour of Mamma Mia!, and also was a part of the original Broadway production of Rocky in 2014. In 2015, he took on the role of male lead in Music Theater of Wichita's stage adaptation of Big Fish (July 2015). Corazza plays the part of Edward Bloom, a father who raised his son on fantastic and exaggerated stories.

== Filmography ==
=== Film ===
| Year | Title | Role | Notes |
|---|---|---|---|
| 1994 | Getting Gotti | Charlie | Uncredited, television film |
| 1997 | When Innocence Is Lost | Scott Stone | Television film |
| 1997 | Love and Death on Long Island | Corey | |
| 1998 | Urban Legend | David Evans | |
| 1998 | Bride of Chucky | Robert Bailey | |
| 1998 | Universal Soldier III: Unfinished Business | Lowell/GR85 | Television film |
| 1999 | Ultimate Deception | Det. Gary Falstorm | Television film |
| 1999 | Bonanno: A Godfather's Story | Charlie "Lucky" Luciano | Television film |
| 2000 | Bless the Child | Reverend's Assistant | |
| 2000 | Sailor Moon R: The Movie | Darien Shields/Tuxedo Mask (voice) | Pioneer/Optimum Productions dub |
| 2000 | Sailor Moon S: The Movie | Darien Shields/Tuxedo Mask (voice) | Pioneer/Optimum Productions dub |
| 2000 | Sailor Moon Super S: The Movie | Darien Shields/Tuxedo Mask (voice) | Pioneer/Optimum Productions dub |
| 2001 | Jett Jackson: The Movie | Plunkett | Television film |
| 2001 | Zebra Lounge | Neil Bradley | |
| 2001 | Danger Beneath the Sea | Lt. Commander Eric Watkins | Television film |
| 2002 | Leaving Metropolis | Matt | |
| 2002 | You Stupid Man | Jeffery | |
| 2003 | Soldier's Girl | Lester | |
| 2003 | Owning Mahowny | Doug | |
| 2003 | The Cheetah Girls | Jackal Johnson | Television film |
| 2004 | I Downloaded a Ghost | Jared | Television film |

=== Television ===
| Year | Title | Role | Notes |
|---|---|---|---|
| 1995 | TekWar | Michael Del Amo | Episode: "Deep Cover" |
| 1995 | Due South | Lenny | Episode: "Vault" |
| 1995–2000 | Sailor Moon | Darien Shields/Tuxedo Mask (voice) | CWi English dub |
| 1995–1996 | Ace Ventura: Pet Detective | Shickadance (voice) | 3 episodes |
| 1997 | F/X: The Series | Quinn Proffet | Episode: "Bad Influence" |
| 1998 | Eerie, Indiana: The Other Dimension | Armondo | Episode: "Standard Deviation" |
| 1998 | Nothing Too Good for a Cowboy | Drunken Cowboy | Television film |
| 1998–2000 | The Famous Jett Jackson | Plunkett | 2 episodes |
| 1999 | Mythic Warriors | Cilix (voice) | 2 episodes |
| 1999 | Total Recall 2070 | James Tate | 2 episodse |
| 1999 | Psi Factor | Calvin Finch | Episode: "Tribunal" |
| 1999 | La Femme Nikita | Boris, Prisoner | 2 episodes |
| 1999–2001 | Earth: Final Conflict | Combs, Rick | 2 episodes |
| 2000 | Traders | John Mills | Episode: "The Running of the Bulls" |
| 2001 | Beyblade | Steve, Robert Jurgen, Gustav (voice) | English dub |
| 2001 | Haven | Cody | Television film |
| 2001 | The Guardian | John Feeney | Episode: "Pilot" |
| 2001–2005 | Braceface | Alden Jones (voice) | Main cast |
| 2001 | MythQuest | Giacomo | Episode: "The Doppelganger" |
| 2001–2002 | Rescue Heroes | Sam Sparks (voice) | 8 episodes |
| 2002 | Adventure Inc. | Logan Kincaid | Episode: "Message from the Deep" |
| 2002 | Soul Food | James | 2 episodes |
| 2003–2004 | 24 | Tyler | 2 episodes |
| 2003 | CSI: Crime Scene Investigation | Car Rental Representative | Episode: "Grissom Versus the Volcano" |
| 2004 | Line of Fire | James Lawson | Episode: "The Best-Laid Plans" |
| 2004 | JAG | Jimmy Bingham | Episode: "Trojan Horse" |
| 2004 | Without a Trace | Chuck Whiting | Episode: "Gung-Ho" |
| 2004 | What's New, Scooby-Doo? | Zeke Zillion (voice) | Episode: "Simple Plan and the Invisible Madman" |
| 2004 | American Dreams | Mike | Episode: "Tidings of Comfort and Joy" |
| 2005 | NYPD Blue | Ray Quinn | Episode: "Moving Day" |
| 2005 | Strong Medicine | Dino Benedetti | Episode: "Rhythm of the Heart" |
| 2006 | Stargate SG-1 | Worrel | Episode: "Off the Grid" |
| 2009 | Lie to Me | Deputy Whitmore | Episode: "Moral Waiver" |
| 2009 | The Young and the Restless | Nolan Grimes | 1 episode |
| 2009 | Entourage | Manager | Episode: "No More Drama" |
| 2011 | Supah Ninjas | Mallini the Magnificent | Episode: "The Magnificent" |

=== Video games ===
| Year | Title | Role | Notes |
|---|---|---|---|
| 1993 | Global Domination | Agent Orion | |
| 1999 | Resident Evil 3: Nemesis | Carlos Oliveira | |
| 2004 | EverQuest II | Additional voices | |
| 2005 | Ultimate Spider-Man | Additional voices | |
| 2008 | Kingdom Hearts Re:Chain of Memories | Zexion | |
| 2009 | Kingdom Hearts 358/2 Days | Zexion | Archive and new footage |
| 2010 | White Knight Chronicles: International Edition | Caesar | |
| 2011 | White Knight Chronicles II | Caesar | |
| 2012 | Kingdom Hearts 3D: Dream Drop Distance | Ienzo | |
| 2012 | Assassin's Creed III | Marquis de Lafayette | |
| 2013 | Kingdom Hearts HD 1.5 Remix | Zexion | Archive footage |
| 2014 | Kingdom Hearts HD 2.5 Remix | Zexion, Ienzo | Archive and new footage |
| 2017 | Kingdom Hearts HD 2.8 Final Chapter Prologue | Ienzo | Archive footage |
| 2019 | Kingdom Hearts III | Ienzo | |
| 2020 | Kingdom Hearts: Melody of Memory | Ienzo | |

| Preceded by Toby Proctor | Voice of Tuxedo Mask; Eps. 66 - 159, Movies | Succeeded by Robbie Daymond |
