= Sailor Moon R: The Movie =

1993 film by Kunihiko Ikuhara

- Theatrical release poster
- Japanese: 劇場版 美少女戦士セーラームーンR
- Literal meaning: Pretty Soldier Sailor Moon R: The Movie
- Revised Hepburn: Gekijō-ban Bishōjo Senshi Sērā Mūn Āru
- Directed by: Kunihiko Ikuhara
- Screenplay by: Sukehiro Tomita
- Based on: Sailor Moon by Naoko Takeuchi
- Produced by: Iriya Azuma
- Starring: Kotono Mitsuishi; Aya Hisakawa; Michie Tomizawa; Emi Shinohara; Rika Fukami; Tōru Furuya; Hikaru Midorikawa
- Cinematography: Motoi Takahashi
- Edited by: Yasuhiro Yoshikawa
- Music by: Takanori Arisawa
- Production company: Toei Animation
- Distributed by: Toei Company
- Release date: December 5, 1993
- Running time: 61 minutes
- Country: Japan
- Language: Japanese
- Box office: ¥1.3 billion

Sailor Moon R: The Movie (Note: Originally released in Japan as Pretty Soldier Sailor Moon R: The Movie (Japanese: 劇場版 美少女戦士セーラームーンR, Hepburn: Gekijō-ban Bishōjo Senshi Sērā Mūn Āru), and later as Pretty Guardian Sailor Moon R: The Movie. Released in the U.S. as Sailor Moon R: The Movie – Promise of the Rose on the Pioneer Entertainment dub in 2000, and simply Sailor Moon R: The Movie on the Viz media re-dub in 2017.) is a 1993 Japanese animated superhero fantasy film directed by Kunihiko Ikuhara and written by Sukehiro Tomita, based on the Sailor Moon manga series by Naoko Takeuchi. Produced by Toei Animation, the film takes its name from the second season of the anime television series. It follows the Sailor Guardians as they confront Fiore, an alien connected to Mamoru Chiba who threatens Earth under the influence of the Xenian Flower. The film features Kotono Mitsuishi as the voice of Sailor Moon.

The film was released in Japan on December 5, 1993, alongside the short film Make Up! Sailor Guardians. It subsequently received home-video releases in North America through Pioneer Entertainment and a limited theatrical release in 2017 through Viz Media and Eleven Arts, featuring a new English dub.

It is the first theatrical film in the Sailor Moon franchise and was followed by Sailor Moon S: The Movie (1994) and Sailor Moon SuperS: The Movie (1995).

== Plot ==
=== Make Up! Sailor Guardians ===
Usagi and Chibiusa overhear two girls talking about the Sailor Guardians after they see a poster. As the girls debate over the smartest, most elegant, strongest, and the leader of the Sailor Guardians, Usagi grandly claims those titles for herself. Chibiusa shakes her head at Usagi's delusion. Clips appear from the debut of each Sailor Guardian, and that girl's image song plays in the background. When even Tuxedo Mask has been mentioned, and the girls are about to leave, Usagi butts in on their conversation and asks them directly about Sailor Moon. The girls give a series of glowing compliments about Sailor Moon, but unlike their analysis of the other Sailor Guardians, they also list her faults. After the girls leave, Usagi sarcastically apologizes to the viewers for being a clumsy cry-baby and then bursts into exaggerated tears.

=== Sailor Moon R: The Movie ===
A young Mamoru Chiba hands a mysterious boy a rose before he disappears, vowing to bring Mamoru a flower in return. In the present, Mamoru visits the Jindai Botanical Garden with Usagi Tsukino and the Sailor Guardians. The stranger appears from the garden's fountain and takes Mamoru's hands into his own. Uncomfortable, Usagi tries to break the man's grasp from Mamoru but is knocked down. The man vows that no one will prevent him from keeping his promise before disappearing again. Mamoru tells Usagi that the stranger's name is Fiore (フィオレ, Fiore). At Rei Hino's temple, the Sailor Guardians discuss an asteroid that has started to approach Earth and on which Luna and Artemis have discovered traces of vegetal life.

Fiore sends his flower-monster henchwoman, Glycina (グリシナ), to Tokyo to drain the population's life energy, but the Sailor Guardians free them and destroy the monster. Fiore appears and uses a flower called a Xenian (キセニアン, Kisenian) before severely injuring the Sailor Guardians. Mamoru attempts to dissuade Fiore from fighting, but the Xenian controls Fiore's mind. After Mamoru intercepts his attack to save Usagi, Fiore takes an unconscious Mamoru to the rapidly approaching asteroid and begins to revive him in a crystal filled with liquid.

While inside the crystal, Mamoru remembers finding Fiore outside the hospital where he was staying after his parents died in a car accident. Mamoru had previously assumed that he had made up the boy as an imaginary friend. Fiore explains that he had to leave Mamoru because he cannot survive long on Earth's atmosphere; Mamoru gave Fiore a rose before disappearing. Fiore searched the galaxy to find a flower for Mamoru, finding the Xenian in the process. Seeking revenge on the humans for his loneliness, Fiore returned to Earth.

Luna and Artemis tell the Sailor Guardians that the Xenian can destroy planets by possessing weak-hearted people. Ami Mizuno discovers that the energy from the asteroid matches the flower monster's evil energy, deducing that Fiore has hidden there. The Sailor Guardians set out to rescue Mamoru. After the Sailor Guardians fly to the asteroid, Fiore reveals his plans to scatter flower seeds to drain humanity's energy on Earth. The Sailor Guardians fight hundreds of flower monsters, but Sailors Mercury, Mars, Jupiter, and Venus are captured. When Fiore orders Sailor Moon to surrender, she does so, unable to watch her friends suffer. Surprised, Fiore is persuaded by the Xenian to fuse with him and drain Sailor Moon's life force. Mamoru escapes and saves Sailor Moon by throwing a rose at Fiore's chest, freeing him from the Xenian's control.

The flowers on the asteroid disappear, but it changes its course to Earth. When Fiore announces plans to crash the asteroid into the Earth, Usagi uses the Silver Crystal to transform into Princess Serenity and redirect the asteroid. Fiore attempts to stop Usagi, but upon coming into contact with the Silver Crystal, he sees a vision that reveals to him that the rose Mamoru gave him as a child originally came from Usagi, who had brought a bouquet of roses to the hospital to celebrate her younger brother's birth. Stunned by this revelation, Fiore allows the Xenian and himself to be vaporized by the Silver Crystal's powers. Serenity, Prince Endymion, and the Sailor Guardians combine their powers to divert the asteroid away from Earth. The Silver Crystal is shattered, killing Serenity.

With the asteroid now safely drifting in Earth's orbit, the Sailor Guardians and Tuxedo Mask are devastated by Sailor Moon's death. The spirit of Fiore reappears and thanks Tuxedo Mask and his comrades for freeing him. Using a nectar-filled flower with Fiore's life energy, Tuxedo Mask wets his lips with the nectar and kisses Sailor Moon, reviving her, restoring her transformation brooch, and repowering the Silver Crystal. Fiore, reduced to the form of a child again, ascends to the afterlife to live in peace. As Sailor Moon awakens, she says she told them she would protect everyone. The Sailor Guardians smile through their tears and collapse into her arms.

== Voice cast ==
Character	Japanese voice actor	English dubbing actor (Pioneer/Optimum Productions, 2000)	English dubbing actor (Viz Media/Studiopolis, 2017)
Usagi Tsukino/Sailor Moon	Kotono Mitsuishi	Serena Tsukino	Stephanie Sheh
Usagi Tsukino/Sailor Moon	Kotono Mitsuishi	Terri Hawkes	Stephanie Sheh
Ami Mizuno/Sailor Mercury	Aya Hisakawa	Amy Anderson	Kate Higgins
Ami Mizuno/Sailor Mercury	Aya Hisakawa	Karen Bernstein	Kate Higgins
Rei Hino/Sailor Mars	Michie Tomizawa	Raye Hino	Cristina Valenzuela
Rei Hino/Sailor Mars	Michie Tomizawa	Katie Griffin	Cristina Valenzuela
Makoto Kino/Sailor Jupiter	Emi Shinohara	Lita Kino	Amanda C. Miller
Makoto Kino/Sailor Jupiter	Emi Shinohara	Susan Roman	Amanda C. Miller
Minako Aino/Sailor Venus	Rika Fukami	Mina Aino	Cherami Leigh
Minako Aino/Sailor Venus	Rika Fukami	Stephanie Morgenstern	Cherami Leigh
Mamoru Chiba/Tuxedo Mask	Toru Furuya Megumi Ogata (young)	Darien Shields	Robbie Daymond
Mamoru Chiba/Tuxedo Mask	Toru Furuya Megumi Ogata (young)	Vincent Corazza Julie Lemieux (young)	Robbie Daymond
Luna	Keiko Han	Jill Frappier	Michelle Ruff
Artemis	Yasuhiro Takato	Ron Rubin	Johnny Yong Bosch
Usagi "Chibiusa" Tsukino	Kae Araki	Serena "Rini" Tsukino	Sandy Fox
Usagi "Chibiusa" Tsukino	Kae Araki	Tracey Hoyt	Sandy Fox
Fiore	Hikaru Midorikawa Tomoko Maruo (young)	Steven Bednarski Nadine Rabinovitch (young)	Benjamin Diskin
Xenian Flower	Yumi Tōma	Kisenian Blossom	Carrie Keranen
Xenian Flower	Yumi Tōma	Catherine Disher	Carrie Keranen

=== Make-up! Sailor Guardians ===
Character	Japanese	English
Yui	Chieko Nanba	Carrie Keranen
Aya	Rumi Kasahara	Cherami Leigh
Garoben	Hiroko Emori	Megan Hollingshead
Katarina	Yūko Mita	Veronica Taylor
Queen Beryl	Keiko Han	Cindy Robinson
Alan	Keiichi Nanba	Wally Wingert
Queen Serenity	Mika Doi	Wendee Lee

== Production ==
The film shared several production staff members with the Sailor Moon R television series, including Kunihiko Ikuhara, who directed the film, and Kazuko Tadano, who handled character design and animation direction. Sukehiro Tomita wrote the screenplay.

Plans for a theatrical adaptation of Sailor Moon emerged in early 1993, although Toei initially expressed concerns about the commercial viability of a film primarily aimed at young girls. A summer release was considered, but production did not begin until August 1993, leaving the staff with a short production schedule. The film was initially scheduled for release on December 11, 1993, before being brought forward to December 5.

Several story concepts were considered during planning, including an adaptation closer to the original manga, the inclusion of super-deformed versions of the Sailor Guardians, and a programme consisting of three new animated features. The filmmakers eventually settled on a standalone story centred on Mamoru Chiba and Fiore, whose relationship had an even greater emphasis in early versions of the screenplay.

The compressed production schedule required considerable efforts from the animation staff. Director Kunihiko Ikuhara temporarily withdrew from his work on the television series to concentrate on the film and rented accommodation near Toei Animation's studio. Other staff members similarly stayed near the studio during the final stages of production.

Ikuhara later described love as the film's central theme. He had noticed the frequent use of flowers as imagery in the television series and decided to use them in the film as a representation of love. According to Ikuhara, Fiore initially understands love as something in which the affection one gives should be returned equally, while the story gradually distinguishes this from the more selfless form of love represented by Usagi and her relationships with the other Sailor Guardians.

Although the film was made primarily for children, Ikuhara said that he did not want to simplify its ideas for its young audience and instead wanted to give viewers an experience that would surprise them. He also used the theatrical format to attempt techniques that would have been impractical on television, including an approximately 20-second sequence without dialogue or sound. Ikuhara regarded the placement of the song "Moon Revenge" during the climax as particularly important in directing the audience's emotional response toward supporting Sailor Moon and the other Guardians.

The film's music collection was released by Forte Music Entertainment on December 21, 1993. It included "Moon Revenge", written by Kayoko Fuyumori, composed by Akiko Kosaka and performed by the five principal Sailor Guardian voice actresses.

== Release ==
=== Japanese release ===
The film was released in Japanese theaters on December 5, 1993, alongside a 15-minute short recap episode titled Make Up! Sailor Soldier (メイクアップ!セーラー戦士, Meikuappu! Sērā senshi; later as Make Up! Sailor Guardians) and an unrelated short film based on the anime Tsuyoshi Shikkari Shinasai.

On June 30, 2017, an HD-remastered version of the film received a special audience-participation screening at Marunouchi Toei in Tokyo, celebrating the 25th anniversary of Sailor Moon and the birthday of Usagi Tsukino. The anniversary celebrations continued on July 1 with a screening and discussion featuring director Kunihiko Ikuhara and voice actress Kotono Mitsuishi.

The film was released on VHS by Toei on July 1, 1994. On March 21, 2002, Toei Video included the film and its accompanying short Make Up! Sailor Guardians in the Japanese Sailor Moon DVD-BOX The Movie, alongside the other two theatrical films. A standalone DVD edition followed on December 10, 2004, distributed by Toei Video, which also included the short film Make Up! Sailor Guardians. On February 7, 2018, the film was released on Blu-ray as part of a Japanese collection of the three theatrical films, under the title Pretty Guardian Sailor Moon R: The Movie.

=== French release ===
The film was released theatrically in France on 15 May 1996. The French theatrical version was edited to remove certain scenes, while the Japanese-language song "Moon Revenge" was omitted from the climactic sequence. The accompanying short film Make Up! Sailor Guardians was also excluded from the French theatrical presentation. The June 1996 issue of French magazine Mega Force covered the release and featured a promotional competition organised with AB Films Distribution, offering cinema tickets and Sailor Moon T-shirts as prizes.

Following its French theatrical release, the film was released on VHS by Shuriken on 8 April 1997. On 24 September 2014, Kazé released the film on DVD in France under the title Sailor Moon R: Le Film. The release featured Japanese and French audio tracks, French subtitles and the short film Make Up! Sailor Guardians as a bonus feature. The DVD was promoted as containing an uncut version of the film. On January 20, 2016, Kazé included the film in a French DVD box set alongside Sailor Moon S: The Movie, Sailor Moon SuperS: The Movie and the Sailor Moon SuperS television special.

=== Other European territories ===
In Spain, the film was distributed on VHS by Manga Films under the title Sailor Moon: La película, featuring a Spanish dub recorded in 1997 at Triveu in Barcelona.

In Germany, the film premiered on RTL II on 12 June 1998 under the title Sailor Moon: Gefährliche Blumen. It was released on VHS by Edel under the title Gefährliche Blumen.

In Poland, the film was released on VHS by Planet Manga in 1998, featuring a Polish voice-over. On 7 August 2015, Anime Eden released a DVD edition featuring a new Polish dub, Japanese audio and Polish subtitles. The release also included the short film Make Up! Sailor Guardians.

In Italy, the film was released on DVD by Shin Vision, featuring a new Italian dub. On 23 November 2011, Dynit released a further DVD edition under the title Sailor Moon R The Movie – La promessa della rosa, following a postponement from its originally scheduled September release.

=== English-speaking territories ===
The film was first released in North America on VHS by Pioneer Entertainment on August 31, 1999, in Japanese with English subtitles. In February 2000, it was screened at the New York International Children's Film Festival, where it was advertised as the world premiere of its English-language version. Pioneer subsequently released an uncut bilingual DVD and an edited English-dubbed VHS on February 8, 2000.

In 2014, Viz Media acquired the North American distribution rights and commissioned a new English dub. The film received a special theatrical premiere at the Theatre at Ace Hotel in Los Angeles on January 13, 2017, followed by a wider limited release in more than 300 American cinemas in association with Eleven Arts. The screenings included the short film Make Up! Sailor Guardians. Viz released the remastered film on DVD and Blu-ray on April 18, 2017. In July 2018, the film returned to American cinemas as a double feature with Sailor Moon S: The Movie, presented by Fathom Events on July 28 and 30. On February 11, 2025, Viz Media re-released the film as part of the Sailor Moon: Three-Film Collection Blu-ray set, alongside Sailor Moon S: The Movie and Sailor Moon SuperS: The Movie.

In Australia and New Zealand, the film was licensed by Madman Entertainment, which released the film on DVD In Australia on 7 June 2017, featuring English and Japanese audio tracks. On August 22, 2017, the Japan Foundation in Sydney hosted a free screening in Japanese with English subtitles. An Australian Blu-ray edition was also released by Madman Entertainment by July 2018. On November 3, 2021, Madman included the film in a three-film Blu-ray collection alongside Sailor Moon S: The Movie and Sailor Moon SuperS: The Movie.

== Reception ==
Rebecca Silverman of Anime News Network gave the film's Viz Media dub an "A−". She praised the animation, stating that it was "several cuts above what we typically see in the TV series". She also praised the film for distilling the franchise's themes effectively, its soundtrack and use of imagery relating to flowers. Charles Solomon of the Los Angeles Times also reacted positively to the film's portrayal of the main characters' "sisterly friendship" and praised Viz Media's dub for not censoring Fiore's implied feelings for Mamoru, unlike previous English translations.

=== Commercial performance ===
The theatrical programme comprising Sailor Moon R: The Movie, Make Up! Sailor Guardians and a short film based on Tsuyoshi Shikkari Shinasai earned ¥1.3 billion in distributor rentals. According to the Motion Picture Producers Association of Japan, the programme ranked seventh among domestic Japanese films in its 1994 annual rankings. In France, the film's 1996 theatrical release was considered a commercial failure, attracting approximately 17,000 admissions in Paris. French animation-history website Planète Jeunesse attributed its poor performance to limited promotion, a last-minute theatrical release decision and its scheduling during school examination periods.

== Legacy ==
The film played a role in the casting of Megumi Ogata as Shinji Ikari in Neon Genesis Evangelion. Ogata, who voiced Mamoru Chiba as a child in Sailor Moon R: The Movie, later recalled that Evangelion director Hideaki Anno personally approached her during a Sailor Moon staff trip and asked her to audition for the role. Retrospective accounts have attributed Anno's interest in Ogata to her performance as the young Mamoru in the film.

In 2020, Sailor Moon R: The Movie ranked first in the favorite episode category of NHK's All Sailor Moon Anime Grand Poll, ahead of episodes from across the television anime and the other theatrical films. The film's insert song "Moon Revenge" ranked third in the poll's song category.
