= Sailor Moon SuperS: The Movie =

1995 film by Hiroki Shibata

- Theatrical release poster
- Japanese: 美少女戦士セーラームーンSuperS(スーパーズ) セーラー9戦士集結！ブラック・ドリーム・ホールの奇跡
- Literal meaning: Pretty Soldier Sailor Moon SuperS: The Nine Sailor Soldiers Unite! Miracle of the Black Dream Hole
- Revised Hepburn: Bishōjo Senshi Sērā Mūn Sūpāzu: Sērā Kyū Senshi Shūketsu! Burakku Dorīmu Hōru no Kiseki
- Directed by: Hiroki Shibata
- Screenplay by: Yōji Enokido
- Based on: Sailor Moon by Naoko Takeuchi
- Produced by: Toshihiko Arisako; Go Yamamoto
- Starring: Kotono Mitsuishi; Kae Araki; Tōru Furuya
- Cinematography: Motoi Takahashi
- Edited by: Yasuhiro Yoshikawa
- Music by: Takanori Arisawa
- Production company: Toei Animation
- Distributed by: Toei Company
- Release date: December 23, 1995
- Running time: 60 minutes
- Country: Japan
- Language: Japanese

Sailor Moon SuperS: The Movie (Note: Originally released in Japan as Pretty Soldier Sailor Moon SuperS: The Nine Sailor Soldiers Unite! Miracle of the Black Dream Hole (Japanese: 美少女戦士セーラームーンSuperS(スーパーズ) セーラー9戦士集結！ブラック・ドリーム・ホールの奇跡, Hepburn: Bishōjo Senshi Sērā Mūn Sūpāzu: Sērā Kyū Senshi Shūketsu! Burakku Dorīmu Hōru no Kiseki), and later as Pretty Guardian Sailor Moon SuperS: The Nine Sailor Guardians Unite! Miracle of the Black Dream Hole. Released in the U.S. as Sailor Moon SuperS: The Movie: Black Dream Hole in the Pioneer Entertainment dub in 2000, and simply as Sailor Moon SuperS: The Movie in Viz media re-dub.) is a 1995 Japanese animated superhero fantasy film directed by Hiroki Shibata and written by Yōji Enokido. Produced by Toei Animation and based on the Sailor Moon manga series by Naoko Takeuchi, it is the third and final film in the original theatrical trilogy, following Sailor Moon R: The Movie (1993) and Sailor Moon S: The Movie (1994). The film takes its name from Sailor Moon SuperS, the fourth season of the anime television series, which was airing at the time.

The film follows the Sailor Guardians as they attempt to rescue Chibiusa and other children abducted by the evil queen Badiane, who intends to harness their dreams to create a black hole. The Japanese voice cast includes Kotono Mitsuishi as Sailor Moon, alongside Kae Araki and Tōru Furuya. The film was released theatrically in Japan on December 23, 1995, accompanied by the 16-minute short film Sailor Moon SuperS Plus: Ami's First Love. (Note: Stylized on-screen as Special Present - Ami's First Love - Sailor Moon SuperS Side Story (スペシャルプレゼント 亜美ちゃんの初恋 美少女戦士セーラームーンSuperS外伝, Supesharu Purezento Ami-chan no Hatsu-koi Bishōjo Senshi Sērā Mūn Sūpāzu Gaiden))

== Plot ==
=== Ami's First Love ===
Japanese theaters showed a 16-minute short before the Sailor Moon SuperS film, titled Ami's First Love (Ami-chan no Hatsukoi), in which Ami Mizuno (Sailor Mercury) struggles to focus on her studying amidst various distractions including a pruritus-inducing love letter found in her school locker and a rival known as "Mercurius" who ties Ami's perfect score in mock high school entrance exams, and who Ami believes is either a female monster that makes her forget math and English or a handsome boy who looks like a young Albert Einstein. The short featured a new transformation sequence into her evolved Super form (Mercury Crystal Power Make Up!) and a greater water-based attack (Mercury Aqua Mirage) for Super Sailor Mercury.

=== Sailor Moon SuperS: The Movie ===
Somewhere in Europe, a young man named Poupelin (ププラン, Pupuran) plays a song on his flute to hypnotize children, following him into an airship before sailing off into the sky. In Tokyo, Usagi Tsukino, Chibiusa, and the other girls bake cookies together at Makoto Kino's apartment. Later, on her way to give her cookies to Mamoru Chiba, Chibiusa meets and befriends a boy standing outside a sweets shop. He causes some of the treats inside the shop window to dance by playing a tune on his flute before introducing himself as Perle (ペルル, Peruru). Chibiusa gives her cookies to Perle before they part ways. Meanwhile, Usagi visits Mamoru with her cookies asks him who is more important to him, herself or Chibiusa, but he becomes nervous and does not answer. They hear a report on the radio about the mass disappearance of children all over the world.

That night, Chibiusa suddenly wakes up and begins walking through the city. Usagi and the other girls follow Chibiusa and the other children. They save Chibiusa but are accosted by Poupelin and his "Bonbon Babies". Queen Badiane (女王バディヤーヌ, Jo'ō Badiyānu) orders Poupelin and her other henchmen Banane (バナーヌ, Banānu) and Orangeat (オランジャ, Oranja) to hurry up. Perle says that he no longer believes in her, but she orders that Chibiusa be captured. The ship lands, along with two others, in Marzipan Castle. Upon arrival, the children run out into the darkness, except for Chibiusa. Looking into the shadows, she witnesses "Dream Coffins", each containing a sleeping child. Badiane lifts her into the air, commenting on the energy she senses from Chibiusa, and explains her purpose. In the castle's center, a massive Black Dream Hole is forming, gathering the magical "sugar energy" of the sleeping children. It will eventually overtake Earth, and all humans will enter into Dream Coffins.

Perle leads the other Sailor Guardians to an airship of his own. He tells them that Badiane promised that the children would be happy and safe in her world of dreams and where they can remain children indefinitely, but he thinks also of Chibiusa, his friend. As they reach the castle, they are attacked, and after crash-landing, fight Poupelin, Banane, and Orangeat, as well as three sets of Bonbon Babies. As the Guardians are joined by Sailors Uranus, Neptune, and Pluto, they destroy the flutes of the three fairies, changing them into small birds. The Guardians infiltrate the castle and confront Queen Badiane, who has drained enough dream energy from the children, including Chibiusa, to create the Black Dream Hole. The power drain is enough to force all the Sailor Guardians except Sailor Moon into a partial de-transformation, weakening them. Taking Chibiusa with her, Badiane enters the hole itself, and Sailor Moon follows. Sailor Moon then finds herself in Mamoru's apartment, carrying Chibiusa. Mamoru lays her on the bed, then wraps his arms around Sailor Moon and tells her not to worry about anything. She asks him again who is more important to him, herself or Chibiusa; he replies that she is. Sailor Moon takes Chibiusa in her arms, realizes that this experience is just a dream.

As Sailor Moon tries to flee, Queen Badiane demands that she give back Chibiusa. When Sailor Moon refuses, the dark Queen of Dreams assimilates herself into the black dream hole and attacks her with fire. Hearing her mental cry, the other seven Guardians send their power and strength to Sailor Moon, awakening Chibiusa and allowing them to obliterate Queen Badiane with their combined Moon Gorgeous Meditation attack. After the battle, Marzipan Castle is destroyed, and with Perle's help, the six Super Sailor Guardians and three Outer Sailor Guardians escape. The airships, each carrying children, return to Earth.

At a beach, Perle gives Chibiusa his glass flute, telling her that he is the fairy who protects children's dreams, and will always be with her. Chibiusa kisses Perle goodbye on the cheek, and as he flies away, the six Super Sailor Guardians and three Outer Sailor Guardians watch the sun rise.

== Voice cast ==
| Character name | Japanese | English (Pioneer/Optimum Productions, 2000) | English (Viz Media/Studiopolis, 2018) |
|---|---|---|---|
| Usagi Tsukino/Sailor Moon | Kotono Mitsuishi | Serena Tsukino | Stephanie Sheh |
| Usagi Tsukino/Sailor Moon | Kotono Mitsuishi | Terri Hawkes | Stephanie Sheh |
| Ami Mizuno/Sailor Mercury | Aya Hisakawa | Amy Anderson | Kate Higgins |
| Ami Mizuno/Sailor Mercury | Aya Hisakawa | Karen Bernstein | Kate Higgins |
| Rei Hino/Sailor Mars | Michie Tomizawa | Raye Hino | Cristina Valenzuela |
| Rei Hino/Sailor Mars | Michie Tomizawa | Katie Griffin | Cristina Valenzuela |
| Makoto Kino/Sailor Jupiter | Emi Shinohara | Lita Kino | Amanda C. Miller |
| Makoto Kino/Sailor Jupiter | Emi Shinohara | Susan Roman | Amanda C. Miller |
| Minako Aino/Sailor Venus | Rika Fukami | Mina Aino | Cherami Leigh |
| Minako Aino/Sailor Venus | Rika Fukami | Stephanie Morgenstern | Cherami Leigh |
| Mamoru Chiba/Tuxedo Mask | Tōru Furuya | Darien Shields | Robbie Daymond |
| Mamoru Chiba/Tuxedo Mask | Tōru Furuya | Vincent Corazza | Robbie Daymond |
| Usagi "Chibiusa" Tsukino/Sailor Chibi Moon | Kae Araki | Serena "Rini" Tsukino | Sandy Fox |
| Usagi "Chibiusa" Tsukino/Sailor Chibi Moon | Kae Araki | Tracey Hoyt | Sandy Fox |
| Luna | Keiko Han | Jill Frappier | Michelle Ruff |
| Artemis | Yasuhiro Takato | Ron Rubin | Johnny Yong Bosch |
| Diana | Kumiko Nishihara | Naomi Emmerson | Debi Derryberry |
| Haruka Tenoh/Sailor Uranus | Megumi Ogata | Sarah Lafleur | Erica Mendez |
| Michiru Kaioh/Sailor Neptune | Masako Katsuki | Barbara Radecki | Lauren Landa |
| Setsuna Meioh/Sailor Pluto | Chiyoko Kawashima | Sabrina Grdevich | Veronica Taylor |
| Queen Badiane | Rhoko Yoshida | Badiyanu | Tara Sands |
| Queen Badiane | Rhoko Yoshida | Kirsten Bishop | Tara Sands |
| Perle | Chika Sakamoto | Peruru | Colleen O'Shaughnessey |
| Perle | Chika Sakamoto | Julie Lemieux | Colleen O'Shaughnessey |
| Poupelin | Nobuo Tobita | Pupulan | Kyle McCarley |
| Poupelin | Nobuo Tobita | Robert Tinkler | Kyle McCarley |
| Banane | Nobuhiko Kazama | Bananu | Benjamin Diskin |
| Banane | Nobuhiko Kazama | Tony Daniels | Benjamin Diskin |
| Oranget | Kazuya Nakai | Oranja | Robbie Daymond |
| Oranget | Kazuya Nakai | David Berni | Robbie Daymond |
| Bonbon Babies | Ayako Ono; Emi Uwagawa | —N/a | Erica Mendez |

=== Ami's First Love ===
| Character name | Japanese | English |
|---|---|---|
| Kurume Suuri/Mercurius | Nobuyuki Hiyama | Kyle McCarley |
| Bonnone | Kazue Ikura | Colleen O'Shaughnessey |
| Naru Osaka | Shino Kakinuma | Danielle Judovits |
| Gurio Umino | Keiichi Nanba | Benjamin Diskin |
| Instructor | Yasunori Masutani | Steve Kramer |
| Teacher | Tomohisa Aso | Robbie Daymond |

== Production ==
Originally, Kunihiko Ikuhara envisaged that Sailor Uranus and Sailor Neptune were going to be the main characters in the SuperS film, and it was going to be independent of the main series. Sailor Neptune was going to be in a deep sleep at the end of the world, and Sailor Uranus would have had to steal the talismans from the Sailor Soldiers to revive her. However, both Ikuhara and producer Iriya Azuma left the series. Ikuhara later reused these concepts in Revolutionary Girl Utena.

Production of the film was approved in late April 1995. Screenwriter Yōji Enokido developed a story inspired by The Pied Piper of Hamelin, initially submitting a proposal involving the Pied Piper of Torte Castle. In June, producers Toshihiko Arisako and Go Yamamoto, director Hiroki Shibata and original creator Naoko Takeuchi collaborated on the story, deciding to incorporate a sweets-themed setting and feature nine Sailor Guardians. The fourth and final screenplay draft was completed in early July 1995.

The filmmakers also considered including Helios, who appeared as Pegasus in the television series, but Takeuchi expressed reservations about featuring him alongside the film's original character Perle. The possibility of including Sailor Saturn was also discussed, although neither character appeared in the finished film.

The film was directed by Hiroki Shibata, who had also directed the previous film, Sailor Moon S: The Movie. Hisashi Kagawa returned as animation director and also served as character designer, while SuperS writer Yōji Enokido wrote the screenplay.

The film's soundtrack album, Sailor Moon SuperS: Music Collection, was released by Nippon Columbia on December 21, 1995. Composed by Takanori Arisawa, the 16-track album contains music from both the main feature and its accompanying short film, Ami's First Love.

== Release ==
=== Japanese release ===
The film was released in Japanese theaters on December 23, 1995.

To promote the film, a special event train called the Sailor Moon Express II operated between Seibu-Shinjuku Station and Seibu-Yūenchi Station on December 10, 1995. Approximately 1,500 children were selected from around 50,000 applicants to participate. A promotional event at Seibuen Amusement Park featured a Sailor Moon singing competition, a concert by Pretty Cast and a costumed character show.

On December 22, a special preview event titled Fantastic Night was held at Marunouchi Toei, featuring performances by the Sailor Guardian characters, discussions with members of the Japanese voice cast, including Kotono Mitsuishi, and a prize draw.

The film was released on LaserDisc by Toei on July 21, 1996. On March 21, 2002, Toei Video included the film in the Sailor Moon DVD-BOX The Movie collection, alongside the other two theatrical films and their accompanying short films. A standalone DVD edition followed on August 5, 2005, which also included the short film Ami's First Love. On February 7, 2018, the film was released on Blu-ray as part of a Japanese collection of the three theatrical films, under the title Pretty Guardian Sailor Moon SuperS: The Nine Sailor Guardians Unite! Miracle of the Black Dream Hole.

=== European territories ===
In Germany, the film was broadcast on RTL II on October 3, 1998, under the title Reise ins Land der Träume. It was also released on VHS by Edel as volume 12 of the company's Sailor Moon video series.

In Poland, the film was released on VHS by Planet Manga in 1998. On August 24, 2018, Anime Eden released a DVD edition featuring a new Polish dub, Japanese audio and Polish subtitles. The release also included the short film Ami's First Love. The Polish dub was financed through a crowdfunding campaign organised by Anime Eden in 2017.

In Italy, Dynit released the film on DVD in March 2012 under the title Sailor Moon SS The Movie – Il mistero dei sogni.

In France, Kazé released the film on DVD on July 1, 2015, featuring French and Japanese audio. On January 20, 2016, the distributor included the film in a DVD box set alongside Sailor Moon R: The Movie, Sailor Moon S: The Movie and the Sailor Moon SuperS television special.

=== English-speaking territories ===
The film was first released in North America on VHS by Pioneer Entertainment on August 31, 1999, in Japanese with English subtitles. Pioneer subsequently released an uncut bilingual DVD edition on August 15, 2000, alongside a VHS edition containing an edited version of the English dub. Pioneer re-released the DVD on January 6, 2004, under its "Geneon Signature Series" line.

The original English dub was produced by Optimum Productions in Toronto, Canada, featuring several actors from the earlier DIC Entertainment adaptation reprising their roles, including Terri Hawkes, Katie Griffin and Susan Roman. Additional music was credited to Bob Summers.

In 2014, Viz Media acquired the North American distribution rights to the film as part of its licensing of the original Sailor Moon franchise. The company subsequently commissioned a new English dub in association with Los Angeles-based Studiopolis. In association with Fathom Events, Viz Media presented the film at cinemas across the United States in August 2018, with dubbed screenings on August 4 and subtitled screenings on August 6. The screenings also included the short film Ami's First Love.

On February 12, 2019, Viz Media released the film on DVD and Blu-ray in North America. The release presented the film uncut and remastered in high definition, featuring English and Japanese audio tracks, and included Ami's First Love as a bonus feature for the first time on North American home video. On February 11, 2025, Viz Media re-released the film as part of the Sailor Moon: Three-Film Collection Blu-ray set, alongside Sailor Moon R: The Movie and Sailor Moon S: The Movie.

In Australia and New Zealand, the film was licensed by Madman Entertainment. An Australian Blu-ray edition was available by July 2019, featuring English and Japanese audio tracks. On November 3, 2021, Madman included the film in a three-film Blu-ray collection alongside Sailor Moon R: The Movie and Sailor Moon S: The Movie.

== Reception ==
In a retrospective review of the film's 2018 theatrical re-release, Joseph Luster of Otaku USA praised its brisk pacing, action sequences and use of Sailors Uranus, Neptune and Pluto, as well as the improved production values afforded by the theatrical format. He described the film as delivering the kind of compact adventure expected from a feature-length extension of the television series.

Michael S. Mammano of Den of Geek later noted that, of the three original Sailor Moon films, SuperS most closely reflected the themes of its corresponding television season, particularly dreams, childhood innocence and Chibiusa's romantic storyline.

=== Commercial performance ===
The Toei theatrical programme headed by Sailor Moon SuperS: The Movie earned ¥600 million in distributor rentals in Japan. The programme also included the short film Ami's First Love and an animated Azuki-chan short.

== See also ==
- Pied Piper of Hamelin
- Dream world (plot device)
