= Robbie Daymond =

American voice actor

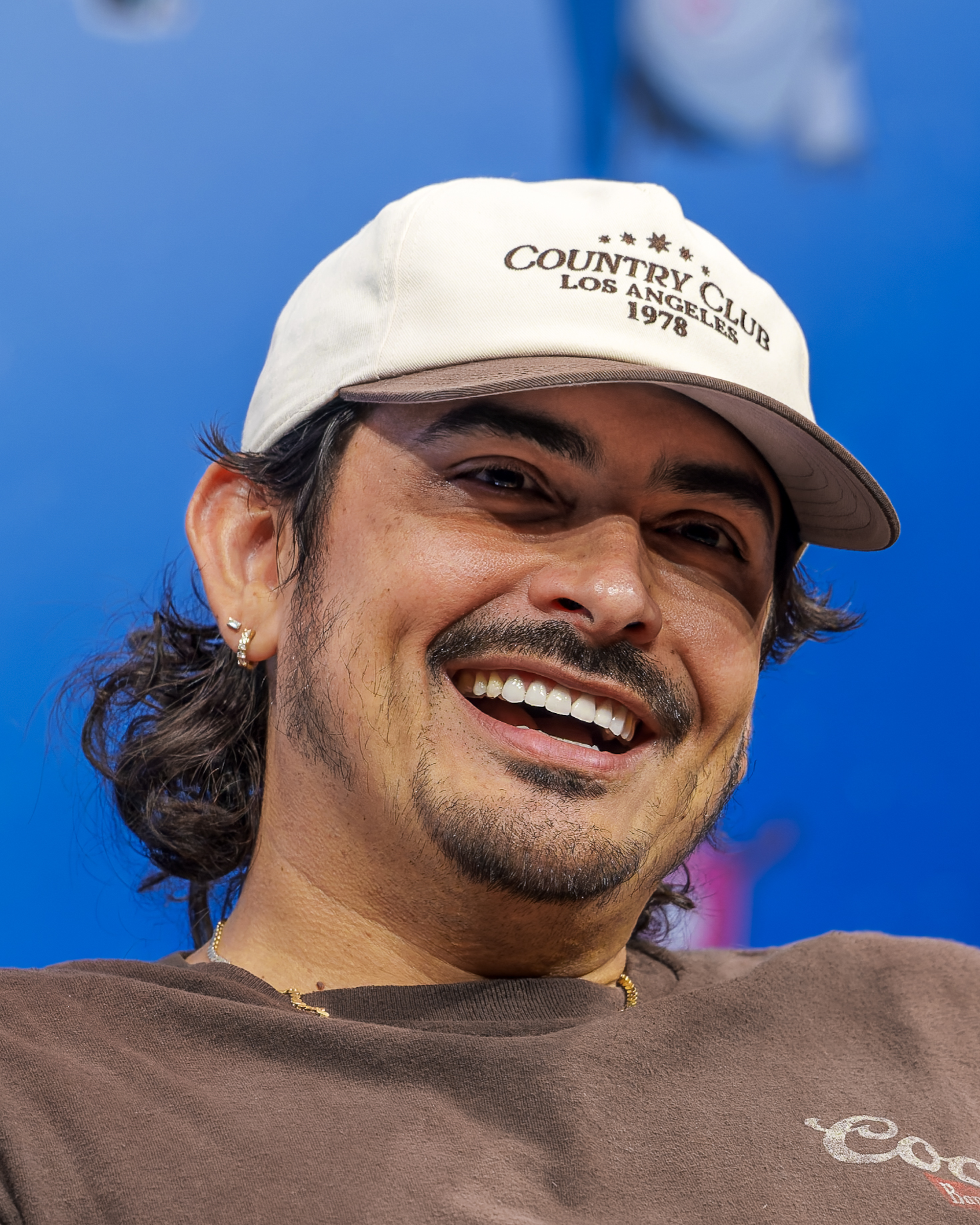
- Daymond in 2026
- Born: March 11, 1982 (age 44); Chesterfield, Missouri, U.S.
- Education: Webster University; University of Nevada, Las Vegas (BFA, MFA)
- Occupation: Voice actor
- Years active: 2007–present
- Spouse: Megan Strand (m. 2019)
- Children: 2
- Website: robbiedaymond.com

Robert Daymond Howard (born March 11, 1982) is an American voice actor who is mostly known for his roles in video games, animation, anime and audiobooks. Some of his best known roles include Tuxedo Mask in the Viz Media redub of Sailor Moon, Spider-Man in Marvel's Spider-Man and various Marvel media, Mike, Orbulon and Young Cricket in WarioWare Gold, Megumi Fushiguro in Jujutsu Kaisen, Jesse Cosay in the second season of Infinity Train, Goro Akechi in Persona 5, Hubert von Vestra in Fire Emblem: Three Houses and Fire Emblem Warriors: Three Hopes, Lloyd Bannings in Trails series, Prompto Argentum in Final Fantasy XV, Toneri Ōtsutsuki in The Last: Naruto the Movie, Alan Sylvasta in BNA: Brand New Animal, Flect Turn in My Hero Academia: World Heroes' Mission, River Ward in Cyberpunk 2077, and on-camera as Dorian Storm in the Dungeons & Dragons actual play web series Critical Role and its spinoff Exandria Unlimited.

== Early life ==
Robbie Daymond was born in Chesterfield, Missouri on March 11, 1982, the son of Laura Marks. His mother is of German descent, and his biological father is of indigenous Apache descent. His biological father left the family when Daymond was an infant, leaving his mother to raise him with the help of her parents in Warrenton, Missouri. He took an interest in acting when he was 10 after participating in the play On Golden Pond.

After Daymond's mother remarried, he was adopted by his step-father Gregory Allen Howard in 1995 and changed his last name to Howard. His family then moved to St. Charles, Missouri. In 2000, he attended Webster University, but later transferred to the University of Nevada, Las Vegas, where he graduated with a BFA in Theatre Performance in 2004. He taught and performed at the Nevada Conservatory Theatre, which was related to UNLV, and received his MFA at UNLV in 2007.

== Career ==
In 2007, Daymond moved to Los Angeles, where he worked as a college instructor at the New York Film Academy and Quixote Studio. He did some acting in film, television and commercials, but started doing more voice-over work in 2009; by 2011, he was working full-time in voice acting for cartoons, anime, and video games.

Daymond has voiced the lead character in various cartoons: SwaySway in the Nickelodeon program Breadwinners, Blake Myers in the Nick cartoon Get Blake!, and the title character in Marvel's Spider-Man, which first aired on Disney XD in 2017.

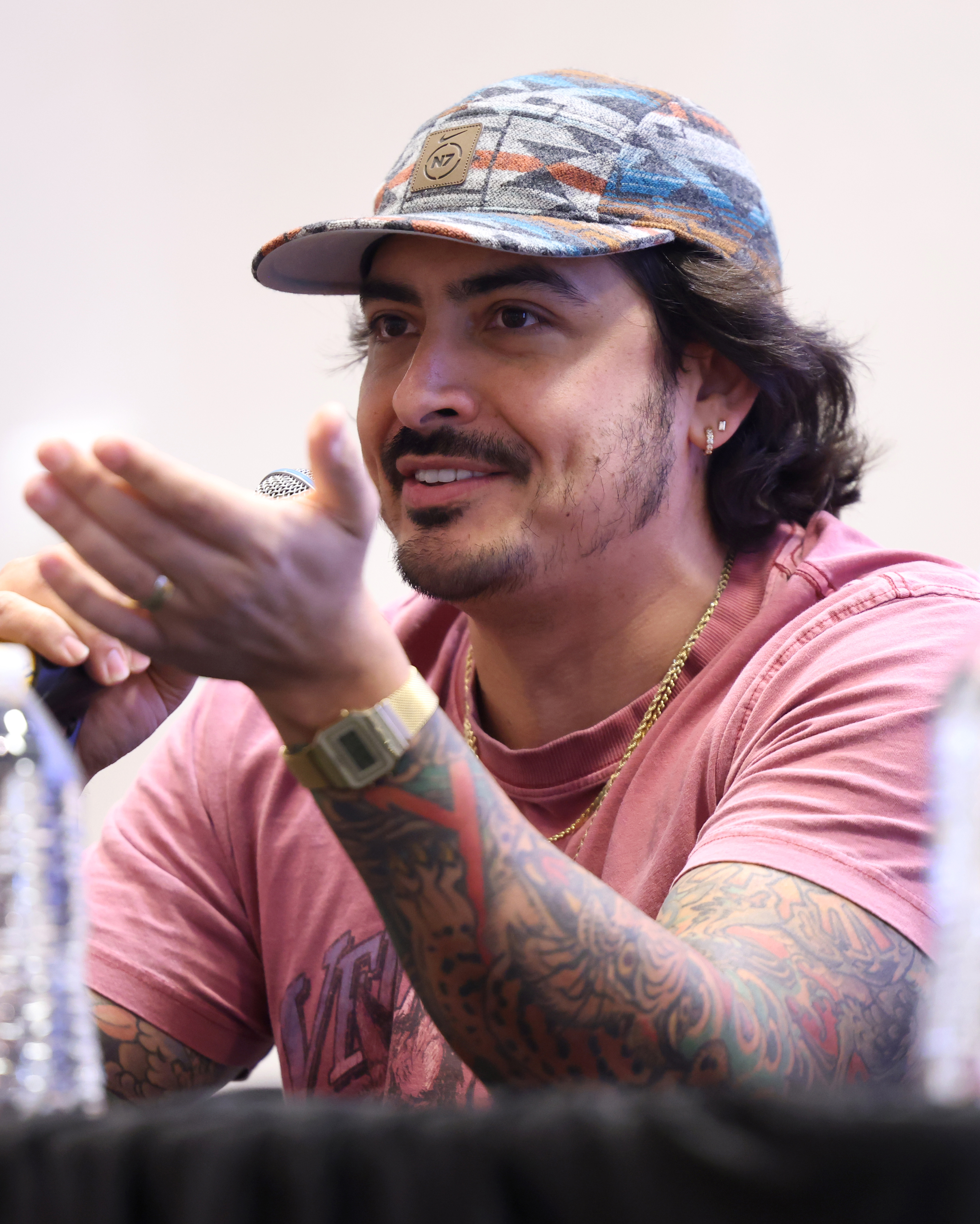
Daymond speaking at an anime convention in March 2025

In anime and video games, Daymond's roles have included: Tuxedo Mask in the Viz Media dub of Sailor Moon, Rintaro Tsumugi in The Fragrant Flower Blooms with Dignity, Megumi Fushiguro in Jujutsu Kaisen, Mumen Rider in One-Punch Man, Hubert von Vestra in Fire Emblem: Three Houses, Mike, Orbulon, and Cricket in WarioWare Gold, Sorey in Tales of Zestiria, Goro Akechi in Persona 5, Lloyd Bannings in The Legend of Heroes: Trails of Cold Steel II and IV, Joe Kido in Digimon Adventure tri. and Prompto Argentum in Final Fantasy XV, Fret in Halo Infinite, Smokey Brown in JoJo's Bizarre Adventure, Chrollo Lucilfer in Hunter x Hunter, Kayn in League of Legends as well as The Seven Deadly Sins, Chai in Hi-Fi Rush, Stardust Cookie in Cookie Run: Kingdom, Adam Bindewald in Godzilla: Planet of the Monsters, Godzilla: City on the Edge of Battle, and Godzilla: The Planet Eater.

From June to August 2021, Daymond starred in Exandria Unlimited, an actual play spinoff limited series of the web series Critical Role. He played Dorian Storm, an air genasi bard. He continued to play Dorian in Critical Role's third campaign as a guest star for the first fourteen episodes. In March 2022, he reprised the role in the two part special Exandria Unlimited: Kymal. He then reprised the role again in Critical Role's third campaign for another block of episodes in 2024. Polygon opined that Dorian had a "beautiful storyline" with Daymond's "stand out" performance which "was so integral to the start of Campaign 3" – "he participated in the cast's goofy asides and reactions, but also left room for moments of gravitas and emotional exploration. Part of what makes his performance as Dorian such a joy to watch is the knowledge that he is new to the table, and fairly new to the hobby". In 2023, he starred in the actual play Candela Obscura: The Circle of the Vassal & the Veil as Professor Howard Margrove; this horror anthology series was produced by Critical Role Productions. Daymond is also one of the narrators for the audiobook edition of the novel Critical Role: Vox Machina – Kith & Kin (2021). In 2025, Daymond joined Critical Role's main cast for the upcoming fourth campaign, which premiered in October 2025, playing as Kattigan "Kat" Vale, a human ranger.

Daymond and fellow voice actors Ray Chase and Max Mittelman formed video game company Sassy Chap Games to develop the 2025 dating sim Date Everything!

== Personal life ==
Daymond met Megan Lynn Strand in 2004 while they were studying at the University of Nevada, Las Vegas. They reside in Los Angeles, where they spent eight years in an on-and-off relationship before becoming engaged in 2017. They were married on April 7, 2019. They have two children.

== Filmography ==
=== Anime ===
List of English dubbing performances in animation
Year	Title	Role	Notes	Source
2014–15	Marvel Disk Wars: The Avengers	Peter Parker / Spider-Man		
2014–19	Sailor Moon	Mamoru Chiba / Tuxedo Mask	Viz dub Debut role	
2015	Sword Art Online II	Dr. Kurahashi		Facebook
2015	Charlotte	Shunsuke Otosaka		
2015	Fate/stay night: Unlimited Blade Works	Issei Ryudo, Atrum		
2015	JoJo's Bizarre Adventure	Smokey Brown	Eps. 10–26	
2015	Glitter Force	Calvin, Hugo, Chloe's Older Brother		
2015–16	Mobile Suit Gundam: The Origin	Lino Fernandez	Ep. 3	
2015–16	Naruto: Shippuden	Musai, Yukai		
2015–16	Durarara!!×2	Ran Izumii		
2015–17	Sailor Moon Crystal	Mamoru Chiba / Tuxedo Mask		
2015–21	The Seven Deadly Sins	Gilthunder		
2016	Aldnoah.Zero	Mazuurek	Season 2	
2016	Your Lie in April	Saito		
2016	Mobile Suit Gundam: Iron-Blooded Orphans	Gaelio Bauduin		
2016–17	Tales of Zestiria the X	Sorey		
2016–17	God Eater	Lenka Utsugi		
2016–present	One-Punch Man	Mumen Rider, Subterranean, Young Man		
2017	Hunter × Hunter	Chrollo Lucilfer	2011 series	
2017	March Comes In like a Lion	Tatsuyuki Misumi		
2017–18	Marvel Future Avengers	Peter Parker / Spider-Man		
2017	Skip Beat!	Ren Tsuruga		
2018	Kabaneri of the Iron Fortress	Ikoma		
2018	Katsugeki/Touken Ranbu	Izuminokami Kanesada		
2018	Skip Beat!	Ren Tsuruga		
2018	Rokka: Braves of the Six Flowers	Adlet Mayer		
2018	FLCL Progressive	Ko Ide		
2018	Last Hope	Leon Lau		
2018–20	Baki	Katahira, Kiyosumi, Shiba	Netflix ONA	
2018–present	Re:Zero − Starting Life in Another World	Reinhard van Astrea		
2018–24	Boruto: Naruto Next Generations	Mitsuki, Log, Toneri Otsutsuki		
2018–21	Megalobox	Mikio		
2019–21	Isekai Quartet	Reinhard van Astrea		
2019–21	Attack on Titan	Grice	2 episodes	
2019	Cells at Work!	Killer T Cell		
2019	Bungo Stray Dogs	Ace	Episode: "My Ill Deeds Are the Work of God"	
2019–20	Fate/Grand Order - Absolute Demonic Front: Babylonia	Merlin		
2019–23	ULTRAMAN	Jack / Ultraman Jack		
2019–24	Demon Slayer: Kimetsu no Yaiba	Hotaru Haganezuka		
2020–present	KonoSuba	Vanir		
2020	Ghost in the Shell: SAC_2045	Sanji Yaguchi, Shinya Uotori		
2020	BNA: Brand New Animal	Alan Sylvasta		
2020	Persona 5: The Animation	Goro Akechi		
2020	The God of High School	Mo-Ri Jin		
2020–22	Yashahime: Princess Half-Demon	Sōta Higurashi		
2020–present	Jujutsu Kaisen	Megumi Fushiguro		
2021	Sleepy Princess in the Demon Castle	Hypnos		
2021	Kuroko's Basketball	Atsushi Murasakibara		
2021	The Prince of Tennis II: Hyotei vs. Rikkai Game of Future	Seiichi Yukimura		
2021	My Hero Academia	Flect Turn	Episode: "Long Time No See, Selkie"	
2021	Battle Game in 5 Seconds	Akira Shiroyanagi		
2021	Vinland Saga	Asser	Netflix dub	
2021	Re-Main	Minato Kiyomizu		
2022	The Prince of Tennis	Seiichi Yukimura		
2022	Tiger & Bunny	Subaru Sengoku (Mr Black), Gregory Sunshine		
2022	Fate/Grand Carnival	Mysterious Cat Z, Merlin		
2022	Exception	Mack		
2022–2026	Bleach: Thousand-Year Blood War	Jugram Haschwalth, Royd Loyd, Nianzol Weizol		
2023	One Piece	Kozuki Oden	Crunchyroll dub	
2023	Onimusha	Iemon		
2024	Monsters: 103 Mercies Dragon Damnation	Shimotsuki Ryuma		
2024–25	Ishura	Kuze, Heng, Riforgid		
2024–25	The Seven Deadly Sins: Four Knights of the Apocalypse	Gilthunder		
2024	Uzumaki	Shuichi Saito		
2024	Sound! Euphonium	Noburu Taki		
2025	The Fragrant Flower Blooms with Dignity	Rintaro Tsumugi		
2026	Rooster Fighter	Keisuke		

=== Television ===
Key
†	Denotes television productions that have not yet been released

List of voice performances in animation
Year	Title	Role	Notes	Source
2012–16	Transformers: Rescue Bots	Evan, Myles, Bot Dog Vendor, Speeder Don, Foreman	7 episodes	
2013–16	Ever After High	Alistair Wonderland		
2014–16	Breadwinners	SwaySway, various voices		
2016	Star Wars Rebels	The Eighth Brother	Episode: "Twilight of the Apprentice"	
2016–18	Avengers Assemble	Bucky Barnes, Peter Parker / Spider-Man, Goon #2	2 episodes	
2017	The Tom and Jerry Show	Ramone, Sifu, Batboy		
2017–19	OK K.O.! Let's Be Heroes	Raymond, Co-Bruh, Rex Th' Bunny, additional voices		
2017–20	Spider-Man	Peter Parker / Spider-Man, Superior Spider-Man, various voices		
2018	Guardians of the Galaxy	Peter Parker / Spider-Man	2 episodes	
2018	The Adventures of Kid Danger	Derf	Episode: "Tiny Toddler"	
2019	Pinky Malinky	Perry, Channing, various voices		
2019	LEGO Marvel Spider-Man: Vexed by Venom	Peter Parker / Spider-Man, Doctor Octopus, Security Captain	Television short	
2019	Carmen Sandiego	Trey Sterling, Security Guard	2 episodes	
2019	The Rocketeer	Officer Crowfoot	8 episodes	
2019–22	Young Justice	Wyynde, Garn Daanuth, Blubber	5 episodes	
2020	Infinity Train	Jesse Cosay, additional voices	8 episodes	
2020	Chico Bon Bon: Monkey with a Tool Belt	Chico Bon Bon		
2020–21	Scooby-Doo and Guess Who?	Gargoyle, Cache Blanc, Chad, Hotel Owner	3 episodes	
2021	Rugrats	Bug	Episode: "Second Time Around"	
2021	Aquaman: King of Atlantis	Finhead	Episode: "Dead Sea"	
2021	The Casagrandes	Charles Little Bull	2 episodes	
2022	Bee and PuppyCat	Cooking Prince	1 episode	
2022	Spirit Rangers	Mouse, Bat	Episode: "The Lacrosse Boss"	
2023	Hailey's On It!	Frederix	2 episodes	
2023	The Legend of Vox Machina	Cerkonos	3 episodes	
2023	RWBY	Curious Cat	7 episodes (volume 9)	
2023	Unicorn: Warriors Eternal	Mick, Orphan Boys	Episode: "The Awakening"	
2023	Mech Cadets	Adam Williams, Loudspeaker, Operator	7 episodes	
2023	Adventure Time: Fionna and Cake	Ice Prince, TV Announcer, Bar Guy	2 episodes	
2024	The Loud House	Boy 1, Male Employee, Boy 2	Episode: "Beg, Borrow and Steele"	
2024	The Fairly OddParents: A New Wish	Kennueth	Episode: "Prime Meridian Love"	
2024	Creature Commandos	Little Sure Shot	Episode: "Cheers to the Tin Man"	
2025	The Mighty Nein	Sabian	Episode: "Who Will You Be?"	
2025–present	Devil May Cry	Vergil		
2026	Avatar: Seven Havens	Kallik	Episode: "The Faceless"	

=== Films ===
List of voice and English dubbing performances in films
Year	Title	Role	Notes	Source
2014	Patema Inverted	Porta	English dub	
2015	Strange Magic	Fairy Cronies		
2015	The Last: Naruto the Movie	Toneri Otsutsuki	English dub	
2016	Quackerz	Longway		
2016	Barbie: Star Light Adventure	Leo		
2016	Digimon Adventure tri.	Joe Kido	English dub, six films	
2016	Kingsglaive: Final Fantasy XV	Prompto Argentum	English dub	
2017	Sailor Moon R: The Movie	Tuxedo Mask	Viz English dub; Theatrical release	
2017	K: Missing Kings	Nagare Hisui	English dub	
2017	Boruto: Naruto the Movie	Mitsuki	English dub	
2017	A Silent Voice	Shoya Ishida	English dub	
2018	Godzilla: Planet of the Monsters	Adam Bindewald	English dub	
2018	Haikara-san: Here Comes Miss Modern	Shinobu Ijuin	English dub	
2018	Godzilla: City on the Edge of Battle	Adam Bindewald	English dub	
2018	Sailor Moon SuperS: The Movie	Oranja	Viz English dub; Theatrical release	
2019	Godzilla: The Planet Eater	Adam Bindewald	English dub	
2019	I Want to Eat Your Pancreas	Haruki Shiga (Me)	English dub; limited theatrical release	
2019	Sound! Euphonium: The Movie – Our Promise: A Brand New Day	Noburo Taki	English dub; limited theatrical release	
2020	NiNoKuni	Gnauss Wisdenn	English dub	
2020	Digimon Adventure: Last Evolution Kizuna	Joe Kido, Armadillomon, Ankylomon, Upamon	English dub	
2021	Sailor Moon Eternal	Mamoru Chiba / Tuxedo Mask	English dub	
2021	The Seven Deadly Sins: Cursed by Light	Gilthunder	English dub	
2021	My Hero Academia: World Heroes' Mission	Flect Turn	English dub	
2021	Sherlock Holmes and the Great Escape	Sherlock Holmes	English dub	
2022	Bubble	Kai	English dub	
2023	Legion of Super-Heroes	Timber Wolf, Brainiac 4		
2023	Legend of Raoh: Chapter of Death in Love	Kenshiro	English dub	
2023	Legend of Raoh: Chapter of Fierce Fight	Kenshiro	English dub	
2023	Digimon Adventure 02: The Beginning	Armadillomon	English dub; limited theatrical release	
2023	Shit Show	Tampy / Condom	Short film	
2024	Maboroshi	Akimune Kikuiri	English dub	

=== Video games ===
List of voice and English dubbing performances in video games
Year	Title	Role	Notes	Source
2014	Fairy Fencer F	Bernard	English dub	
2015	Final Fantasy Type-0 HD	Kurasame Susaya	English dub	
2015	Lord of Magna: Maiden Heaven	Luchs Eduard	English dub	
2015	Stella Glow	Alto	English dub	
2015	Tales of Zestiria	Sorey	English dub	
2015	Xenoblade Chronicles X	Avatar (Studious)	English dub	
2015	Lego Dimensions	Robin (The Lego Batman Movie)		
2016	Lego Marvel Avengers	Rick Jones / A-Bomb		
2016	Teenage Mutant Ninja Turtles: Mutants in Manhattan	Michelangelo		
2016	The Legend of Heroes: Trails of Cold Steel II	Lloyd Bannings	English dub	
2016	Final Fantasy XV	Prompto Argentum, Ixal	English dub	
2017	Fire Emblem Heroes	Tobin, Ares, Hubert	English dub	
2017	Persona 5	Goro Akechi	English dub	
2017	Nier: Automata	Additional voices	English dub	
2017	Akiba's Beat	Yamato Hongo	English dub	
2017	Fire Emblem Echoes: Shadows of Valentia	Tobin	English dub	
2017	League of Legends	Kayn		
2017	Friday the 13th: The Game	Adam Palomino, Kenny Riedell		
2017	Agents of Mayhem	August Gaunt		
2017	Marvel vs. Capcom: Infinite	Peter Parker / Spider-Man		
2017	Horizon Zero Dawn: The Frozen Wilds	Naltuk		
2018	OK K.O.! Let's Play Heroes	Raymond		
2018	WarioWare Gold	Mike, Orbulon, Young Cricket	English dub	
2018	Marvel Powers United VR	Peter Parker / Spider-Man		
2018	The Walking Dead: The Final Season	Mitch		
2018	Fist of the North Star: Lost Paradise	Kenshiro	English dub	
2018	Spyro Reignited Trilogy	Hunter the Cheetah, Marco		
2018	Persona 5: Dancing in Starlight	Goro Akechi	English dub	
2018	Just Cause 4	Oscar Espinosa		
2019	Crash Team Racing Nitro-Fueled	Pinstripe Potoroo, Small Norm		
2019	Marvel Ultimate Alliance 3: The Black Order	Thane, Nova		
2019	Fire Emblem: Three Houses	Hubert von Vestra	English dub	
2019	Catherine: Full Body	Roderick Lockhart	English dub	
2019	Daemon X Machina	Grief	English dub	
2019	Code Vein	Yakumo Shinonome	English dub	
2019	Judgment	Kengo	English dub	
2019	Marvel Dimension of Heroes	Bucky Barnes / Winter Soldier		
2019	Death Stranding	The Film Director		
2019	Grand Chase: Dimensional Chaser	Asin	English dub	
2019	The Elder Scrolls Online	Fennorian, Dirge Truptor, Safik, Korabi		
2020	One-Punch Man: A Hero Nobody Knows	Mumen Rider	English dub	
2020	Persona 5 Royal	Goro Akechi	English dub	
2020	Ghost of Tsushima	Bettomaru, Black Dye Merchant, Shinzo		
2020	The Legend of Heroes: Trails of Cold Steel IV	Lloyd Bannings	English dub	
2020	Bugsnax	Buffalocust		
2020	Yakuza: Like a Dragon	Tianyou Zhao	English dub	
2020	Marvel's Spider-Man: Miles Morales	The Underground		
2020	Cyberpunk 2077	River Ward		
2021	Re:Zero − Starting Life in Another World: The Prophecy of the Throne	Reinhard Van Astrea		
2021	Nier Replicant ver.1.22474487139...	P-33, additional voices		
2021	Crash Bandicoot: On the Run!	Pinstripe Potoroo		
2021	Shin Megami Tensei III: Nocturne HD Remaster	Isamu Nitta, Noah	English dub	
2021	Guilty Gear Strive	Happy Chaos	English dub	
2021	Demon Slayer: Kimetsu no Yaiba – The Hinokami Chronicles	Hotaru Haganezuka	English dub	
2021	Halo Infinite	Fret		
2021	Lost Judgment	Additional voices	English dub	
2022	Horizon Forbidden West	Bree		
2022	Rune Factory 5	Ares	English dub	
2022	Fire Emblem Warriors: Three Hopes	Hubert von Vestra	English dub	
2023	Hi-Fi Rush	Chai	English dub	
2023	Granblue Fantasy: Relink	Id	English dub	
2023	Cookie Run: Kingdom	Stardust Cookie	English dub	
2023	Omega Strikers	Kai	English dub	
2023	Diablo IV	Creatures		
2023	The Legend of Heroes: Trails into Reverie	Lloyd Bannings	English dub	
2023	Armored Core VI: Fires of Rubicon	G6 Red, additional voices	English dub	
2023	Naruto x Boruto: Ultimate Ninja Storm Connections	Indra Otsutsuki, Toneri Otsutsuki, Mitsuki	English dub	
2023	Persona 5 Tactica	Goro Akechi	English dub	
2023	Granblue Fantasy Versus: Rising	Jumpy Man, Id	English dub	
2024	Like a Dragon: Infinite Wealth	Tianyou Zhao	English dub	
2024	Granblue Fantasy: Relink	Id	English dub	
2024	Jujutsu Kaisen: Cursed Clash	Megumi Fushiguro	English dub	
2024	Helldivers 2	Helldiver Voice 4		
2025	Xenoblade Chronicles X: Definitive Edition	Avatar (Studious), additional voices	English dub	
2025	Doom: The Dark Ages	Slayer Suit, Maykr Tech Manager		
2025	Date Everything!	The Hanks, Johnny Splash, Nekoboru		
2025	Assassin's Creed Shadows	Rufino	Daymond originally portrayed the character in a Critical Role one-shot.	
2025	Death Stranding 2: On the Beach	The Bokka		
2025	Demon Slayer: Kimetsu no Yaiba – The Hinokami Chronicles 2	Hotaru Haganezuka	English dub	
2025	Ghost of Yōtei	Additional voices		
2025	Ys vs. Trails in the Sky: Alternative Saga	Lloyd Bannings	English dub	
2025	Double Dragon Revive	Jimmy Lee	English dub	
2025	The Outer Worlds 2	Additional voices		
2025	Dune Awakening	Theo Skordi, Marwan Coel, Maas Kharet Recruiter, Campos Demari		
2026	Highguard	Slade		

=== Audio books ===
Year	Title	Role	Notes	Source
2021	Critical Role: Vox Machina – Kith & Kin	Narrator		
2022	Critical Role: The Mighty Nein – The Nine Eyes of Lucien	Narrator		
2022	Aces Wild: A Heist	Narrator		
2024	Critical Role: Bells Hells – What Doesn't Break	Narrator		
2026	Critical Role: The Mighty Nein – Untold Stories	Narrator		
2026	Critical Role: The Mighty Nein – Children of Empire	Narrator		

=== Web ===
Year	Title	Role	Notes	Source
2021	Exandria Unlimited	Dorian Storm	Main role; 8 episodes	
2021–2022, 2024–2025	Critical Role (campaign 3)	Dorian Storm, Cerkonos	Guest role; 40 episodes	
2022	Exandria Unlimited: Kymal	Dorian Storm	Main role; 2 episodes	
2022–2025	Critical Role (one-shots)	Mateo Sandoval	Episode: "Tiny Tina's Wonderlands One-Shot"	
2022–2025	Critical Role (one-shots)	Dink	Episode: "Lookout, Here We Come!"	
2022–2025	Critical Role (one-shots)	Rufino	Episode: "Assassin's Creed Shadows One-Shot"	
2022–2025	Critical Role (one-shots)	Malvolio Contreras	Episode: "Total Party Kill: Chicago Live 2025"	
2023	Candela Obscura	Howard Margrove	3 episodes	
2025	Dirty Laundry	Himself	Episode: "Who Joined an Ex on Their Honeymoon?"; Social deduction game show presented by Dropout	
2025	Talon	Zekyr	Pilot	
2025–present	Critical Role (campaign 4)	Kattigan Vale	Main role	
2027	Reign of the Weredragon †	TBA	Main role	

Preceded by Vincent Corazza	Voice of Tuxedo Mask; 2014–2019	Succeeded by None

Preceded by Drake Bell	Voice of Spider-Man; 2017–2020	Succeeded by Benjamin Valic
