= Toby Proctor =

Canadian actor

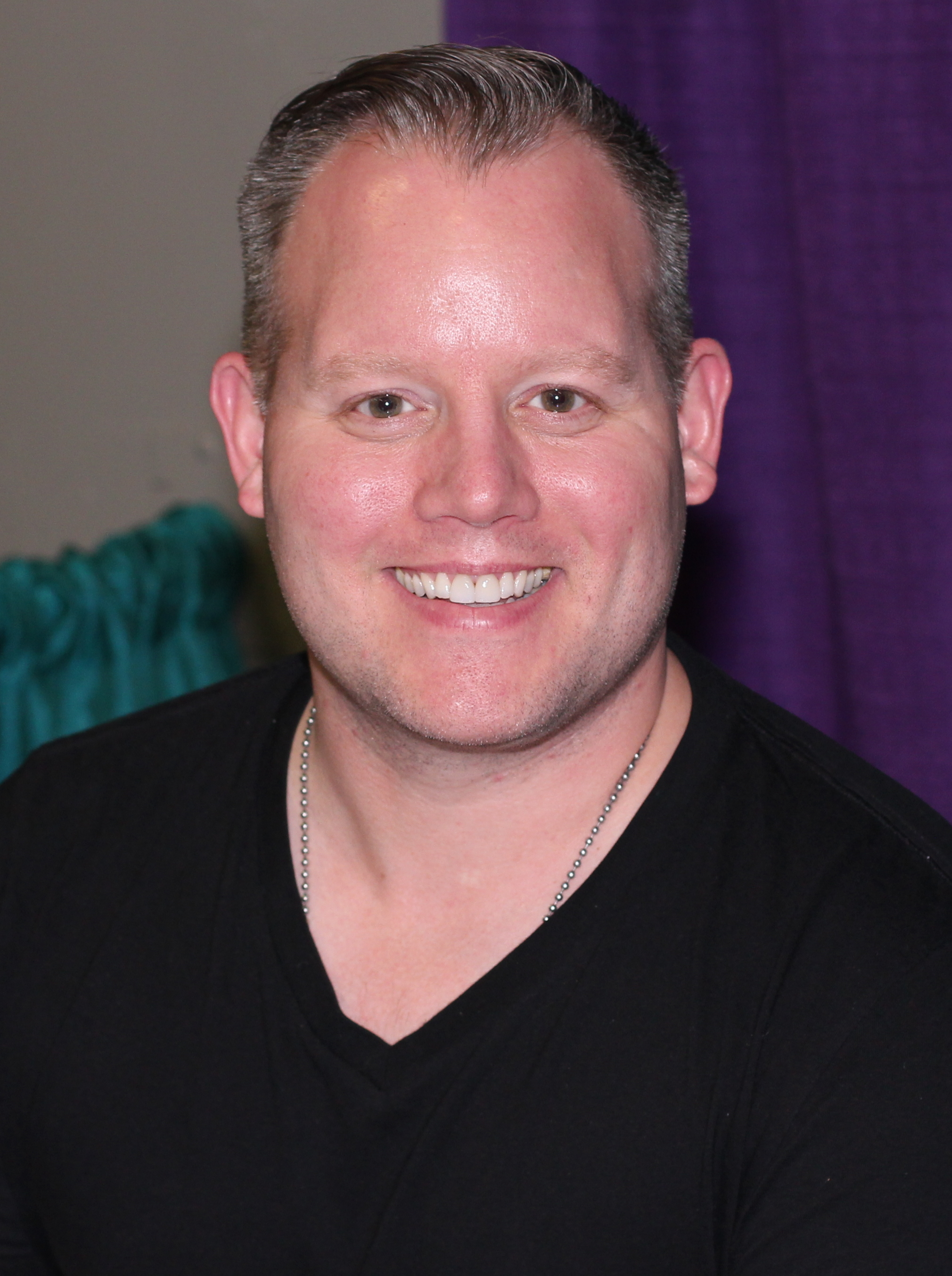
- Proctor at Animate Miami in 2014
- Occupation: Actor
- Years active: 1988–present
- Known for: Tuxedo Mask in Sailor Moon

Toby Proctor is a Canadian voice, film and television actor. He voiced Darien/Tuxedo Mask in the English dub of the Sailor Moon anime in 54 episodes of the first two series. His other roles include Alex Flash Gordon in Flash Gordon and Copycat Ken in Ranma ½.

== Filmography ==
=== Films ===
- To Catch a Killer (1992) – Michael Kozenczak
- Gregory K. (1993) – Russ Child #4
- The Man in the Attic (1995) – Carl
- Shadow Builder (1998) -– Harvey Price
- White Lies (1998) – Chip
- Dash and Lily (1999) – Flower Delivery Boy
- In Too Deep (1999) – Red-Haired Cadet
- Daydream Believers: The Monkee's Story (2000) – Auditioner #3
- Feast of All Saints (2001) – Henri DeLande
- Jewel (2001) – Gene
- Danger Beneath the Sea (2001) – Seaman
- Do or Die (2003) – Citizone Cop
- Jasper, Texas (2003) – Sean Berry
- Highwaymen (2004) – Rookie
- The Skulls III (2004) – Sam Brooks
- Childstar (2004) - Wade Keller – 1st A.D.
- The Man (2005) – Cavity Search Guard
- Dawgs Playing Poker (2008) – Bouncer
- Yeah Rite (2012) – Father Lewis
- Daisy: A Hen Into the Wild (2014) – Willie
- Merry Matrimony (2015) – Phil

=== Television ===
- T. and T. (1988) – Nick
- By Way of the Stars (1992) – Franz
- Beyond Reality (1993) – Bobby
- Ranma ½ – Ken 'Copycat Ken'
- The Mighty Jungle – Wayne
- The Busy World of Richard Scarry (1994–1997) – Additional Voices
- Ultraforce (1994–1995)
- Sailor Moon (1995) – Tuxedo Mask (Episodes 12–65)
- Road to Avonlea (1996) – Morgan Pettibone
- Flash Gordon (1996) – Alex Flash Gordon
- Police Academy: The Series (1997–1998) – Dirk Tackleberry
- Mythic Warriors: Guardians and the Legend (1998–1999) – Telemachus, Soldier #2
- Animorphs (1999) – Scottie
- Blue Murder (2001) – Roommate
- Earth: Final Conflict (2001) – Blake
- Power Stone (2002)
- Wild Card (2003) – Video Guy
- Show Me Yours (2004) – Joe
- The Bridge (2010) – Ross
- Turbo Dogs (2010–2011)
- XIII: The Series (2011) – Police Officer #2
- Nikita (2013) – FBI Medic
- Lost Girl (2013) – Pike
- Alien Mysteries (2013) – Sergeant Pennison
- Reign (2014) – Farmer
- Heroes Reborn (2015) – Norris

=== Video games ===
- Mega Man Legends 2 (2000) – Glyde

Preceded by Rino Romano	Voice of Tuxedo Mask; Eps. 12 - 65	Succeeded by Vincent Corazza
