= Studiopolis =

American post-production studio

- Type: Private
- Industry: Voice recording, TV production, Dubbing
- Founder: Denny Densmore
- Headquarters: 11700 Ventura Blvd, Studio City, Los Angeles, California; 4028 Colfax Ave, Studio City, Los Angeles, California
- Key people: Jamie Simone (owner, producer, casting director and voice director)
- Divisions: Studiopolis Burbank
- Website: Official site

Studiopolis, Inc. is an American post-production studio located in Studio City, Los Angeles. It specializes in voiceover recording and dubbing for cartoon, anime, and video game projects. They were formerly known as Screenmusic Studios and then Studio E Productions until 2005. The studio is owned by Jamie Simone. It has another studio located in Burbank, California.

== Filmography ==
=== Animation ===
This shows a list of animated programs that this studio recorded for.

- Æon Flux (Los Angeles)
- The Avengers: Earth's Mightiest Heroes (Los Angeles)
- Avengers Assemble (Burbank)
- Ben 10 (2016 Reboot) (Burbank)
- Biker Mice from Mars
- Buzz Lightyear of Star Command
- Carmen Sandiego (Los Angeles)
- Celebrity Deathmatch (2006) (Los Angeles)
- Clash-A-Rama
- Clifford's Puppy Days (Los Angeles)
- Curious George
- Danger Rangers (Los Angeles)
- Doc McStuffins (Burbank)
- Dorothy and the Wizard of Oz (Los Angeles)
- Edgar & Ellen (The Ocean Group)
- The Emperor's New School
- Eureka!
- Family Guy
- Gormiti (Los Angeles)
- Hazbin Hotel
- Henry Hugglemonster (Los Angeles)
- Hoodwinked!
- Hulk and the Agents of S.M.A.S.H. (Los Angeles)
- If You Give a Mouse a Cookie
- Invincible
- James Bond Jr.
- Kaijudo: Rise of the Duel Masters (Los Angeles)
- Kiba Oh Klashers (Los Angeles)
- The Land Before Time (Los Angeles)
- Looney Tunes Cartoons
- Mecard (Los Angeles)
- Miles from Tomorrowland (Los Angeles)
- My Little Pony: A New Generation
- NFL Rush Zone: Guardians of the Core (Los Angeles)
- Ni Hao, Kai-Lan (Los Angeles)
- Pinkfong Wonderstar (Los Angeles)
- Pound Puppies (Los Angeles)
- Rainbow Brite (2014) (Los Angeles)
- Randy Cunningham: 9th Grade Ninja (Los Angeles)
- Rick & Steve (Los Angeles)
- Skylanders Academy (Los Angeles)
- Sonic Boom (Los Angeles)
- The Spectacular Spider-Man (Burbank)
- Spirit Rangers
- Stripperella (Los Angeles)
- The Super Hero Squad Show (Los Angeles)
- Teenage Mutant Ninja Turtles (1987) (Seasons 5–8, 10) (Los Angeles)
- The Mask: Animated Series
- The Tick (Los Angeles)
- Todd McFarlane's Spawn (Los Angeles)
- Transformers TV shows (Los Angeles)
  - Prime
  - Rescue Bots
  - Robots in Disguise
  - Combiner Wars
- T.O.T.S. (Burbank)
- Ultimate Spider-Man (Burbank)
- Vampirina (Los Angeles)
- W.I.T.C.H. (Los Angeles)
- Wolverine and the X-Men (Los Angeles)
- Young Justice (Los Angeles)

=== Anime ===
This shows a list of Anime that this studio recorded English dubs for:

- 3×3 Eyes (Streamline Pictures)
- 8 Man After (Streamline Pictures)
- The 8th Son? Are You Kidding Me? (Crunchyroll)
- Afro Samurai (Crunchyroll)
- Babel II OVA (Streamline Pictures)
- Baki (Netflix)
  - Baki Hanma (Netflix)
- Barefoot Gen (Streamline Pictures)
- Bio Hunter (Urban Vision Entertainment)
- Bleach (Viz Media)
- Bleach: Thousand-Year Blood War (Viz Media)
- Blood+ (Sony Pictures Home Entertainment)
- Blue Dragon (Viz Media)
- Boruto: Naruto Next Generations (Viz Media)
- Bungo Stray Dogs (Crunchyroll)
- Crimson Wolf (Streamline Pictures)
- Crying Freeman (Streamline Pictures)
- Daigunder (Disney Enterprises)
- Didn't I Say to Make My Abilities Average in the Next Life?! (Crunchyroll)
- Digimon TV shows (BVS Entertainment)
  - Data Squad (Disney)
  - Fusion (Saban Brands)
- Dino Girl Gauko (Netflix)
- Dinozaurs (Saban Entertainment)
- Dirty Pair: Affair on Nolandia (Streamline Pictures)
- Dirty Pair: Flight 005 Conspiracy (Streamline Pictures)
- Doomed Megalopolis (Streamline Pictures)
- Duel Masters (ShoPro/Hasbro Entertainment)
- Eyeshield 21 (Viz Media)
- The Faraway Paladin (Crunchyroll)
- Glitter Force (Saban Brands/Netflix)
- Glitter Force Doki Doki (Netflix)
- The God of High School (Crunchyroll/Viz Media)
- Golgo 13: The Professional (Streamline Pictures)
- Golgo 13: Queen Bee (Urban Vision)
- Good Night World (NAZ/Netflix)
- Great Teacher Onizuka (Tokyopop)
- The Hidden Dungeon Only I Can Enter (Crunchyroll)
- High School Prodigies Have It Easy Even in Another World (Crunchyroll)
- If It's for My Daughter, I'd Even Defeat a Demon Lord (Crunchyroll)
- I'm Standing on a Million Lives (Crunchyroll)
- I've Been Killing Slimes for 300 Years and Maxed Out My Level (Season 1 only, Crunchyroll)
- In the Land of Leadale (Crunchyroll)
- Infini-T Force (Viz Media)
- Initial D (Tokyopop)
- Isekai Cheat Magician (Crunchyroll)
- Jujutsu Kaisen (Viz Media for Season 1, Crunchyroll for Seasons 2-present)
- K (Viz Media)
- Kabaneri of the Iron Fortress (Crunchyroll)
- Kaze no Yojimbo (Bandai Entertainment)
- Kekkaishi (Viz Media → Discotek Media; co-dubbed with Salami Studios)
- Kyo Kara Maoh! (Season 2: Geneon Entertainment)
- Lensman (Streamline Pictures)
- Lily C.A.T. (Streamline Pictures)
- Love of Kill (Crunchyroll)
- Magical Girl Pretty Sammy (Geneon USA)
- Magical Sempai (Crunchyroll)
- Marmalade Boy (Tokyopop)
- Marvel Anime (Marvel)
- Marvel Disk Wars: The Avengers (Marvel Entertainment)
- Marvel Future Avengers (MADHOUSE/Marvel Entertainment)
- MegaMan Star Force (Viz Media)
- Megazone 23: Part I (Streamline Pictures)
- Mon Colle Knights (Saban Entertainment)
- Monster Girl Doctor (Crunchyroll/Sentai Filmworks)
- Mr. Osomatsu (seasons 1-2 only, Viz Media)
- My Daemon (Igloo Studio/Netflix)
- My Next Life as a Villainess: All Routes Lead to Doom! (Sentai Filmworks for Season 1, Crunchyroll for Season 2)
- The Mystery of Mamo (Streamline Pictures)
- Nadia: The Secret of Blue Water (Streamline Pictures)
- Naruto (Viz Media)
- Naruto Shippuden (Viz Media)
- Noblesse (Crunchyroll)
- Pacific Rim: The Black (Netflix)
- Pet Shop of Horrors (Urban Vision)
- Platinum End (Crunchyroll)
- Rave Master (Tokyopop)
- Reign: The Conqueror (Tokyopop)
- Rent-A-Girlfriend (Sentai Filmworks for Season 1, Crunchyroll for Season 2)
- RoboDz Kazagumo Hen (Disney)
- Rooster Fighter (Viz Media)
- Saber Marionette J Again (Bandai Entertainment)
- Sailor Moon (Toei USA via Viz Media)
- Sailor Moon Crystal (Toei USA via Viz Media)
- Saint Tail (Tokyopop)
- Sakugan (Crunchyroll)
- Science Fell in Love, So I Tried to Prove It (Sentai Filmworks for Season 1, Crunchyroll for Season 2)
- Silent Möbius (Streamline Pictures)
- So I'm a Spider, So What? (Crunchyroll)
- Somali and the Forest Spirit (Crunchyroll/Sentai Filmworks)
- Stitch! (Disney Enterprises)
- The Strongest Sage with the Weakest Crest (Crunchyroll)
- Tenkai Knights (Spin Master Entertainment/ShoPro)
- Terra Formars (Viz Media)
- Tiger & Bunny (Viz Media for Season 1, Netflix for Season 2)
- To the Abandoned Sacred Beasts (Crunchyroll/Anime Limited)
- To Your Eternity (Viz Media for Season 1, Crunchyroll for Seasons 2-present)
- Tokyo Revengers (Season 1 only, Crunchyroll/Viz Media)
- Tower of God (Viz Media for Season 1, Crunchyroll for Season 2)
- Twilight of the Cockroaches (Streamline Pictures)
- Twilight of the Dark Master (Urban Vision)
- Twin Star Exorcists (Crunchyroll)
- Ultraman (Netflix)
- Vampire Princess Miyu (Tokyopop)
- The World's Finest Assassin Gets Reincarnated in Another World as an Aristocrat (Crunchyroll)
- Zatch Bell! (Viz Media)
- Zillion (Streamline Pictures)
- Z-Squad (Nelvana)

=== Live Action ===
This shows a list of live action shows that this studio recorded English dubs for:

- Victim Number 8 (2018) (for Netflix)
- Carlo & Malik (2018) (for Netflix)
- The Gift (2019) (for Netflix)
- The School Nurse Files (2020) (for Netflix)

=== Films ===
==== Animation ====
- Alpha and Omega
- April and the Extraordinary World
- Balto III: Wings of Change
- Casper's Scare School
- Doctor Strange: The Sorcerer Supreme
- Happily N'Ever After
- Hellboy Animated: Iron Shoes
- Kung Fu Magoo
- My Little Pony: The Movie
- Next Avengers: Heroes of Tomorrow
- Planet Hulk
- Sneaks
- Space Chimps 1 and 2: Zartog Strikes Back
- The Chronicles of Riddick: Dark Fury
- The Drawn Together Movie: The Movie!
- The Invincible Iron Man
- Thor: Tales of Asgard
- Tom and Jerry: The Fast and the Furry
- Ultimate Avengers 1 and 2
- Van Helsing: The London Assignment
- You Animal!

==== Anime ====
- Avengers Confidential: Black Widow & Punisher (Sony Pictures Home Entertainment)
- Castle in the Sky (Studio Ghibli)
- The Castle of Cagliostro (Streamline Pictures)
- Digimon Adventure tri. (Eleven Arts/Toei Animation)
- Digimon 02 - Movie: Revenge of Diaboromon (Disney/BVS Entertainment/Jetix/Toei Animation USA)
- Digimon Tamers - Movie: Battle of Adventurers (Disney/BVS Entertainment/Jetix/Toei Animation USA)
- Digimon Tamers - Movie: Runaway Locomon (Disney/BVS Entertainment/Jetix/Toei Animation USA)
- Digimon Frontier - Movie: Island of the Lost Digimon (Disney/BVS Entertainment/Jetix/Toei Animation USA)
- Dirty Pair: Project Eden (Streamline Pictures/ADV Films)
- Drifting Home (Studio Colorido/Netflix)
- Final Fantasy: The Spirits Within (Sony Pictures Entertainment/Square Pictures)
- The Imaginary (Studio Ponoc/Netflix)
- Iron Man: Rise of Technovore (Sony Pictures Home Entertainment)
- Kiki's Delivery Service (Studio Ghibli)
- Modest Heroes (Studio Ponoc)
- Naruto (film series) (Viz Media)
- Neo Tokyo (Streamline Pictures/ADV Films)
- Only Yesterday (Studio Ghibli)
- Sailor Moon R - The Movie: The Promise of the Rose (Toei Animation/Viz Media)
- Sailor Moon S - The Movie: Hearts in Ice (Toei Animation/Viz Media)
- Sailor Moon SuperS - The Movie: Black Dream Hole (Toei Animation/Viz Media)
- Tekkonkinkreet (Sony Pictures Entertainment)
- Tenchi the Movie: Tenchi Muyo! in Love (Geneon USA)
- Tenchi the Movie 2: The Daughter of Darkness (Geneon Entertainment)
- Tenchi Forever! The Movie (Geneon Entertainment USA)
- The Dog of Flanders (Pioneer Entertainment USA)
- The Orbital Children (Production +h/Netflix)
- The Tale of the Princess Kaguya (Studio Ghibli)
- Vampire Hunter D (Streamline Pictures)
- Vampire Hunter D: Bloodlust (Urban Vision Entertainment)
- When Marnie Was There (Studio Ghibli)
- Wicked City (Streamline Pictures)
- Wonderful Days (Endgame Entertainment)
- Zeram (Streamline Pictures)

==== Live-action ====
- Bleach (2018) (for Netflix)
- Cuties (2020) (for Netflix)
- Elisa & Marcela (2019) (for Netflix)
- Zeram (1991) (for Streamline Pictures)

=== Video games ===
This shows a list of video games that this studio recorded for.

- Armored Core 4
- Bleach
- Dead or Alive: Dimensions
- Dead or Alive Paradise
- Dead or Alive Xtreme 2
- Digimon World Data Squad
- Dinosaur King
- Disney Infinity: Marvel Super Heroes
- Final Fantasy games
  - Final Fantasy X
  - Final Fantasy XIII
  - Final Fantasy XIII-2
- Final Fantasy Tactics: The War of the Lions
- Grid 2
- Hitman: Blood Money
- Lego Marvel Super Heroes
- MadWorld
- Mario & Sonic at the London 2012 Olympic Games
- Marvel Heroes
- Mega Man Star Force/Mega Man Star Force 2/Mega Man Star Force 3
- MS Saga: A New Dawn
- Naruto
- Ninja Gaiden II
- Ninja Gaiden Sigma 2
- Psychonauts
- Resonance of Fate
- Rise of Nightmares
- Rise of the Kasai
- Sonic the Hedgehog series (2010–present)
- Tactics Ogre: Let Us Cling Together (PSP only)
- Tokobot Plus
- Valkyria Chronicles/Valkyria Chronicles II
- Zatch Bell!
