= Prompto Argentum =

Supporting character of Final Fantasy XV

- Final Fantasy character
- Prompto Argentum, as depicted in Final Fantasy XV: A New Empire.
- First appearance: Brotherhood: Final Fantasy XV (2016)
- First game: Final Fantasy XV (2016)
- Created by: Tetsuya Nomura
- Designed by: Tetsuya Nomura; Hiromu Takahara
- Voiced by: English: Robbie Daymond Griffin Burns (child); Japanese: Tetsuya Kakihara Aki Kaneda (child)
- Motion capture: Yuichi Ito

Prompto Argentum (Japanese: プロンプト・アージェンタム, Hepburn: Puronputo Ājentamu) is a character from Square Enix's Final Fantasy series. He first appears in the anime web series Brotherhood: Final Fantasy XV as a schoolmate of the crown prince of the Kingdom of Lucis, Noctis Lucis Caelum. In the 2016 mainline title Final Fantasy XV, Prompto accompanies Noctis on his journey by road to meet and marry a noblewoman from another nation, and fights alongside him as they oppose the Niflheim empire. He is the title character of the post-launch downloadable content (DLC) pack Episode Prompto, which delves into the character's backstory and origin as a pawn of Niflheim.

Prompto was created and co-designed by Tetsuya Nomura for Final Fantasy Versus XIII, a spin-off title of the Fabula Nova Crystallis Final Fantasy series which was later reworked as Final Fantasy XV. A major element of Prompto's character is his humble origins when compared to the aristocratic families of Gladiolus and Ignis, the other members of Noctis' retinue, with his less cultured mannerisms being an obvious embodiment of that. Prompto is associated with the in-game photography mechanic of XV, which led to the development of a virtual reality (VR) demo starring the character which never saw a public release. Outside of Final Fantasy XV, Prompto is featured in adaptations of the game's universe in other media, as well as several crossover appearances.

Prompto was initially unpopular with series fans. This led to his visual design being revised, and the adaptation of the in-game photography mechanic as an extension of Prompto's personality to broaden his appeal as a character. Critical and fan reception towards Prompto following the release of XV improved significantly, with some critics citing him as one of the best characters of the XV universe.

== Concept and design ==
Prompto was originally created by Tetsuya Nomura as a main cast member of Final Fantasy Versus XIII, a spin-off title meant to be part of the Fabula Nova Crystallis sub-series. His facial features and hairstyle underwent multiple redesigns, with the more recent ones were largely based on negative feedback from fans. The final version of Prompto's attire consists of three different patterns made from what appears to be several different kind of fabrics. He wears a sleeveless top and the cuffs of his leopard print jeans are rolled up to impart a sense of proportion. As the only civilian member of the group, his casual outfit appears to reflect his personal style unlike the regimented clothing worn by his friends. The development team designed his photography hobby—and its subsequent gameplay and story interactions—as a way of making him useful and enabling each player to chronicle their journey throughout the game. Director Hajime Tabata defined Prompto's camera as a manifestation of Prompto's wish to record Noctis and Lunafreya's journey. Prompto's photography, directed by the game's artificial intelligence which take pictures of the players' exploits on their behalf, also serves as a form of involuntary recall function as the aforementioned pictures are offered to the player during each rest period with the option of preservation.

Prompto is voiced by Tetsuya Kakihara in Japanese and Robbie Daymond in English. Prompto's younger self is voiced by Aki Kaneda in Japanese and Griffin Burns in English. Daymond did not expect his audition for a role in XV to be successful as he had just concluded voice work for the English localization of Final Fantasy Type-0, and was pleasantly surprised when he learned that he secured a lead role in Prompto. Daymond noted that localization team and the voice actor decided to stop using the original Japanese audio as a reference early in the recording process outside of some limited applications such as technical matters. For Daymond, it was important for him to place his trust in the guidance provided by the game's director and producers, and being able to work with them to find the right voice for the character he plays.

The leader of the localiation team Dan Inoue based the English version of Prompto on the titular protagonist of Ferris Bueller's Day Off. When he first read for Prompto, Daymond realized that he represents the archetype of an upbeat stock character frequently used as a trope in the Final Fantasy series. Daymond and Inoue agreed that it was important to focus on presenting his relatability as a character, and Daymond decided not to consistently portray him as straightforward comedy relief throughout the entirety of his story arc, even though that is the character's designated role within the context of the game's narrative. Daymond felt that Prompto's characterization in the English localization ended up being more "grounded and human" compared to the original Japanese recording. While he acknowledged that XV is at its core a coming-of-age story for Noctis, Daymond said Prompto also undergoes a journey of self discovery himself for the duration of the game's narrative.

Prompto proved to be the starting point for Brotherhood, as he is producer Akio Ofuji's favorite character. Ofuji conceived the series based around wanting to expand upon a backstory surrounding his difficult childhood created during the game's development. Drawing from the character sheets created by the writers of XV, he created Prompto's scenario for Brotherhood from his background characteristics like his childhood obesity and loneliness. Another project centered on Prompto was Final Fantasy XV: VR Experience, a tech demo for a virtual reality (VR) simulation video game. At E3 2016, players had the opportunity to assume Prompto's perspective using a PlayStation VR headset, where they were driven around the game's world and could engage enemies in shooting sections. Originally slated to become available for free at an unspecified date following the release of XV, by August 2017 VR Experience was not released to the public as the developers wanted to avoid a thematic overlap with the then-upcoming Episode Prompto, which also features Prompto as its titular lead character. The project was reworked from a first-person shooter scenario into a fishing simulation title, Monster of the Deep: Final Fantasy XV.

== Appearances ==
=== Final Fantasy XV ===
Alongside Ignis Scientia and Gladiolus Amicitia, Prompto accompanies Noctis Lucis Caelum, crown prince of the Kingdom of Lucis, as Noctis embarks on a road journey to meet and marry his fiancé Lunafreya Nox Fleuret. A friend of Noctis from high school, Prompto is the most playful of the quartet: throughout XV, he continuously makes lighthearted quips, bursts out into song, makes puns, and even makes comments that break the fourth wall. He is particularly fascinated with chocobos and easily becomes smitten with women. On the other hand, he suffers from an inferiority complex next to his friends, due to his lack of noble heritage and self-esteem. Prompto is associated with the game's photography mechanic, where he constantly takes selfies or photos of others, and offers the player an opportunity to preserve them at the end of each rest day. Prompto wields a variety of firearms and machine-based ranged weaponry; when controlling Noctis, the player can issue him commands and co-opt moves with him.

Late in the game's narrative, Prompto is knocked off a train that is en route to Gralia, the capital city of the Niflheim empire, separating him from the group for a time. He is later discovered and rescued by his friends within an installation facility in Gralia, where he reveals that he is in fact the result of Niflheim's cloning experimentations to power its robotic army of magically infused Magitek infantry. Soon afterwards, Prompto is separated from Noctis for nearly a decade, and the world is overwhelmed by a plague of darkness and monstrous daemons unleashed by Ardyn Izunia, the chancellor of the Niflheim empire. Following their reunion a decade later, Prompto accompanies Noctis to his final confrontation with Ardyn in the ruins of Insomnia, the former Lucian capital.

Prompto's backstory is explored in further detail in the titular DLC expansion, Episode Prompto, where he is retrieved by Niflheim forces after he fell from the train and detained in a research facility. Prompto discovers that he is a clone of Niflheim's chief scientist, Verstael Besithia, and was stolen from the laboratory that created him by Lucian spies. A barcode on Prompto's wrist, which he kept concealed at all times, is a reminder of his true origin. Alongside the mercenary Aranea Highwind, a former agent of Niflheim whom he befriends, Prompto confronts and defeats Verstael, who had transferred his consciousness into a gigantic war machine. Prompto continues his journey to Gralia in the aftermath, but is unaware that he is followed by Ardyn.

=== Other appearances ===
Episode 2: Dogged Runner from Brotherhood: Final Fantasy XV tells the story of Prompto's lonely childhood and how he meets Noctis at school. Raised by foster parents in Lucis, Prompto is portrayed as an obese child who meets one of Lunafreya's canine companions, Pryna, by chance and cares for her. After receiving a letter of appreciation from Lunafreya, Prompto decides to improve his situation by adopting an upbeat outlook towards life, and build his self-esteem by losing weight and becoming a more confident person in the process. By the end of the episode, Prompto properly befriends Noctis as a teenager.

Prompto has appeared in numerous video games outside of Final Fantasy XV and its associated downloadable content.

== Promotion and reception ==
In early 2016, action figures of Prompto alongside Noctis, Gladiolus, and Ignis were produced by Play Arts Kai and distributed for sale by Square Enix on its online store to promote the then-upcoming release of Final Fantasy XV.

Shortly after the release of the Final Fantasy XV: Episode Duscae demo in March 2015, Tabata and his team discovered that Prompto came last in a popularity survey, falling behind several minor characters featured alongside the main cast, and was generally disliked by series fans. This motivated the development team to put more effort into redesigning Prompto's appearance and redefining his in-game role, as they wanted all four members of the group to be equally popular or likeable. The team later realized that the game's photography feature is a viable approach to bring him closer to players, and made it a part of his character. The character's reception with players would improve following the launch of XV in November 2016. For example, Prompto ranked No. 38 in the Top 75 of NHK's "All-Final Fantasy Grand Poll of Japanese players" in 2020, which tallied over 468,000 votes. Critics like Brendan Caldwell from Rock, Paper, Shotgun have observed that fans have reacted positively to Prompto's role as an in-game photographer. Prompto is recognized as one of Robbie Daymond's most iconic or notable characters. Daymond's decision to record a personalized, in-character Christmas greeting dedicated to the daughter of a fan in 2016 received media attention and was met with praise.

Several critics from numerous video game publications have expressed their appreciation for the character. Dennis Carden from Destructoid chose Prompto as his favourite video game character from 2016. He described him as an example of a well-executed comic relief character, because his antics are used judiciously without hindering the overall experience. Carden also found that Prompto always reacts appropriately whenever the story of XV takes a darker turn, which is balanced by the brief moments of levity provided by Prompto's friendly and upbeat personality. Ethan Gach from Kotaku observed that he stood out among the voiced characters of the Final Fantasy series, as few have had a fleshed out backstory or has been as charming with the sense of fun they impart as Prompto. Ed Thorn from Rock, Paper, Shotgun said he is very fond of Prompto, more than any other AI-controlled video game companion character he had encountered, and suggested that he would be a welcome presence in every game he plays. Andrew Webster from The Verge said Prompto's photos are a critical narrative tool, which help players tell their own stories while creating a deeper connection with the game's cast. Salvatore Pane from Paste Magazine considered Prompto to be the "heart" of the group; he wrote at length about how Prompto's antics helped him recall happier memories of his younger years, and how deeply the character's desperate need for validation resonated with him. Allegra Frank and Simone de Rochefort from Polygon as well as Gita Jackson from Kotaku have expressed their appreciation for the character's visual appeal and physical attractiveness.

Some critics have singled out Prompto's character development and story arc across multiple media for praise. Michelle Nguyen from Geek.com was impressed with the character work for Prompto in Episode 2: Dogged Runner, and elaborate how it turned an unlikable character who comes across as a blonde stereotype on first impression into a "multi-dimensional, interesting guy" who earned his place in the main cast. Carden liked the scenes where Prompto confides in Noctis about his insecurities, which in his opinion makes the character far more relatable than he could have otherwise been. Jason Schreier and Ash Parrish, who have both written for Kotaku, opined that individuals like Prompto who hide their insecurity and emotional fragility beneath an outward veneer of cheerfulness and pluckiness are very common in real life friend groups, which reinforces the character's relatability. Reviews of Episode Prompto generally praised Prompto's portrayal and storyline despite some clichéd or clashing elements, and all lauded his interactions with Aranea. Parrish was surprised by how closely she identified with a character whose physical appearance differs greatly from her, as on an emotional level she claimed to have experienced the same feelings of anxiety and self-loathing as Prompto when it comes to her social interactions. A criticism she offered was that the side story of Prompto's discovery of his true origin was entirely absent in the base game, which she argued undercuts the narrative impact of the disclosure of his identity following his reunion with his friends.
