= Yasuhiro Takato =

Japanese voice actor (born 1968)

- 高戸 靖広
- Born: January 23, 1968 (age 58); Okayama, Japan
- Occupation: Voice actor
- Years active: 1987–present
- Employer: Aoni Production
- Notable credit: Sailor Moon as Artemis

Yasuhiro Takato (Japanese: 高戸 靖広, romanized: Takato Yasuhiro, born January 23, 1968) is a Japanese voice actor affiliated with Aoni Production.

== Filmography ==
=== Television animation ===
- Sailor Moon (1992) – Artemis
- Ping-Pong Club (1995) – Tanaka
- Digimon Adventure (1999) – Elecmon
- Hunter × Hunter (1999) – Shalnark
- One Piece (1999) – Buffalo / Butchie / Mr. 9 / Satori / Hotori / Kotori / Wanze / Aobire / Peterman / Bepo / Zepo
- Mobile Suit Gundam SEED (2002) – Kuzzey Buskirk / Romero Pal
- Bobobo-bo Bo-bobo (2003) – Mesopotamion Guy / Haou
- Fullmetal Alchemist (2003) – Gluttony
- Zatch Bell! (2003) – Byonko
- Xenosaga: The Animation (2005) – Hammer
- Kamisama Kazoku (2006) – Suguru
- Desert Punk (2007) – Haruo Kawaguchi
- Dragon Ball Kai (2009) – Gurd / Yamu
- Hetalia: Axis Powers (2009) – Russia
- Digimon Xros Wars (2010) – IceDevimon
- Toriko (2011) – Cumin
- Meganebu (2013) – Kugishima Sachie
- World Trigger (2014) – Shōhei Kodera
- Maho Girls PreCure! (2016, eps. 1–26, 50) – Yamoh
- Dragon Ball Super (2016) – Botamo and Agu
- Digimon Universe: Appli Monsters (2016) – Gomimon
- My Hero Academia (2016) – Principal Nezu
- Zombie Land Saga (2018) – Romero
- Hetalia: World Stars (2021) – Russia
- Zombie Land Saga Revenge (2021) – Romero
- Dragon Quest: The Adventure of Dai (2022) – Goroa
- Scum of the Brave (2026) – Moguri no Maruta

==== Unknown date ====
- GeGeGe no Kitarō (90s), Kuppa, Sara Kozo, Obariyon, Satori

=== Animated films ===
- Mobile Suit Gundam F91 (1991) – San Erg
- Sailor Moon R: The Movie (1993) – Artemis
- Sailor Moon S: The Movie (1994) – Artemis
- Sailor Moon Super S: The Movie (1995) – Artemis
- Tamagotchi Honto no Hanashi (1997, Short) – Tamagotchi Hoshi
- Doraemon: Nobita Drifts in the Universe (1999) – Boy A
- Kinnikuman Nisei: Muscle-Man Competition! Great War (2002) – El Kaerun
- Mobile Suit Gundam SEED: Special Edition (2002–2003, TV Series) – Kuzzey Buskirk / Romero Pal
- Doraemon: Nobita and the Windmasters (2003) – Storm's Underling
- Fullmetal Alchemist the Movie: Conqueror of Shamballa (2005) – Gluttony
- Doraemon: Nobita's Dinosaur 2006 (2006) – Minion
- Dōbutsu no Mori (2006) – Saruo
- Doraemon: Nobita's New Great Adventure into the Underworld (2007) – Devil Bat
- Doraemon: Nobita and the Green Giant Legend (2008) – Soldier B
- GeGeGe no Kitarō: Nippon Bakuretsu! (2008) – Kasa-bake
- Doraemon: The New Record of Nobita's Spaceblazer (2009) – Guard B
- One Piece Film Strong World (2009) – Billy
- Doraemon: Nobita's Great Battle of the Mermaid King (2010) – Soldier C
- Hetalia Axis Powers:Paint It, White! (2010) – Russia
- Tansuwarashi (2011, Short) – Jirokichi
- Doraemon: Nobita's Secret Gadget Museum (2013) – Gorgon's Spell
- GAMBA (2015) – Bōbo
- Digimon Adventure tri. (2017) – Elecmon

=== Video games ===
- Abalaburn as Pooly
- BS Zelda no Densetsu Inishie no Sekiban as Fortune Teller
- Crash Nitro Kart as Zem
- Disgaea 4 as Koji
- Dragon Quest Treasures as Porcus
- Ratchet & Clank as Big Al

==== Tokusatsu ====
- Juukou B-Fighter (1995, TV Series) Garinezu / Ghost Kaijin Army
- Gekisou Sentai Carranger (1996, Episode: "Bad Wisdom, Merging Caution") – JJ Jetton
  - Carranger vs. Ohranger (1997) – SS Sutatanzo
- Hyakujuu Sentai GaoRanger (2001, Episode: "Which is the Real One!?") – Copy Org
- Tokusou Sentai Dekaranger (2004, 2 episodes) – Quotaian Dagonel
- Mahou Sentai Magiranger (2005, TV Series) – Heavenly Saint Raigel / Madou Priest Meemy
- Juuken Sentai Gekiranger (2007, Episode: "We Muni-Muni!") – Confrontation Beast Fox-Fist Tsuneki
- Engine Sentai Go-onger (2008, Episode: "Friendship's Punch" Savage Water Barbaric Machine Beast Straw Banki
- Kamen Rider W (2009–2010, TV Series) – Smilodon Dopant
- Tensou Sentai Goseiger (2010, Episode: "Out of Control Gosei Power") – Totsneho Alien Fandaho of Nonsense
- Kaizoku Sentai Gokaiger (2011, Episode: "The Abare Quick-Changing New Combination") – Daiyarl
- Tokumei Sentai Go-Busters (2012, Episode: "An Out of Control Combo to Escape the Labyrinth!") – Mushikagoloid
- Zyuden Sentai Kyoryuger (2013, Episode: "Vacance! The Eternal Holiday") – Debo Vaacance
  - Zyuden Sentai Kyoryuger Returns: Hundred Years After (2014) – Debo Natsudamonne
- Kamen Rider × Kamen Rider Ghost & Drive: Super Movie War Genesis (2015) – Ganma Superior A
- Doubutsu Sentai Zyuohger (2016, Episode: "Unhappy Camera") – as Jashinger
- Kaitou Sentai Lupinranger VS Keisatsu Sentai Patranger (2018, Episode: "Love Is an Indispensable Part of Life") – Demeran Yatmis
- Mashin Sentai Kiramager (2020) – Carantula

=== Dubbing roles ===
==== Live-action ====
- Boy Meets World, Frankie Stichino
- Jurassic World (2017 NTV edition), Mr. DNA
- Lost, Hugo Hurley Reyes
- The Three Musketeers, Planchet

==== Animation ====
- Monsters, Inc. – Thaddeus Bile
- Pucca – Garu / Dada
- Thomas the Tank Engine & Friends – Edward (Season 1–8) / Arthur (Season 7–8) / Ned
- Timon & Pumbaa – A Snobbish Elephant (one episode)
