= Tuxedo Mask =

Character in Sailor Moon

- Sailor Moon character
- Tuxedo Mask as drawn by Naoko Takeuchi
- First appearance: Sailor Moon chapter 1: "Usagi - Sailor Moon" (1991)
- Created by: Naoko Takeuchi
- Voiced by: Japanese: Tōru Furuya; Kenji Nojima (Sailor Moon Crystal); English: Rino Romano (DiC dub); Toby Proctor (DiC dub); Vince Corazza (CWi dub); Robbie Daymond (Viz dub)

In-universe information
- Full name: Mamoru Chiba
- Aliases: Prince Endymion (past life name); King Endymion; Endou (manga); Moonlight Knight (anime); Metaria Endymion (PGSM); Space Knight (musicals)
- Family: Mr. Chiba (father, deceased); Mrs. Chiba (mother, deceased)
- Spouse: Sailor Moon / Neo-Queen Serenity (wife)
- Children: Small Lady (daughter)
- Nationality: Japanese
- Affiliations: Sailor Guardians; Dark Kingdom (while brainwashed); Shadow Galactica (manga and Sailor Moon Crystal)
- Powers and Abilities: Psychic powers Use of roses as darts Energy projection

Tuxedo Mask (Japanese: タキシード仮面, Hepburn: Takishīdo Kamen), also known as Mamoru Chiba (地場 衛, Chiba Mamoru; renamed Darien Shields in some English adaptations), is a fictional character and one of the primary protagonists of the Sailor Moon media franchise created by Naoko Takeuchi. He disguises himself to support the series' central heroines, the Sailor Guardians. Wearing a mask to conceal his identity, he interferes with enemy operations, offers the Sailor Guardians advice, and sometimes physically aids them in battle.

Like the Sailor Guardians, Tuxedo Mask possesses a power item: a Sailor Crystal, which gives him guardianship over the planet Earth. He also has psychic powers, including psychometry and healing, which evolve and become important to the storyline in the manga, but which play only a minor role and remain static in the anime. Along with his primary love interest Sailor Moon, a significant player in much of the story, he has royal credentials in the "past life" storyline as well as in the future.

== Profile ==
Mamoru Chiba first appears as a high-school student studying at Moto-Azabu High School. Before the beginning of the series, his parents are killed in a car crash on his sixth birthday, which revealed the memories of his previous life as Prince Endymion. Living alone, Mamoru befriends school student Usagi Tsukino. In the beginning of the series, dreams of Princess Serenity haunt Mamoru. Unaware of his dual-identity as Tuxedo Mask, he suffers painful visions whenever Usagi becomes endangered, and he transforms unknowingly into Tuxedo Mask. As Mamoru, he tries to piece together his strange dreams, and as Tuxedo Mask, he tries to remember his past and identity, while searching for Princess Serenity. He seeks the Legendary Silver Crystal in the belief that this will fully restore his previous memories. In the anime adaptation, he seeks it because Princess Serenity tells him to in a dream. Of all the characters, Mamoru gets brainwashed and captured the most throughout the series.

Mamoru and Usagi share romantic feelings well before they discover their identities. Once they became a couple, they remain deeply devoted to each other and their love survives many trials. In the manga they briefly show jealousy towards each other. Usagi always addresses him as "Mamo" (まもちゃん) throughout the series during this time-period (Chibiusa also addresses him with this nickname later on). After dating for two years, Mamoru gives Usagi an engagement ring at an airport. Five years later, Mamoru and Usagi marry. In the future, they become king and queen and have a child together whom they name "Small Lady", known in the majority of the series as "Chibiusa".

Mamoru Chiba as seen in the 1990s anime

Mamoru struggles with his identity and function throughout the series, worrying first about his true nature, then later whether he gets in the way of the Sailor Guardians. A fair amount of subtle characterization is made for Mamoru, and later extending his role within the manga as to who he is. He also is given the power of psychometry, which also showed up in the anime, but was not given a name. This manifests in his ability to see and read dreams (such as Chibiusa's), to heal people and to monitor the status of the Earth. This does not develop fully until the Black Moon arc, and is used occasionally throughout the series.

In the original anime adaptation, Mamoru is a generally outgoing person, though somewhat acerbic, and appears as a college student. He demonstrates interests in a variety of subjects and emerges as smart. The musical Kakyu Ouhi Kourin shows that he is aspiring to become a doctor. He also "dates" Rei Hino for a short time before the revelation of all the past-life identities, though he believes they are just friends. This history stirs jealousy in Usagi in later seasons. Sailor Moon Crystal, the second anime adaptation, follows the manga continuity and thus has Mamoru as a high school student, without much interaction with Rei. Unlike the original anime, Mamoru and Usagi start getting along relatively quickly instead of having to warm up to each other.

Most of Sailor Moon's transformations and final victories come as a result of her and Tuxedo Mask cooperating together. In the final battle against the Dark Kingdom, Queen Metaria absorbs Sailor Moon and Tuxedo Mask into her body. However, they succeed in combining their powers through the Silver Crystal and destroy Queen Metalia from within. Tuxedo Mask also combines his power into Super Sailor Moon's last item with the rest of the Guardians using the Golden Crystal. In the Infinity story arc he combines his powers with Sailor Moon to create the next scepter. This happens in episode 91, "The Rod of Love is born: Usagi's New Transformation." The manga tends to show Mamoru as quiet, studious, mysterious and stoic. The student body of his high school often admires him for these qualities. The anime adaptation also tends to make him appear in every episode to save Sailor Moon's life. His attacks in the anime resemble those shown in the manga, but are not named.

In the musical adaptations, Mamoru protects Usagi and generally appears at her side. However, several of his relationships change in different settings: for example, one musical reveals Queen Beryl as Mamoru's fiancé from his time as Prince of the Earth. Associating with Silver Millennium was against Earth law, and Endymion violated this law when he fell in love with Princess Serenity. In this version of events, Serenity and Endymion are outlaws (similar to Romeo and Juliet) who drive an otherwise innocent woman, Beryl, to evil by making her jealous. Sailor Pluto also reveals that she is in love with Endymion, though she has contented herself with watching from afar.

Another variation occurs in the Ryuusei Densetsu musical, when Galaxia does not kill Mamoru, leaving him able to fight alongside the Sailor Guardians. Mamoru typically gets very involved in the Sailor Guardians' battles, fighting alongside them as opposed to his anime role of throwing a rose and then letting Sailor Moon deliver the finishing blow.

Tuxedo Mask always gets his own song; these songs vary from musical to musical. One musical featured multiple songs as both the present Mamoru appeared as Tuxedo Mask and later King Endymion appeared in disguise as Space Knight to look out for Chibiusa.

In the live-action series, Mamoru is a more silent, yet dedicated person. For example, he stays loyal to his girlfriend Hina, despite not loving her, on the basis of a promise they made as children. He searches for the Silver Crystal due to his amnesia: dreams told him that the magical object could restore his memories. To do this, he donned the Tuxedo Mask disguise and became a thief, searching for the Silver Crystal. Once he regained his memories of his past and present lives, he assumed his Endymion form to help the Sailor Guardians and tried his best to protect Usagi from the dangers of overusing the Silver Crystal. However, because of his dedication he has to join the Dark Kingdom or the Four Kings of Heaven will be killed. He also joins to keep a promise with Usagi that they will not destroy the planet. Learning that the Silver Crystal made Metaria stronger every time Sailor Moon used it, Endymion took Metaria into his body before succumbing to its dark power. Now an evil parody of himself, Dark Prince Endymion, he almost kills Sailor Mercury when Sailor Moon was forced to kill him to stop Metaria, causing Sailor Moon to kill herself but they survive. However they were saved. Mamo's pocket watch stops the sword from through Sailor Moon. His knights from a past life'gems saves him though the knights were killed. He revives once Sailor Moon manages to finally control the Crystal's power and destroys Metaria for good.

== Aspects and forms ==
As a character with different incarnations, special powers, transformations, and a long lifetime spanning the Silver Millennium era and the 30th century, Mamoru gains multiple aspects and aliases as the series progresses.

=== Tuxedo Mask ===
"Tuxedo Mask" represents a disguise Mamoru created for himself in order to hunt for the Silver Crystal incognito and—later—to assist the Sailor Guardians in battle. In addition to his white mask, he wears a full-dress tailcoat (as opposed to the dinner jacket of an actual tuxedo) with a red-lined black cape, white gloves, and a top hat. In the anime and live-action series, he carries a black baton which he uses like a sword. He takes the place of Sailor Earth.

The anime shows him standing on poles, defying gravity, and acting as a "swoop-in" type. He appears less developed, and has no special powers or named attacks, but remains a constant force in helping the Sailor Guardians throughout the series when they are in trouble. At the beginning he cannot control the transformation and his body automatically (and painfully) transforms if Sailor Moon is in danger. By the end of the first story arc, he can willingly activate the transformation. In a stylized henshin sequence, this is indicated by pulling a rose out of his pocket which then changes colors, and his tuxedo and mask fly in. Later in the series he is shown transforming instantaneously.

In the manga, he starts out as an ordinary thief trying to find the Silver Crystal. Luna initially tells Usagi not to trust him, but relents when they begin to fall in love and his true identity emerges. His function goes beyond that of the rescuer portrayed so often in the anime – it is frequently Sailor Moon who goes to his rescue, and he lends her strength, support, and guidance to use the Silver Crystal to defeat the enemies in return.

In the fourth story arc of the manga Helios reinforces Tuxedo Mask's role as a hero by revealing that he, as the Prince of the Golden Kingdom, Elysion, possesses a holy stone in the same way that the Princess of the Silver Millennium owns the Silver Crystal. This holy stone is the Golden Crystal, the Sailor Crystal of the Earth.

=== Prince Endymion ===
Endymion in the live-action adaptation

Prince Endymion (プリンス・エンディミオン, Purinsu Endimion) was the crown prince of planet Earth during the age of Silver Millennium and Mamoru's identity in his previous life. He resided in the Golden Kingdom, which protected the Earth from within. Even though he and Elysion's guardian Helios never met each other in person during that time, they shared the common desire to protect the planet. Endymion also had four guardians, the Four Kings of Heaven, who protected him. He and Princess Serenity fell in love, breaking the taboo between their peoples which was exploited by Queen Metaria when she corrupted the people of Earth. Being killed by Beryl when she attempted to kill Serenity, the 90s anime depicting his death with the princess committed by Metaria herself, Prince Endymion is reincarnated in the 20th century as Mamoru Chiba.

The manga often portrays Prince Endymion as the silent protagonist; his past life remains a mystery. Mamoru usually does not transform into Prince Endymion willfully, but is usually used as a power-up from his Tuxedo Mask form. Mamoru was under Metaria's thralldom, he assumed an evil form of Endymion and used his power to hypnotize Motoki Furuhata to assume he was his best friend "Endou". In the 90s anime, Mamoru can transform into Prince Endymion. Often this occurs when Sailor Moon transforms into Princess Serenity. As in the manga, he wears black armor.

In the live-action series, Endymion wears white, and after obtaining this form it becomes Mamoru's primary combat form. He gains the power of teleportation, a power shared by the Four Kings of Heaven. After he takes Metaria into his body, his armor and accessories blacken as he becomes known as Metaria Endymion with trace remnants of his white armor in his possessed state.

=== King Endymion ===
Later in the series Mamoru emerges as King Endymion, King of 30th-century Crystal Tokyo. He is the husband of Neo-Queen Serenity, and father of Chibiusa. As king of Crystal Tokyo his royal garments are a white and lavender tuxedo, as well as a royal staff. King Endymion's first appearance is at the end of manga and Crystal Act 18. He is not actually in a physical form but a spiritual entity guarding the Crystal Palace while his real body sleeps. During this time he helps to guide the Sailor Guardians and his past self against the Dark Moon Kingdom. It is then revealed to the Sailor Guardians that Mamoru never aged due to the Silver Crystal's power. It is the ghost of King Endymion who instructs Tuxedo Mask in the first use of his attack "Tuxedo La Smoking Bomber." Prince Endymion becomes King at the end of the battle with the Dead Moon Circus when Helios, the priest of his former home, Elysion, hands him his sacred golden crystal atop his king's staff. After this, both Tuxedo Mask and Sailor Moon turn into their respective future selves, all of the Sailor Guardians transform into their princess forms. However, after this point, Mamoru is not seen in this form again.

The anime shows King Endymion only in the future as the father of Small Lady and the King of Crystal Tokyo. He also appears as a computerized image when they first meet him. However, he is never shown to fight in battle. Diana makes a comment about the future King and Queen. She says in SuperS that the King and Queen like to fake being sick to be excused from attending important banquets and meetings. In the original English dub, he was not referred to as Endymion; only the "King of the Earth" or "The King" or "King Darien".

=== Moonlight Knight ===
Mamoru as Moonlight Knight

Moonlight Knight (月影の騎士, Tsukikage no Kishi), clad in Arabian robes while possessing a saber and white roses, appears in the 1990s anime during the "Hell Tree" arc of Sailor Moon R. When Usagi wished to be a normal girl at the end of the 90s depiction of the "Dark Kingdom" arc, Mamoru was included with the Sailor Guardians' memories being magically sealed to resume civilian lives. But Mamoru's subconscious desire to protect Usagi caused his sealed memories to leave his body and assume physical form as Moonlight Knight, existing independently from Mamoru. Like with Tuxedo Mask, with even Mamoru a suspect, Usagi assumed every cute guy she met was Moonlight Knight before learning his true identity. It was only once Mamoru recovered his memories and regained his ability of becoming Tuxedo Mask that Moonlight Knight ceased to exist and reintegrated back into Mamoru's being.

== Special powers and items ==
Tuxedo Mask using Tuxedo La Smoking Bomber in Sailor Moon Crystal

Even in civilian form, Mamoru demonstrates a variety of psychic powers throughout each series. In both the anime and manga he uses psychometry to read past, present, and future events through touch, and heals others' wounds through psychokinesis. Inconsistently, he is shown teleporting; just once in the anime while under Queen Beryl's power, and several times as Prince Endymion in the live-action series.

Mamoru also demonstrates a spiritual connection with Usagi: he can detect when she has transformed into Sailor Moon. Early on in the anime series, before they become friends, this connection forcibly transforms Mamoru into Tuxedo Mask so that he can protect her. In later episodes, he seems to have control over his transformations, although he still shows up shortly after the start of most of the battles, no matter how far away from the developing situation.

On one occasion the anime gives Tuxedo Mask a stylized transformation sequence, with his tuxedo and accessories forming around him as he flings a rose. He does not shout any special phrase, although his voice-actor jokingly ad-libbed the line "Tuxedo Power! Make up!" He also acquires a transformation in the live-action series, using the same phrase, which is a part of an outrageous story he tells Usagi about how he became Tuxedo Mask. This transformation is initiated with a special band-aid, and the sequence consists of Mamoru pulling on his pants and coat with dramatic flair.

Once transformed, Tuxedo Mask displays additional powers. In the anime shows these as mainly physical, while the manga depicts them as rare and magical. His iconic mainstay in the anime involves the use of roses, thrown like darts to injure or distract enemies. He can also twirl them or throw a wide array to block attacks, or can throw many at a time to pin an enemy down. He seems to have an unlimited supply of these roses, which are supernaturally strong and embed themselves in most any material, including concrete. In addition, when Mamoru takes on different forms or aspects, his roses change color accordingly. Tuxedo Mask's roses are red, the evil Prince Endymion's are black (and electrified), and the Moonlight Knight's are white.

Tuxedo Mask's secondary weapon, his cane, often serves as a sword, and he can extend its length, either to attack or to rescue people. As both Prince Endymion and Moonlight Knight, he uses real swords of different styles.

In the manga, Tuxedo Mask can blast energy from his hand, crying out "Tuxedo La Smoking Bomber!" He also has a combination attack with his daughter, Sailor Chibi Moon: "Pink Sugar Tuxedo Attack." The musicals reproduce this attack, and in the second anime, he gradually learns to use it over the course of the first season.

Mamoru's most important magical possession in the manga, the Golden Crystal, serves as both his star seed and as the Sailor Crystal of the Earth. He uses it in combination with Sailor Moon's Silver Crystal to defend the Solar System. In the anime, although Mamoru has the "golden star seed" of Earth, it differs from the Golden Crystal, which instead is possessed by Pegasus and can be used by people with good intentions.

== Development ==
Takeuchi designed the character of Tuxedo Mask as her own ideal of a man, describing him as "strong, silent, unshakeable, a little like Captain Harlock." Takeuchi based his design on Shonentai member Noriyuki Higashiyama and she also took inspiration from Kaito Kid, the main character of the manga Magic Kaito by Gosho Aoyama. Takeuchi originally intended his persona as Tuxedo Mask to "have more mysteries and take a greater role."

The kanji in Mamoru's surname translate as "earth" (地, chi) and "place" (場, ba). Together, they form the term "local," with a pun on his identity as Endymion, Prince of Earth. His given name means "protect" (衛, mamoru).

Originally Naoko Takeuchi used the codename "Mysterious 2098 Face" for Tuxedo Mask. She later expressed bewilderment at herself for the idea. Although Takeuchi had designed his costume herself, she found it difficult to draw, as it had many parts to it; she often forgot to draw parts of it in the early manga. She later had the same problem with Sailor Galaxia's costume.

Tōru Furuya stated in a making-of extra that he had an influence on the development of the anime persona of Tuxedo Mask. When asked about any differences between the anime and manga counterparts, he ad-libbed "I'm driving." Because of this, Tuxedo Mask became more comical.

The name Endymion fits particularly appropriately as a reference to Greek mythology. The Greek Endymion falls in love with Selene, the Greek goddess of the moon.

=== Actors ===
Mamoru Chiba was originally voiced by Tōru Furuya in the first Japanese anime series and related media. Furuya described the role as "very special to me." Mamoru was voiced by Kenji Nojima in Sailor Moon Crystal and all media since. In the DIC and Cloverway English adaptations, his name is changed to Darien Chiba and his voice is first provided by Rino Romano for the first eleven episodes, Toby Proctor for the next fifty-five episodes, and Vince Corazza for the rest of the series and its films. In the Viz Media English dub, Mamoru's voice is supplied by Robbie Daymond.

In the stage musicals, different actors and actresses have played Mamoru: Mizuki Sano, Yūta Mochizuki, Yuuta Enomoto, Kousei Amano, Hidemasa Edo, Kenji Urai, Yuu Shirota, Gyo Miyamoto, Yūga Yamato, Mikako Ishii, Riona Tatemichi, and Mitsuki Tenju. Creator Naoko Takeuchi has described Sano's portrayal of Mamoru as "a cute, sweet boy." Yūta Mochizuki, the longest-running among the musical actors, went on to perform as King Endymion during Fumina Hara's musicals.

In the live action series, Mamoru was portrayed by Jouji Shibue.

== Reception and influence ==
The official Sailor Moon-character popularity-polls listed Mamoru Chiba, Tuxedo Mask, and Endymion as separate entities. In 1992, readers ranked Tuxedo Mask as the twelfth most popular character, Prince Endymion as the fifteenth most popular character, and Mamoru Chiba as the sixteenth most popular character out of thirty eight choices. One year later, now with fifty choices, King Endymion became the eighteenth most popular character, while Tuxedo Mask and Mamoru came in at twentieth and twenty-first respectively. Moonlight Knight, being an anime only form, was never included in the manga popularity polls. Tuxedo Mask was the fourth favorite male character in a May 1993 Animage poll, and Mamoru was seventh the following year.

Although Takeuchi herself had a soft spot for Mamoru, she has said that friends complained to her about Usagi being in love with "such a useless guy." He has been described as being both a "dashing hero" and a "boy-damsel in distress" by Jonathan Clements and Helen McCarthy. He has even been called a "liability" and a "burden," his relationship with Usagi being described as a child-mother relationship rather than that of a principality couple. Usagi is said to show him amae, or "indulgent love." When compared to male leads of male-targeted series, Mamoru, although unafraid of girls, seems uncomfortable with them. He also gives the impression of a "character who never laughs or has fun": "noble, passive and effectively totally ineffectual."

The image of the top hat and cape also influenced the early making of "Tuxedo Umino Mask" ("Tuxedo Melvin" in the original dub) in the anime. In this particular episode, Umino tries to impress Naru by dressing up like Tuxedo Mask. This image was also used later in the manga for Tubby Mask for the manga short story "Chibiusa's Picture Diary #4: The Secret Hammer Price Hall". This character was based on Makoto Hanmatsuura, who bid ¥2 million in a charity auction for the Kobe earthquake disaster to be put in the Sailor Moon manga.

== See also ==
- Endymion (crater), lunar crater
- Endymion (mythology)
- Black tie
