= Getting Gotti =

1994 American television film

- Genre: Crime; Drama
- Written by: James S. Henerson
- Directed by: Roger Young
- Starring: Lorraine Bracco; Anthony Denison; August Schellenberg
- Theme music composer: Patrick Williams
- Country of origin: United States
- Original language: English

Production
- Executive producers: Donald Kushner; Peter Locke
- Producer: John M. Eckert
- Production location: Toronto
- Cinematography: Ron Stannett
- Editors: Terry Blythe; Benjamin A. Weissman
- Running time: 89 minutes
- Production company: The Kushner-Locke Company

Original release
- Network: CBS
- Release: May 10, 1994

Getting Gotti is a 1994 American television film centered on an Assistant United States Attorney named Diane Giacalone, and her attempts to build a Racketeer Influenced and Corrupt Organizations Act (RICO) case against John Gotti and the Gambino crime family. It was shot in Toronto, Ontario. The film premiered on May 10, 1994, on CBS.

== Cast ==
- Lorraine Bracco as Diane Giacalone, assistant attorney for the Eastern District of New York
- Anthony John Denison as John Gotti
- Ellen Burstyn as Jo Giacalone
- Kaitlyn Anello as Angela
- Kathleen Laskey as Cassie
- August Schellenberg as Willie Boy Johnson
- Kenneth Welsh as Bennett
- Jeremy Ratchford as Harvey Sanders
- Ron Gabriel as Sammy 'The Bull' Gravano
- Peter Boretski as Aniello Dellacroce
- Gene DiNovi as Gambino Boss Paul Castellano
