= Momoiro Clover Z discography =

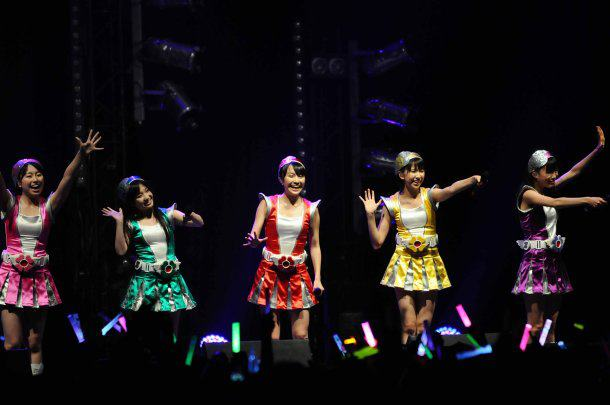
- Momoiro Clover Z performing at the 2012 Japan Expo
- Studio albums: 7
- Singles: 17 (19)
- Video albums: 12
- Music videos: 18 (20)

The discography of the Japanese female idol group Momoiro Clover Z consists of 7 full-length studio albums and over 20 singles.

== Albums ==
=== Studio albums ===
No.	Title	Release date	Oricon Weekly Albums Chart	Sales (Oricon)		Certification (RIAJ)
No.	Title	Release date	Oricon Weekly Albums Chart	First week	Total	Certification (RIAJ)
1	Battle and Romance (バトル アンド ロマンス, Batoru ando Romansu)	July 27, 2011; April 10, 2013*	3; 2*	23,967; 37,594*	182,083	Gold
2	5th Dimension (5TH DIMENSION, Fifusu Dimenshon)	April 10, 2013	1	180,282	240,099	Platinum
3	Amaranthus (AMARANTHUS, Amaransasu)	February 17, 2016	2	80,783	96,795	Gold
4	Hakkin no Yoake (白金の夜明け)	February 17, 2016	1	81,254	97,482	Gold
5	Momoiro Clover Z (ももいろクローバーZ)	May 17, 2019	1	61,757	65,675	
6	Shukuten (祝典)	May 17, 2022	2	26,110	27,169	
7	Idola (イドラ)	May 8, 2024	5	17,251	TBA	

* When the two limited editions of Battle and Romance were re-released on April 10, 2013, the album updated its peak position to 2nd, selling approx. 38,000 copies in the re-release week

=== Compilation albums ===
No.	Title	Release date	Oricon Weekly Albums Chart	Sales (Oricon)		Certification (RIAJ)
No.	Title	Release date	Oricon Weekly Albums Chart	First week	Total	Certification (RIAJ)
1	Iriguchi no Nai Deguchi (入口のない出口; "Exit with No Entrance")	June 5, 2013	6; 2*	14,023; 69,125*	103,913	RIAJ: Gold
2	MCZ Winter Song Collection	December 23, 2016	5	23,917	31,600	
3	MOMOIRO CLOVER Z BEST ALBUM "Momo mo Jyu, Bancha mo Debana" (桃も十、番茶も出花; "Everything has its time")	May 23, 2018	1	56,412	100,000	RIAJ: Gold
4	ZZ's	January 31, 2020	—			
5	TDF LIVE BEST	July 3, 2020	—			
6	Tanaka Masahiro (田中将大)	February 24, 2021	7			
7	ZZ's II	May 17, 2021	— (Note: "ZZ's II" did not enter Oricon Weekly Albums Ranking, but peaked at number 1 on the component Oricon Weekly Digital Album Ranking.)	7,887		
8	MOMOIRO CLOVER Z 6th ALBUM TOUR "Shukuten" (Live at Nippon Budokan 2022.5.15) (MOMOIRO CLOVER Z 6th ALBUM TOUR "祝典"(Live at 日本武道館 2022.5.15))	July 29, 2022	— (Note: "MOMOIRO CLOVER Z 6th ALBUM TOUR "Shukuten" (Live at Nippon Budokan 2022.5.15)" did not enter Oricon Weekly Albums Ranking, but peaked at number 6 on the component Oricon Weekly Digital Album Ranking.)	677		
7	ZZ's III	April 7, 2023	— (Note: "ZZ's III" did not enter Oricon Weekly Albums Ranking, but peaked at number 2 on the component Oricon Weekly Digital Album Ranking.)	4,119		
8	Yoyogi Mugendai Kinenbi (Live at Yoyogi National Stadium 1st Gymnasium 2023.5.17) (代々木無限大記念日 (Live at 国立代々木競技場 第一体育館 2023.5.17); Yoyogi Infinity Anniversary (Live at Yoyogi National Stadium First Gymnasium 2023.5.17))	August 25, 2023	— (Note: "Yoyogi Infinite Celebration (Live at Yoyogi National Stadium 5/17/2023)" did not enter Oricon Weekly Albums Ranking, but peaked at number 2 on the component Oricon Weekly Digital Album Ranking.)	1,498		
9	Momoiro Christmas 2023 PLAYERS (Live at Saitama Super Arena 2023.12.24) (ももいろクリスマス2023 PLAYERS (Live at さいたまスーパーアリーナ 2023.12.24); "Momoiro Christmas 2023 PLAYERS (Live at Saitama Super Arena 2023.12.24)")	November 15, 2024	— (Note: "Momoiro Christmas 2023 PLAYERS (Live at Saitama Super Arena 2023.12.24)" did not enter Oricon Weekly Albums Ranking, but peaked at number 9 on the component Oricon Weekly Digital Album Ranking.)	519		

* During the week of Iriguchi no Nai Deguchi's official release, the album reached #2, with 69,125 copies.

=== Limited distribution albums ===
No.	Title	Release date
1	Momoclo All Stars 2012 (ももクロ★オールスターズ2012)	April 21, 2012

== Singles ==
No.	Title	Release date	Chart positions		Sales (Oricon)		Certification (RIAJ)	Album
No.	Title	Release date	Oricon Weekly Singles Chart	Billboard Japan Hot 100	First week	Total	Certification (RIAJ)	Album
Independent label
1	"Momoiro Punch" (ももいろパンチ, Momoiro Panchi; "Pink Punch")	August 5, 2009	23	—	4,167	13,655		Non-album singles
2	"Mirai e Susume!" (未来へススメ！; "Advance to the Future!")	November 11, 2009	11	—	15,292	23,278		Non-album singles
Major label
1	"Ikuze! Kaitō Shōjo" (行くぜっ！怪盗少女; "Let's Go! Thief Girls"): re-released in 2012 as "Ikuze! Kaitō Shōjo (Special Edition)" (行くぜっ！怪盗少女 ～Special Edition～)	May 5, 2010; September 26, 2012	3; 7	19; 29	22,537; 10,003	40,251; 28,864	Gold (PC distr.)	Battle and Romance
2	"Pinky Jones" (ピンキージョーンズ)	November 10, 2010	8	28	22,936	41,239		Battle and Romance
3	"Mirai Bowl / Chai Maxx" (ミライボウル／Chai Maxx, Mirai Bōru / Chai Makkusu; "Future Bowl / Chai Maxx")	March 9, 2011	3	12	25,070	47,422		Battle and Romance
4	"Z Densetsu: Owarinaki Kakumei" (Z伝説 ～終わりなき革命～; "Z Legend: Neverending Revolution")	July 6, 2011	5	22	13,193	22,077		Battle and Romance
5	"D' no Junjō" (D'の純情; "Dash for the Pure Heart")	July 6, 2011	6	59	12,969	19,045		Battle and Romance
6	"Rōdō Sanka" (労働讃歌; "Hymn to Labor")	November 23, 2011	7	13	39,976	68,654		5th Dimension
7	"Mōretsu Uchū Kōkyōkyoku. Dai Nana Gakushō "Mugen no Ai"" (猛烈宇宙交響曲・第七楽章「無限の愛」; "Fierce Space Symphony, 7th Movement «Infinite Love»")	March 7, 2012	5	2	39,858	88,760	Gold	5th Dimension
8	"Otome Sensō" (Z女戦争; "Girl'Z War")	June 27, 2012	3	3	67,596	116,425	Gold	5th Dimension
—	"Nippon Egao Hyakkei" (ニッポン笑顔百景; "Hundreds of Smiles Throughout Japan"): released under the alias of "Momoclo Tei Ichimon" (桃黒亭一門)	September 5, 2012	6	8	34,478	52,606		Non-album single
9	"Saraba, Itoshiki Kanashimitachi yo" (サラバ、愛しき悲しみたちよ; "Farewell, My Dear Sorrows")	November 21, 2012	2	1	73,745	134,168	Gold; Double Platinum (digital)	5th Dimension
10	"Gounn" (GOUNN)	November 6, 2013	2	2	77,581	96,296		Non-album single
11	"Naite mo Iin Da yo" (泣いてもいいんだよ; "It's Okay to Cry")	May 8, 2014	1	2	66,854	86,880		Amaranthus
12	"Moon Pride" (MOON PRIDE)	July 30, 2014	3	3	50,340	66,138		Hakkin no Yoake
13	"Yume no Ukiyo ni Saite Mi na" (夢の浮世に咲いてみな): collaboration single released under the alias of Momoiro Clover Z vs Kiss	January 28, 2015	2	2	58,228	74,046		Hakkin no Yoake
14	"Seishunfu" (青春賦)	March 11, 2015	4	4	64,310	79,320		Amaranthus
15	"Z no Chikai" (「Z」の誓い; "The Oath of Z")	April 29, 2015	4	5	48,626	58,339		Hakkin no Yoake
16	"The Golden History" (ザ・ゴールデン・ヒストリー)	September 7, 2016	2	4	51,883	61,584		Momo mo Jyuu, Bancha mo Debana
17	"Blast" (BLAST)	August 2, 2017	3	4	50,012	56,629		Momo mo Jyuu, Bancha mo Debana
18	"Xiao Yi Xiao" (笑一笑 〜シャオイーシャオ!〜)	April 11, 2018	4	9	22,034	31,160		Momo mo Jyuu, Bancha mo Debana
Digital 1	"Re:Story"	August 10, 2018	—N/a	72	—N/a	—N/a		Momoiro Clover Z
Digital 2	"Anta Tobashi Sugi!!" (あんた飛ばしすぎ!!)"	September 14, 2018	—N/a	21	—N/a	—N/a		Momoiro Clover Z
Digital 3	"Tengoku no Detarame" (天国のでたらめ)"	October 12, 2018	—N/a	28	—N/a	—N/a		Momoiro Clover Z
Digital 4	"GODSPEED"	November 16, 2018	—N/a	28	—N/a	—N/a		Momoiro Clover Z
Digital 5	"Sweet Wanderer"	December 21, 2018	—N/a	43	—N/a	—N/a		Momoiro Clover Z
Digital 6	"Nightmare Before Catharsis"	August 3, 2019	—N/a	94	—N/a	—N/a		Non-album singles
19	"Odoru Ponpokorin" (おどるポンポコリン)	August 28, 2019	22	—	5,986			Non-album singles
20	"Stay Gold"	November 27, 2019	4	23	19,096			Shukuten
Digital 7	"PLAY!"	November 29, 2020	— (Note: "PLAY!" peaked at number 35 on the component Oricon Weekly Digital Single Ranking.)	— (Note: "PLAY!" did not enter Billboard Hot 100, but peaked at number 38 on the component Billboard Download Songs.)	—N/a	—N/a		Shukuten
21	"Moon Color Chainon" (月色Chainon, Tsukiiro Chainon)	January 13, 2021	— (Note: "Tsukiiro Chainon" did not enter Oricon Weekly Single Ranking, but peaked at number 6 on the component Oricon Weekly Album Ranking.)	— (Note: "Moon Color Chainon" did not enter Billboard Hot 100, but peaked at number 7 on the component Billboard Hot Albums and at number 60 on the component Billboard Download Songs.)	8,943	11,814		Shukuten
Digital 8	"On Your Mark": collaboration single with Funky Kato	February 24, 2021	—N/a	—	—N/a	—N/a		Tanaka Masahiro
Digital 9	"Hoero 2021" (吼えろ 2021; "Howl 2021"): collaboration single with Funky Kato	July 2, 2021	—N/a	— (Note: "Hoero 2021" did not enter Billboard Hot 100, but peaked at number 61 on the component Billboard Download Songs.)	—N/a	—N/a		Non-album single
Digital 10	"BUTTOBI!"	December 24, 2021	— (Note: "BUTTOBI!" peaked at number 46 on the component Oricon Weekly Digital Single Ranking.)	— (Note: "BUTTOBI!" did not enter Billboard Hot 100, but peaked at number 51 on the component Billboard Download Songs.)	—N/a	—N/a		Shukuten
Digital 11	"HAND"	February 11, 2022	— (Note: "HAND" peaked at number 33 on the component Oricon Weekly Digital Single Ranking.)	— (Note: "HAND" did not enter Billboard Hot 100, but peaked at number 38 on the component Billboard Download Songs.)	—N/a	—N/a		Shukuten
Digital 12	"MYSTERION"	April 29, 2022	—N/a	— (Note: "MYSTERION" did not enter Billboard Hot 100, but peaked at number 73 on the component Billboard Download Songs.)	—N/a	—N/a		Shukuten
Digital 13	"Show Biz" (ショービズ)	May 11, 2022	—N/a	—	—N/a	—N/a		Shukuten
Digital 14	"Ichimi Doushin" (一味同心; "Same Mind")	August 19, 2022	— (Note: "Ichimi Doushin" peaked at number 24 on the component Oricon Weekly Digital Single Ranking.)	— (Note: "Ichimi Doushin" did not enter Billboard Hot 100, but peaked at number 32 on the component Billboard Download Songs.)	2,210	—N/a		Idola
Digital 15	"Majoram Therapie"	November 30, 2022	— (Note: "Majoram Therapie" peaked at number 23 on the component Oricon Weekly Digital Single Ranking.)	— (Note: "Majoram Therapie" did not enter Billboard Hot 100, but peaked at number 26 on the component Billboard Download Songs.)	3,068	—N/a		Idola
Digital 16	"L.O.V.E"	December 23, 2022	— (Note: "L.O.V.E" peaked at number 22 on the component Oricon Weekly Digital Single Ranking.)	— (Note: "L.O.V.E" did not enter Billboard Hot 100, but peaked at number 33 on the component Billboard Download Songs.)	3,160	—N/a		Idola
Digital 17	"Ichigo Ichie" (いちごいちえ; "Strawberry Ichie")	April 21, 2023	— (Note: "Ichigo Ichie" peaked at number 15 on the component Oricon Weekly Digital Single Ranking.)	— (Note: "Ichigo Ichie" did not enter Billboard Hot 100, but peaked at number 18 on the component Billboard Download Songs.)	4,119	—N/a		Idola
Digital 18	"Hikari Michi" (ヒカリミチ)	May 17, 2023	— (Note: "Hikari Michi" peaked at number 11 on the component Oricon Weekly Digital Single Ranking.)	— (Note: "Hikari Michi" did not enter Billboard Hot 100, but peaked at number 13 on the component Billboard Download Songs.)	4,028	—N/a		Non-album single
Digital 19	"Re:volution"	July 21, 2023	— (Note: "Re:volution" peaked at number 24 on the component Oricon Weekly Digital Single Ranking.)	— (Note: "Re:volution" did not enter Billboard Hot 100, but peaked at number 29 on the component Billboard Download Songs.)	2,227	—N/a		Idola
Digital 20	"MONONOFU NIPPON": collaboration single with Hotei	August 4, 2023	— (Note: "MONONOFU NIPPON" peaked at number 12 on the component Oricon Weekly Digital Single Ranking.)	— (Note: "MONONOFU NIPPON" did not enter Billboard Hot 100, but peaked at number 13 on the component Billboard Download Songs.)	4,443	—N/a		Idola
Digital 21	"Chikai Mirai" (誓い未来, "Promised Future")	October 27, 2023	— (Note: "Chikai Mirai" peaked at number 20 on the component Oricon Weekly Digital Single Ranking.)	— (Note: "Chikai Mirai" did not enter Billboard Hot 100, but peaked at number 26 on the component Billboard Download Songs.)	2,468	—N/a		Idola
Digital 22	"Matsuken Samba II ✖ Ikuze! Kaitō Shōjo - TeddyLoid ULTRA MASHUP ver.-" (マツケンサンバII×行くぜっ!怪盗少女 -TeddyLoid ULTRA MASHUP ver.-, "Matsuken Samba II ✖ Let’s go! Phantom Thief Girl -TeddyLoid ULTRA MASHUP ver.-"): collaboration single with Ken Matsudaira & TeddyLoid	December 24, 2023	—	— (Note: "Matsukensanba II ✖ iku ze ~tsu! Kaitō Shōjo - TeddyLoid Urutora MASHUP ver.-" did not enter Billboard Hot 100, but peaked at number 67 on the component Billboard Download Songs.)	—N/a	—N/a		Non-album single
Digital 23	"Brand New Day"	February 9, 2024	— (Note: "Brand New Day" peaked at number 23 on the component Oricon Weekly Digital Single Ranking.)	— (Note: "Brand New Day" did not enter Billboard Hot 100, but peaked at number 31 on the component Billboard Download Songs.)	2,291	—N/a		Idola
Digital 24	"Heroes"	April 12, 2024	—	— (Note: "Heroes" did not enter Billboard Hot 100, but peaked at number 39 on the component Billboard Download Songs.)	—N/a	—N/a		Idola
22	"Renacer Serenade" (レナセールセレナーデ)	June 28, 2024	9	— (Note: "Renacer Serenade" did not enter Billboard Hot 100, but peaked at number 13 on the component Billboard Download Songs.)	3,427	—N/a		TBA
Digital 25	"Yawaku Koishite 〜 Zutto Bokura de i Raremasu yō ni 〜" (やわく恋して ～ずっと僕らでいられますように～, Softly In Love - May We Always Be Us)	October 4, 2024	— (Note: "Yawaku Koishite 〜 Zutto Bokura de i Raremasu yō ni 〜" peaked at number 31 on the component Oricon Weekly Digital Single Ranking.)	— (Note: "Yawaku Koishite 〜 Zutto Bokura de i Raremasu yō ni 〜" did not enter Billboard Hot 100, but peaked at number 35 on the component Billboard Download Songs.)	—N/a	—N/a		TBA
Digital 26	"Acceleration"	April 30, 2025	— (Note: "Acceleration" peaked at number 44 on the component Oricon Weekly Digital Single Ranking.)	— (Note: "Acceleration" did not enter Billboard Hot 100, but peaked at number 45 on the component Billboard Download Songs.)	1,146	—N/a		TBA
23	"Event Horizon"	July 2, 2025	10	100	9,210	—N/a		TBA
Digital	"Kaishin no Ichigeki" (会心の一劇)	July 3, 2026	— (Note: "Kaishin no Ichigeki" peaked at number 23 on the component Oricon Weekly Digital Single Ranking.)	— (Note: "Kaishin no Ichigeki" did not enter Billboard Hot 100, but peaked at number 30 on the component Billboard Download Songs.)	—N/a	—N/a		TBA

=== Limited distribution singles ===
Title	Release date	Chart positions		Sales (Oricon)	
Title	Release date	Oricon Weekly Singles Chart	Billboard Japan Hot 100	First week	Total
"Kimi Yuki" (きみゆき; "Bound for You")	December 24, 2010	—	—		
"Akarin e Okuru Uta" (あかりんへ贈る歌; "A Song for Akarin")	June 11, 2011	—	—		
"Shiroi Kaze" (白い風; "White Wind")	December 25, 2011	—	—		
"Bokura no Century" (僕等のセンチュリー; "Our Century")	December 24, 2012	5	—	21,509	21,509
"Naichaisou Fuyu / Hagane no Ishi" (泣いちゃいそう冬／钢の意志; "Almost Cry, Winter / A Will of Steel")	December 23, 2013	2	—	36,774	45,840
"Hitotsubu no Egao de... / Chai Maxx ZERO" (一粒の笑顔で... ／ Chai Maxx ZERO; "With a Piece of Smile... / Chai Maxx ZERO")	December 24, 2014	7	—	23,892	38,376
"Koyoi, Live no Moto de" (今宵、ライブの下で; Tonight, Origin Live)	December 23, 2015	—	32		
"New Moon ni Koishite / Eien Dake ga Futari wo Kakeru" (ニュームーンに恋して/永遠だけが二人を架ける; "Fall in Love with the New Moon / Eternity Brings Two Together")	June 22, 2016	20	88		
"Tengoku no Namae / Henna Kitai Shicha Damedayo... ?" (天国の名前 / ヘンな期待しちゃ駄目だよ...？; "Heavenly name / / You can't expect strange things ...?")	December 13, 2017	—	—		

== Other charted songs ==
Title	Release date	Chart positions	Album
Title	Release date	Billboard Japan Hot 100	Album
"Neo Stargate" (Neo STARGATE)	March 13, 2013 (iTunes, Recochoku)	35	5th Dimension
"Kuroi Shūmatsu" (黒い週末; "Black Weekend")	November 21, 2012	97	Saraba, Itoshiki Kanashimitachi yo single
"Itsuka Kimi ga" (いつか君が; "What You Gave Some Time Ago")	November 6, 2013	10	Gounn single
"My dear fellow"	May 8, 2014	66	Naite mo Iin Da yo single
"Wasure rarenu myūjikku" (忘れられぬミュージック; "Unforgettable music") (with Yuzu, Back Number, Sakurako Ohara & Yumi Matsutoya)	July 15, 2014	23	Non-album single
"Moon Revenge"	July 30, 2014	83	Moon Pride single
"Gekkō" (月虹; "Moonbow")	July 30, 2014	84	Moon Pride single
"SAMURAI SON" (with Kiss)	January 28, 2015	67	Yume no Ukiyo ni Saite Mi na single
"Link Link"	March 11, 2015	86	Seishunfu single
"Yuku Haru Kuru Haru" (行く春来る春; "Spring coming spring")	March 11, 2015	94	Seishunfu single
"Hashire!" (走れ!; "Run!")	March 11, 2015	95	Seishunfu single
"HOLIDAY"	November 27, 2019	— (Note: "HOLIDAY" did not enter Billboard Hot 100, but peaked at number 84 on the component Billboard Download Songs.)	Stay Gold single
"More & More" (Cypress Ueno to Robert Yoshino feat. Momoiro Clover Z)	February 28, 2020	— (Note: "More & More" did not enter Billboard Hot 100, but peaked at number 73 on the component Billboard Download Songs.)	Saue to Royoshi - EP
"Tekketsu Gravity" (鉄血†Gravity; "Iron Blood Gravity") (Takanori Nishikawa feat. Momoiro Clover Z)	March 11, 2022	— (Note: "Tekketsu Gravity" did not enter Billboard Hot 100, but peaked at number 40 on the component Billboard Download Songs.)	SINGularity II - Hyperpaslia protoCOL -
"One Night Carnival"	March 30, 2022	— (Note: "One Night Carnival" did not enter Billboard Hot 100, but peaked at number 52 on the component Billboard Download Songs.)	All Night Carnival
"Cross Dimension" (with -D.R.B- (Division Leaders) from Hypnosis Mic: Division Rap Battle)	April 26, 2024	— (Note: "Cross Dimension" did not enter Billboard Hot 100, but peaked at number 84 on the component Billboard Download Songs.)	EVIL A LINE 10th Anniversary FES

== Videography ==
=== Live DVDs and Blu-rays ===
No.	Title	Release date	Chart positions		Total sales (Oricon)	
No.	Title	Release date	Oricon Weekly DVD Chart	Oricon Weekly BD Chart	DVD	BD
1	Momoiro Christmas in Nihon Seinenkan: Dappi (ももいろクリスマス in 日本青年館 〜脱皮:DAPPI〜; "Momoiro Christmas at Nihon Seinenkan ~Moulting~")	March 23, 2011 (DVD); June 5, 2013 (BD)	26	6	26,808	—
2	4.10 Nakano Sun Plaza Taikai Momoclo Haru no Ichidaiji: Mabushisa no Naka ni Kimi ga Ita (4.10中野サンプラザ大会 ももクロ春の一大事 〜眩しさの中に君がいた〜; "4.10 Live at Nakano Sun Plaza, Momoclo's Big Deal in Spring ~You Were There in Brightness~")	August 24, 2011 (DVD); June 5, 2013 (BD)	14	4	57,007	—
3	Summer Dive 2011 Gokuraku-mon kara Konnichiwa (サマーダイブ2011 極楽門からこんにちは; "Summer Dive 2011, Hello from Gokuraku-mon")	December 11, 2011 (DVD); June 5, 2013 (BD)	19	2	51,166	—
4	Momoclo Aki no 2 Dai Matsuri "Otoko Matsuri 2011" (ももクロ秋の2大祭り「男祭り2011」; "Momoclo's Two Autumn Grand Festivals "Men's Festival 2011"")	March 7, 2012 (DVD); June 5, 2013 (BD)	4	—	25,011	—
5	Momoclo Aki no 2 Dai Matsuri "Onna Matsuri 2011" (ももクロ秋の2大祭り「女祭り2011」; "Momoclo's Two Autumn Grand Festivals "Women's Festival 2011"")	March 7, 2012 (DVD); June 5, 2013 (BD)	3	—	29,065	—
6	Momoiro Christmas 2011 Saitama Super Arena Taikai (ももいろクリスマス2011 さいたまスーパーアリーナ大会; "Momoiro Christmas 2011, Live at Saitama Super Arena")	April 11, 2012	2	1	45,536	38,738
7	Momoclo Haru no Ichidaiji 2012: Momoclo All Stars (ももクロ春の一大事2012〜ももクロ☆オールスターズ〜; "Momoclo's Big Deal in Spring ~Momoclo All Stars~")	September 5, 2012	4	3	26,575	38,132
8	Momoclo Haru no Ichidaiji 2012: Miwataseba Dai Panorama Jigoku (ももクロ春の一大事2012〜見渡せば大パノラマ地獄〜; "Momoclo's Big Deal in Spring ~360° Panoramic Hell Picture~")	September 5, 2012	3	2	36,297	41,622
9	Momoclo Natsu no Bakasawagi Summer Dive 2012 Seibu Dome Taikai (ももクロ夏のバカ騒ぎ SUMMER DIVE 2012 西武ドーム大会; "Momoclo's Horseplay: Summer Dive 2012 at Seibu Dome")	December 24, 2012	9	3	31,701	39,640
10	Momoclo no Kodomo Matsuri 2012: Ii Ko no Minna Atsumarē (ももクロの子供祭り2012 ～良い子のみんな集まれーっ！～; "Children's Festival of Momoclo ~Fall in! All the Kids~")	January 23, 2013	8	3	5,830	12,172
11	Momoclo Aki no Ni Dai Matsuri "Otoko Matsuri 2012: Dynamism" (ももクロ秋の二大祭り「男祭り2012-Dynamism-」; "Momoclo's Two Autumn Grand Festivals "Men's Festival 2012 -Dynamism-"")	February 27, 2013	4	3	16,608	27,068
12	Momoclo Aki no Ni Dai Matsuri 2012 "Onna Matsuri 2012: Girl's Imagination" (ももクロ秋の二大祭り「女祭り2012-Girl's Imagination-」; "Momoclo's Two Autumn Grand Festivals "Women's Festival 2012 -Girl's Imagination-'")	February 27, 2013	3	2	16,809	27,073
13	Momoiro Christmas 2012 Saitama Super Arena Taikai 24nichi Kōen (ももいろクリスマス2012 〜さいたまスーパーアリーナ大会〜 24日公演; "Momoiro Christmas 2012, Live at Saitama Super Arena")	May 29, 2013	2	3	14,020	24,049
14	Momoiro Christmas 2012 Saitama Super Arena Taikai 25nichi Kōen (ももいろクリスマス2012 〜さいたまスーパーアリーナ大会〜 25日公演; "Momoiro Christmas 2012, Live at Saitama Super Arena")	May 29, 2013	1	2	14,050	24,108
15	Momoiro Clover Z Japan Tour 2013 "5th Dimension" (ももいろクローバーZ JAPAN TOUR 2013「5TH DIMENSION」; "Momoiro Clover Z JAPAN TOUR 2013 "5TH DIMENSION" ")	July 24, 2013	7	6		
16	Momoiro Clover Z Haru no Ichidaiji 2013 Seibu Dome Taikai 〜 Hoshi o Tsugu Momo vol.1 Peach for the Stars〜 (ももいろクローバーZ 春の一大事 2013 西武ドーム大会 〜星を継ぐもも vol.1 Peach for the Stars〜; "Serious affair 2013 Seibu Dome Tournament of Momoiro Clover Z spring 〜Peach for the Stars vol.1 Peach for the Stars〜")	September 25, 2013	6	3		
17	Momoiro Clover Z Haru no Ichidaiji 2013 Seibu Dome Taikai: Hoshi o Tsugu Momo Vol. 2 Peach for the Stars (ももいろクローバーZ 春の一大事 2013 西武ドーム大会 〜星を継ぐもも vol.2 Peach for the Stars〜; "Serious affair 2013 Seibu Dome Tournament of Momoiro Clover Z spring 〜Peach for the Stars vol.2 Peach for the Stars〜")	September 25, 2013	7	4		
18	Momoclo no Kodomo Matsuri 2013: Mamore! Minna no Tōbu Dōbutsu Kōen Tatakae! Momoiro Animal Z! (ももクロの子供祭り2013 〜守れ! みんなの東武動物公園 戦え! ももいろアニマルZ!〜; "Children festival 2013 Peach Black Protect ~! Animal and Z! ~ Pink! Fight Tobudobutsukoen everyone")	November 27, 2013	18	9		
19	Momoclo Natsu no Baka Sawagi World Summer Dive 2013.8.4 Nissan Stadium Taikai (ももクロ夏のバカ騒ぎ WORLD SUMMER DIVE 2013.8.4 日産スタジアム大会; "Stupid Commotion WORLD SUMMER DIVE 2013.8.4 Nissan Stadium Tournament of Black Peach Summer")	January 29, 2014	4	2		
20	Momoiro Clover Z JAPAN TOUR 2013 "GOUNN" (ももいろクローバーZ JAPAN TOUR 2013 「GOUNN」; "Momoiro Clover Z JAPAN TOUR 2013 "GOUNN"")	April 7, 2014	3	2		
21	Momoiro Christmas 2013 - Utsukushiki Gokkan No Sekai - (ももいろクリスマス2013 ～美しき極寒の世界～; "Momoiro Christmas 2013-The World of Beautiful Cold-")	June 25, 2014	3	3		
22	Momoclo Haru no Ichidaiji 2014 Kokuritsu Kyougijou Taikai ~NEVER ENDING ADVENTURE Yume no Mukou e~ Day 1/Day 2 LIVE Blu-ray BOX ももクロ春の一大事2014 国立競技場大会 ～NEVER ENDING ADVENTURE 夢の向こうへ～ Day1/Day2 LIVE Blu-ray BOX ( "Momoclo Spring Important 2014 National Stadium Meet -NEVER ENDING ADVENTURE Dream Beyond Dream-")	October 8, 2014	—	—		
23	Momoiro Yobanashi Dai Ichi Ya "Hakushu" (ももいろ夜ばなし第一夜「白秋」; "Momoiro Night Without 1st Night "White Autumn"")	November 26, 2014	13	3		
24	Momoiro Yobanashi Dai Ichi Ya "Gento" (ももいろ夜ばなし第二夜「玄冬」; "Momoiro Night Without 2nd Night "Xu Winter")	November 26, 2014	12	2		
25	Momoclo Natsu no Baka Sawagi 2014 Nissan Studium Taikai ~Tojinsai~ Day 1 (「ももクロ夏のバカ騒ぎ2014 日産スタジアム大会～桃神祭～」Day1; ""Momoclo Summer's Stupid Fuss 2014 Nissan Stadium Tournament-Momojin Festival-" Day 1")	March 9, 2015	6	2		
26	Momoclo Natsu no Baka Sawagi 2014 Nissan Studium Taikai ~Tojinsai~ Day 2 (「ももクロ夏のバカ騒ぎ2014 日産スタジアム大会～桃神祭～」Day2; ""Momoclo Summer's Stupid Fuss 2014 Nissan Stadium Tournament-Momojin Festival-" Day 2")	March 9, 2015	7	3		
27	Momoiro Christmas 2014 Saitama Super Arena Taikai ~Shining Snow Story~ Day 1 (ももいろクリスマス2014 さいたまスーパーアリーナ大会 ～Shining Snow Story～ Day1; "Momoiro Christmas 2014 Saitama Super Arena Tournament ~ Shining Snow Story ~ Day 1")	March 9, 2015	2	3		
28	Momoiro Christmas 2014 Saitama Super Arena Taikai ~Shining Snow Story~ Day 2 (ももいろクリスマス2014 さいたまスーパーアリーナ大会 ～Shining Snow Story～ Day2; "Momoiro Christmas 2014 Saitama Super Arena Tournament ~ Shining Snow Story ~ Day 2")	March 9, 2015	1	2		
29	Onna Matsuri 2014 ~Ristorante da MCZ~ (ももいろクローバーZ「女祭り2014 ～Ristorante da MCZ～」; "Momoiro Clover Z "Festival 2014 ~ Ristorante da MCZ ~")	September 2, 2015	3	4		
30	Momoiro Clover Z Tojinsai 2015 Ecopa Stadium Taikai ~Odekosama Gorairin~ (ももいろクローバーZ 桃神祭2015 エコパスタジアム大会 ～御額様ご来臨～; "Momoiro Clover Z Momogami Festival 2015 Ecopa Stadium Tournament")	November 25, 2015	2	3		
31	Momoiro Clover Z Tojinsai 2015 Ecopa Stadium Taikai ~Enshuu Osawagi~ (ももいろクローバーZ 桃神祭2015 エコパスタジアム大会 ～遠州大騒儀～; "Momoiro Clover Z Momojin Festival 2015 Ecopa Stadium Tournament")	November 25, 2015	5	3		
32	Momoclo Otoko Matsuri 2015 in Dazaifu (ももクロ男祭り2015 in 太宰府; "Momoclo Matsuri 2015 in Dazaifu ")	May 23, 2016	3	3		
33	Momoiro Christmas 2015 ~Beautiful Survivors~ (ももいろクリスマス2015 ～Beautiful Survivors～; "Momoiro Christmas 2015-Beautiful Survivors-")	June 29, 2016	3	3		
34	MOMOIRO CLOVER Z DOME TREK 2016 DAY1"AMARANTHUS"	November 16, 2016	4	2		
35	MOMOIRO CLOVER Z DOME TREK 2016 DAY2 "Hakkin no Yoake" (MOMOIRO CLOVER Z DOME TREK 2016 DAY2"白金の夜明け"; "MOMOIRO CLOVER Z DOME TREK 2016 DAY2 "The Dawn of Platinum"")	November 16, 2016	5	3		
36	Momo Shinsai 2016 ~Onigashima~ (ももいろクローバーZ 桃神祭 2016～鬼ヶ島～; "Momoiro Clover Z Momokan Festival 2016-Onigashima-")	February 8, 2017	4	2		
37	Momoiro Christmas 2016 ~Mafuyu no Sun Sun Summertime~ (ももいろクリスマス 2016 ～真冬のサンサンサマータイム～; "Momoiro Christmas 2016 ~ Midsummer Sun Summer Time ~")	April 26, 2017	8	4		
38	Momoclo Haru no Ichidaiji 2017 in Fujimi-shi (ももクロ春の一大事2017 in 富士見市; "Momoclo Spring Most Important 2017 in Fujimi-shi")	October 25, 2017	6	5		
39	Momoclo Natsu no Baka Sawagi 2017 -FIVE THE COLOR Road to 2020- Ajinomoto Studium Taikai (ももクロ夏のバカ騒ぎ2017-FIVE THE COLOR Road to 2020-味の素スタジアム大会; "Momoclo Summer Stupidity 2017-FIVE THE COLOR Road to 2020-Ajinomoto Stadium Tournament")	January 17, 2018	5	3		
40	Momoiro Christmas 2017 ~Kanzen Muketsu no Electric Wonderland~ (ももいろクリスマス 2017 ～完全無欠のElectric Wonderland～; "Momoiro Christmas 2017-Completeless Electric Wonderland-")	August 1, 2018	5	3		
41	MTV Unplugged:Momoiro Clover Z	October 24, 2018	18	6		
42	Momoiro Clover Z 10th Anniversary The Diamond Four -in Tokyo Dome- (ももいろクローバーZ 10th Anniversary The Diamond Four -in 桃響導夢-; "Momoiro Clover Z 10th Anniversary The Diamond Four -in Tokyo Dome-")	December 19, 2018	11	4		
43	MomocloMania2018-Road to 2020-	February 20, 2019	7	4		
44	Momoiro Christmas 2018 DIAMOND PHILHARMONY -The Real Deal- (ももいろクリスマス 2018 DIAMOND PHILHARMONY -The Real Deal-; "Momoiro Christmas 2018 DIAMOND PHILHARMONY -The Real Deal-")	July 31, 2019	8	3		
45	5th ALBUM "MOMOIRO CLOVER Z" SHOW At Tokyo Kinema Club LIVE (5th ALBUM『MOMOIRO CLOVER Z』SHOW at 東京キネマ倶楽部 LIVE; "5th Album "Momoiro Clover Z" Show At Tokyo Kinema Club Live")	December 25, 2019	23	11		
46	MomocloMania2019 -Road To 2020- Shijo Saidai no Pre Kaikaishiki LIVE (MomocloMania2019-Road to 2020-史上最大のプレ開会式 LIVE; "MomocloMania2019 -Road To 2020- The largest pre-opening ceremony in history LIVE")	February 26, 2020	11	8		
47	Momoiro Christmas 2019 ~ Fuyuzora no Mirror Ball ~ LIVE (ももいろクリスマス2019 ～冬空のミラーボール～ LIVE; "Momoiro Christmas 2019 -Winter Sky Mirror Ball- LIVE")	July 15, 2020	5	3		
48	Momoclo Natsu no Baka Sawagi 2020 Haishin-saki Kara Kon'nichiwa LIVE (ももクロ夏のバカ騒ぎ2020 配信先からこんにちは LIVE; "Momoclo Hello from Foolish Commotion 2020 the Delivery Destination of the Summer LIVE")	December 23, 2020	18	5		
49	PLAY! LIVE	April 14, 2021	7	3		
50	Momoiro Christmas 2021 ~Saitama Super Arena Taikai~ LIVE (ももいろクリスマス2021～さいたまスーパーアリーナ大会～ LIVE; "Momoiro Christmas 2021 ~Saitama Super Arena Tournament~ LIVE")	August 24, 2022	8	6		
51	MOMOIRO CLOVER Z 6th ALBUM TOUR "Shukuten" LIVE (MOMOIRO CLOVER Z 6th ALBUM TOUR"祝典"LIVE; "MOMOIRO CLOVER Z 6th ALBUM TOUR "Celebration" LIVE")	September 19, 2022	2	3		
52	Momoclo Natsu no Baka Sawagi 2022 -MOMOFEST- LIVE (ももクロ夏のバカ騒ぎ2022 -MOMOFEST- LIVE; "Momoclo Summer Stupid Uproar 2022 -MOMOFEST- LIVE")	December 21, 2022	12	17		
53	Momoiro Christmas 2022 LOVE LIVE (ももいろクリスマス2022 LOVE LIVE; "Momoiro Christmas 2022 LOVE LIVE")	August 2, 2023	6	3		
54	Yoyogi Bugendai Kinenbi Momoiro Clover Z 15th Anniversary LIVE (代々木無限大記念日 ももいろクローバーＺ 15th Anniversary LIVE; "Yoyogi Infinity Anniversary Momoiro Clover Z 15th Anniversary LIVE")	October 4, 2023	4	2		
55	Momoiro Christmas 2023 PLAYERS (ももいろクリスマス2023 PLAYERS; "Momoiro Christmas 2023 PLAYERS")	December 18, 2024	18	8		
56	Momoclo Haru no Ichidaiji 2024 in Kameoka-shi ~ Egaonochikara Tsunageru Omoi ~ (ももクロ春の一大事2024 in 亀岡市 ～笑顔のチカラ つなげるオモイ～; "Momoclo Spring Event 2024 in Kameoka City ~The Power of Smiles, Connecting Thoughts~")	March 19, 2025	13	5		

=== Music video collections ===
No.	Title	Release date	Chart positions		Total sales (Oricon)	
No.	Title	Release date	Oricon Weekly DVD Chart	Oricon Weekly BD Chart	DVD	BD
1	Momoiro Clover Z MUSIC VIDEO CLIPS (ももいろクローバーZ MUSIC VIDEO CLIPS; "Momoiro Clover Z MUSIC VIDEO CLIPS")	October 12, 2016	6	4		
2	Momoiro Clover Z MUSIC VIDEO CLIPS II -ANGEL EYES Gentei- (ももいろクローバーZ MUSIC VIDEO CLIPS II -ANGEL EYES限定-; "Momoiro Clover Z MUSIC VIDEO CLIPS II -ANGEL EYES Limited-"): (Only members of the fan club ANGEL EYES)	September 2023	—	—		

=== Documentaries and television programs ===
No.	Title	Release date	Chart positions		Total sales (Oricon)	
No.	Title	Release date	Oricon Weekly DVD Chart	Oricon Weekly BD Chart	DVD	BD
1	momodra momo+dra (ももドラ momo+dra; "momodra momo+dra")	April 11, 2012	61	5		
2	Momoclo Shiki Kengaku Guide Momoken!! (ももクロ式見学ガイド もも見!!; "Momoclo Tour Guide Momo See!")	February 8, 2013	—	2		
3	Momoclo Dan × BOT (ももクロ団×BOT; "Momoclo Dan × BOT")	April 12, 2013	70	6		
4	Tenshi to Jump (天使とジャンプ; "Angel and Jump")	May 26, 2014	40	2		
5	Hajimete no Momoclo - Kanzenhan - (はじめてのももクロ -完全版-; "Hajimete no Momoclo -Complete Edition-")	September 14, 2016	75	5		
6	Musée du Momoclo (Musée duももクロ; "Momoclo's Museum")	June 30, 2021	—	74		
5	Momoiro Clover Z 〜 Idol no Mukō-gawa 〜〈Tokubetsu Jōei-ban〉 (ももいろクローバーZ ～アイドルの向こう側～〈特別上映版〉; "Momoiro Clover Z ~the future of the IDOL~ (Special Screening)")	June 2, 2023	—	8		

=== Musical ===
No.	Title	Release date
1	Do You Wana Dance? (ドゥ・ユ・ワナ・ダンス?; "Do You Wana Dance?")	March 27, 2019
2	CHANGE THE FUTURE！~Change the Future~ (CHANGE THE FUTURE！～未来を変えろ～): (Only members of the fan club ANGEL EYES)	March 14, 2025
