= 5th Dimension (album) =

- Regular Edition cover

Studio album by Momoiro Clover Z
- Released: 10 April 2013 (Japan, CD); 4 August 2013 (Japan, LP)
- Genres: J-pop; pop
- Label: Starchild Records

Momoiro Clover Z chronology
| Battle and Romance (2011) | 5th Dimension (2013) | Iriguchi no Nai Deguchi (2013) |

Singles from 5th Dimension
- 1. "Rōdō Sanka" Released: 23 November 2011; 2. "Mōretsu Uchū Kōkyōkyoku Dai 7 Gakushō "Mugen no Ai"" Released: 7 March 2012; 3. "Otome Sensō" Released: 27 June 2012; 4. "Saraba, Itoshiki Kanashimitachi yo" Released: 21 November 2012

Music videos
- Momorio Clover Z "Neo Stargate" on YouTube
- Momorio Clover Z "Birth 0 Birth" on YouTube

Professional ratings
Review scores
| Source | Rating |
|---|---|
| Rolling Stone Japan | 4/5 stars |

5th Dimension (5TH DIMENSION, Fifusu Dimenshon) is the second studio album by the Japanese girl group Momoiro Clover Z. It was released in Japan on 10 April 2013.

== Release details ==
On 13 March 2013, the album's lead song "Neo Stargate" was released on iTunes and Recochoku for digital download. On the same day, the video for the song was uploaded to the Stardust Promotion official YouTube channel.

The album was released in 3 versions: Regular Edition and Limited Editions A and B. The regular edition is CD-only, the limited edition A includes a CD with a live performance, and the limited edition B includes a DVD with 2 music videos.

5th Dimension was said by members to be a concept album that you should listen to in the track order.

The album sold 102,855 copies in its first day and debuted on top of the Oricon daily chart, with Momoiro Clover's first album Battle and Romance at number two.

== Track listing ==
CD
| No. | Title | Length |
|---|---|---|
| 1. | "Neo Stargate" (Neo STARGATE) | 8:19 |
| 2. | "Kasō Dystopia" (仮想ディストピア Kasō Disutopia "Virtual Dystopia") | 4:09 |
| 3. | "Mōretsu Uchū Kōkyōkyoku Dai 7 Gakushō "Mugen no Ai"" (猛烈宇宙交響曲・第七楽章「無限の愛」 "Fierce Space Symphony, Seventh Movement "Infinite Love"") | 5:12 |
| 4. | "5 The Power" (5 The POWER) | 4:19 |
| 5. | "Rōdō Sanka" (労働讃歌 "Hymn to Labor") | 4:38 |
| 6. | "Get Down!" (ゲッダーン! Geddān!) | 3:34 |
| 7. | "Otome Sensō" (Z女戦争 "Girl'Z War") | 6:57 |
| 8. | "Tsuki to Gingami Hikōsen" (月と銀紙飛行船 "The Moon and a Silver-paper Airship") | 5:16 |
| 9. | "Birth 0 Birth" (BIRTH Ø BIRTH Bāsu Ō Bāsu) | 5:03 |
| 10. | "Jōkyu Monogatari -Carpe Diem-" (上球物語 -Carpe diem- "Story of Going to the Earth -Carpe Diem-") | 4:04 |
| 11. | "Soratobu! Ozashiki Ressha" (宙飛ぶ!お座敷列車 "Flying in the Sky! Tatami-room Train") | 4:29 |
| 12. | "Saraba, Itoshiki Kanashimitachi yo" (サラバ、愛しき悲しみたちよ "Farewell, My Dear Sorrows") | 5:01 |
| 13. | "Hai to Diamond" (灰とダイヤモンド Hai to Daiyamondo "Ashes and Diamonds") | 6:52 |

Limited Edition A CD2: Live CD containing the first part of the Momoiro Yobanashi Dai-ichi Ya "Hakushū" concert, held at Zepp Tokyo on November 17, 2012
| No. | Title | Artist(s) | Length |
|---|---|---|---|
| 1. | "Cosmos" (秋桜 Kosumosu) | Ayaka Sasaki |
| 2. | "Hatsukoi" (初恋) | Kanako Momota |
| 3. | "Namidame no Alice" (涙目のアリス Namidame no Arisu) | Shiori Tamai |
| 4. | "Arigatō no Present" (ありがとうのプレゼント Arigatō no Purezento) | Momoka Ariyasu |
| 5. | "Tsugaru Hantō Tappizaki" (津軽半島竜飛崎) | Reni Takagi |
| 6. | "Erimomisaki" (襟裳岬) | Reni Takagi |
| 7. | "Datte Ārinnandamōn" (だって あーりんなんだもーん☆) | Ayaka Sasaki |
| 8. | "Taiyō to Ekubo" (太陽とえくぼ) | Kanako Momota |
| 9. | "Shōjo Ningyō" (少女人形) | Shiori Tamai |
| 10. | "Nagori Yuki" (なごり雪) | Momoka Ariyasu with Minami Kōsetsu (南こうせつ) |
| 11. | "Kandagawa" (神田川) | Momoiro Clover Z with Minami Kōsetsu |
| 12. | "Ano Subarashī Ai o Mō Ichi Do" (あの素晴しい愛をもう一度) | Momoiro Clover Z with Minami Kōsetsu |

Limited Edition B DVD
| No. | Title | Length |
|---|---|---|
| 1. | "Neo Stargate (music video)" (Neo STARGATE (MUSIC VIDEO)) |
| 2. | "Birth 0 Birth (music video)" (BIRTH Ø BIRTH (MUSIC VIDEO)) |

== Charts ==
| Chart (2013) | Peak position | | |
|---|---|---|---|
| Chart (2013) | Peak position | Oricon Daily Albums Chart | 1 |
| Oricon Weekly Albums Chart | 1 | | |
| Oricon Monthly Albums Chart | 1 | | |
