= Z Densetsu (Owarinaki Kakumei) =

2011 song by Momoiro Clover Z

Single by Momoiro Clover Z

from the album Battle and Romance
- Released: July 6, 2011 (Japan)
- Genre: J-pop
- Label: StarChild
- Songwriter: Kenichi Maeyamada.

Momoiro Clover Z singles chronology
"Mirai Bowl / Chai Maxx" (2011)	"Z Densetsu (Owarinaki Kakumei)" (2011)	"D' no Junjō" (2011)

Music video
- "Z Densetsu (Owarinaki Kakumei)" on YouTube

"Z Densetsu (Owarinaki Kakumei)" (Z伝説 ～終わりなき革命～; "Z Legend: Neverending Revolution") is the 4th single by the Japanese female idol group Momoiro Clover Z, released in Japan on July 6, 2011.

== Release ==
The single was released in only one edition and had just one song on it. It was released on the same day with Momoiro Clover's 6th single "D' no Junjō" and preceded the release of the band's first album Battle and Romance. The two singles became first the group released under the name of Momoiro Clover Z.

"Z Densetsu (Owarinaki Kakumei)" is a tie-up song for a commercial for Tokyo Joypolis.

An updated version of the song, called the "ZZ Version" and performed by the four remaining members following Momoka Ariyasu's departure, was included in the group's 2019 self-titled album.

== Music ==
The song was produced by Kenichi Maeyamada who had written for Momoiro Clover such trademark songs as "Ikuze! Kaitō Shōjo" and "Coco Natsu". The shout "Zed!" was performed by the "big brother of the anime music genre" Ichiro Mizuki. The male voice summoning the members is Fumihiko Tachiki. When the announcer shouts out "Blue!" (the color of Akari Hayami who left the group in April), the girls freeze in shock and the song stops for a split second.

== Cover art and music video ==
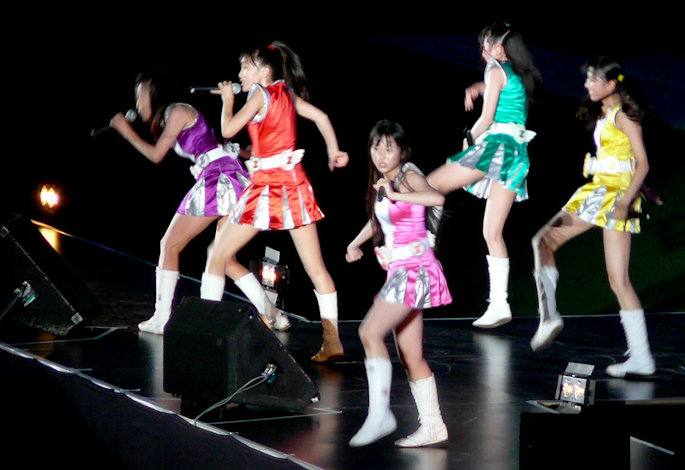
Momoiro Clover Z performs in the "Z Densetsu (Owarinaki Kakumei)" costumes at the Jingu Gaien Fireworks Festival. August 6, 2011.

The music video was released on the DVD that came with the limited edition A of the album Battle and Romance that came out three weeks later, on July 27.

On the cover and in the music video all members are wearing costumes in the style of "sentai heroes", main protagonists of Japanese television series in a genre called "sentai". The sentai genre (the word sentai means literally "squadron") evolves around a team of costumed superheroes fighting villains and includes such popular television shows and franchises as Kyōryū Sentai Zyuranger (remade into Power Rangers for the US), Kamen Rider, Ultraman, Metal Hero. The music video is also reminiscent of sentai films. In the video, the girls use transformation belts to become helmeted fighters looking like sentai warriors, and the Weekend Heroines squadron fights fully armed with a song and a dance. The protagonists of the superhero genre usually have transformation belts (henshin beruto) or some other transformation items (like rings, swords, etc.), which they use to transform into superheroes in armored suits. Momoiro Clover Z transformation belts are clover style.

=== Transformation in sentai ===
The transformation between an ordinary person and a superhero is an important feature of the plots of Japanese sentai (superhero) adventures. The protagonists seem to be ordinary people, but they transform from their civilian selves into their superhero selves at the push of a button, sometimes simultaneously saying a particular word or phrase. Kamen Rider Accel from the Kamen Rider W series uses his henshin beruto (transformation belt or morphing belt) to transform into a masked crusader. His belt gives a protagonist special powers. For example, a Kamen Rider can jump ten times his height when using his henshin beruto. Copies of the Kamen Rider series' belts are one of the most popular Christmas gifts for Japanese boys.

== Promotion ==
By June 3, the music video for "Z Legend (Owarinaki Kakumei)" was released on the Stardust Digital's official YouTube channel and on Nico Nico Douga.

When the song was performed live for the first time, the performance was described as shocking and attracted a lot of attention.

To promote the release of both 4th and 5th singles, Momoiro Clover Z held a series of live events and appearances, one of the notable ones being a concert on July 9, 2012 at the theme park Mega Web 1F in front of the audience of 1,800 people. At the event, Momoiro Clover performed in the costumes used in the music video for "Z Densetsu (Owarinaki Kakumei)".

== Reception ==
The single debuted at the 5th place in the Oricon Daily Singles Chart, while the simultaneously released 5th single "D' no Junjō" at the 6th.

== Track listing ==
All songs written, composed, and arranged by Kenichi Maeyamada.

CD
No.	Title	Length
1.	"Z Densetsu (Owarinaki Kakumei)" (Z伝説 ～終わりなき革命～, "Z Legend: Neverending Revolution")	5:08

== Chart performance ==
Chart (2011)	Peak position
Oricon Daily Singles Chart	1
Oricon Weekly Singles Chart	5
Billboard Japan Hot 100	22
Billboard Japan Hot Top Airplay	73
Billboard Japan Hot Singles Sales	7

== Notes ==
a: The group Momoiro Clover Z is nicknamed "Weekend Heroines" for performing on weekends because its members are at school on weekdays.
