= Rōdō Sanka =

- Cover for the Regular Edition

Single by Momoiro Clover Z

from the album 5th Dimension
- B-side: Santa-san; Bionic Cherry
- Released: November 23, 2011 (Japan)
- Genre: J-pop
- Label: Starchild
- Songwriters: I PArton, K Otsuki

Momoiro Clover Z singles chronology
"D' no Junjō" (2011)	"Rōdō Sanka" (2011)	"Mōretsu Uchū Kōkyōkyoku Dai 7 Gakushō 'Mugen no Ai'" (2012)

Music videos
- Rōdō Sanka on YouTube
- Santa-san on YouTube

"Rōdō Sanka" (労働讃歌; "Hymn to Labor") is the 6th single by the Japanese female idol group Momoiro Clover Z, released in Japan on November 23, 2011.

== Release ==
The single was released in three versions: the Limited Editions A and B and the Regular Edition. The limited editions came with a DVD featuring a music video, but contained only two different songs on the CD in comparison to three on the regular CD-only edition.

== Songs and music videos ==
=== Title track ===
The title track praises the nobility of labor. The lyrics repeat "Hatarakō, hatarakō" (働こう; "Let's work!"). The lyrics were written by Kenji Otsuki, the music and arrangement were by Ian Parton from the UK band The Go! Team.

The music video for the song features the five group members working in an office in so-called "energy-saving suits" (省エネスーツ) and on a construction site in workwear. The "energy-saving suits" are half-sleeve tropical salaryman suits, worn with short-sleeved open-necked shirts. This kind of suit was heavily promoted by the Japanese government in the 1970s as a means to save energy on air conditioning at the time of the oil crisis.

=== B-sides ===
The B-side "Santa-san" was produced by Kenichi Maeyamada, who had written for Momoiro Clover such trademark songs as "Ikuze! Kaitō Shōjo", "Coco Natsu", and "Z Densetsu: Owarinaki Kakumei".

The Regular Edition also features a third song titled "Bionic Cherry", which was a theme song for the movie Salvage Mice.

== Promotion ==
The promotional campaign for the single included a competition titled "Momoclo Painting Contest". The group announced that it needed a different promotional poster for each of 47 prefectures and invited people to submit their works.

The title track "Rodo Sanka" was premiered live on the rooftop of the From Chūbū building in Tachikawa, western Tokyo. The group wore "energy-saving suits". The concert was held on November 3 and included a total of 13 songs plus 3 for an encore.

== Reception ==
The CD single debuted in the 4th place of the Oricon Weekly Singles Chart. The limited edition B was the highest selling of the three in that first week of sales. In 2012, fans voted "Santa-san" to number one on the Momoiro Clover Z Request Countdown, aired on Space Shower TV on August 31, 2012.

== Track listing ==
=== Limited Editions A, B ===
CD
No.	Title	Length
1.	"Rōdō Sanka" (労働讃歌)
2.	"Santa-san" (サンタさん)
3.	"Rōdō Sanka" (off vocal ver.)
4.	"Santa-san" (off vocal ver.)

Limited Edition A DVD
No.	Title	Length
1.	"Rōdō Sanka" (Music Video)

Limited Edition B DVD
No.	Title	Length
1.	"Santa-san" (Music Video)

=== Regular Edition ===
CD
No.	Title	Length
1.	"Rōdō Sanka" (労働讃歌)
2.	"Santa-san" (サンタさん)
3.	"Bionic Cherry" (BIONIC CHERRY)
4.	"Rōdō Sanka" (off vocal ver.)
5.	"Santa-san" (off vocal ver.)
6.	"Bionic Cherry" (off vocal ver.)

== Chart performance ==
Chart (2012)	Peak position
Oricon Daily Singles Chart	1
Oricon Weekly Singles Chart	4
Oricon Yearly Singles Chart	158
Billboard Japan Hot 100	13
