= Battle and Romance =

- Regular Edition cover

Studio album by Momoiro Clover Z
- Released: 27 July 2011
- Genres: J-pop; pop
- Length: 58:55 (Regular Edition)
- Label: Starchild Records

Momoiro Clover Z chronology
Battle and Romance (2011)	5th Dimension (2013)

Singles from Battle and Romance
- 1. "Ikuze! Kaitō Shōjo" Released: 5 May 2010; 2. "Pinky Jones" Released: 10 October 2010; 3. "Mirai Bowl / Chai Maxx" Released: 9 March 2011; 4. "Z Densetsu (Owarinaki Kakumei)" Released: 6 July 2011; 5. "D’ no Junjō" Released: 6 July 2011

Music videos
- "Z Densetsu (Owarinaki Kakumei)" on YouTube
- "D’ no Junjō" on YouTube

Battle and Romance (バトル アンド ロマンス, Batoru ando Romansu) is the debut studio album by the Japanese girl group Momoiro Clover Z. It was released in Japan on 27 July 2011.

== Release details ==
The album was released in three versions: Regular Edition and Limited Editions A and B. The regular edition was CD-only, the limited edition A included a second CD with six solo songs, and the limited edition B included a DVD with two music videos. The album is also available on two LPs.

== Reception ==
The album debuted at weekly number 3 in the Oricon chart.

The album won Grand Prix at the 4th CD Shop Awards, making Momoiro Clover Z the first idols to win it. The CD Shop Awards ceremony is held annually; the winners are chosen by votes from Japanese record store clerks.

When the two limited editions (A and B) of Battle and Romance were re-released on 10 April 2013, the album updated its peak position to 2nd, selling approximately 38,000 copies in the re-release week.

== Track listing ==
CD
No.	Title	Length
1.	"Z Densetsu: Owarinaki Kakumei" (Ｚ伝説～終わりなき革命～)
2.	"Contradiction" (CONTRADICTION)
3.	"Mirai Bowl" (ミライボウル)
4.	"Wani to Shampoo" (ワニとシャンプー, "Crocodile and Shampoo")
5.	"Pinky Jones" (ピンキージョーンズ)
6.	"Kimi no Ato" (キミノアト, "Trace of You")
7.	"D’ no Junjō" (D’の純情)
8.	"Ame no Tajikarao" (天手力男)
9.	"Orange Note" (オレンジノート)
10.	"Ikuze! Kaitō Shōjo" (行くぜっ!怪盗少女)
11.	"Stardust Serenade" (スターダストセレナーデ)
12.	"Kono Uta" (コノウタ, "This Song")
13.	"Momoclo no Nippon Banzai!" (bonus track, ももクロのニッポン万歳!)

Limited Edition A CD
No.	Title	Artist	Length
1.	"Taiyō to Ekubo" (太陽とえくぼ)	Kanako Momota
2.	"Fall into Me" (fall into me)	Akari Hayami
3.	"Ai Desu ka?" (…愛ですか?, "…Is It Love?")	Shiori Tamai
4.	"Datte Ārin Nan Da Mōn" (だって あーりんなんだもーん☆)	Ayaka Sasaki
5.	"Arigatō no Present" (ありがとうのプレゼント, "Thank You Present")	Momoka Ariyasu
6.	"Koi wa Abare Oni Daiko" (恋は暴れ鬼太鼓, "Love is a Rampaging Oni Daiko")	Reni Takagi

Limited Edition B DVD
No.	Title	Length
1.	"Z Densetsu (Owarinaki Kakumei) (music video)" (Ｚ伝説～終わりなき革命～ (Music Video))
2.	"D’ no Junjō (music video)" (D’の純情 (Music Video))

== Charts ==
Chart (2011)	Peak position
Oricon Daily Albums Chart	2
Oricon Weekly Albums Chart	3
Oricon Monthly Albums Chart	21
Billboard Japan Top Albums	7

Chart (2013)	Peak position
Oricon Daily Albums Chart	2
Oricon Weekly Albums Chart	2
Oricon Monthly Albums Chart	6

== Awards ==
=== 4th CD Shop Awards ===
Year	Nominee / work	Award	Result
2011	Battle and Romance	Grand Prix	Won
