= Mōretsu Uchū Kōkyōkyoku Dai 7 Gakushō "Mugen no Ai" =

"Mōretsu Uchū Kōkyōkyoku Dai 7 Gakushō 'Mugen no Ai'"
- Regular Edition cover

Single by Momoiro Clover Z

from the album 5th Dimension
- Released: March 7, 2012 (Japan)
- Genre: J-pop, symphonic rock
- Label: StarChild
- Songwriter: Kenichi Maeyamada

Momoiro Clover Z singles chronology
"Rōdō Sanka" (2011)	"Mōretsu Uchū Kōkyōkyoku Dai 7 Gakushō 'Mugen no Ai'" (2012)	"Otome Sensō" (2012)

Music video
- "Mōretsu Uchū Kōkyōkyoku Dai 7 Gakushō 'Mugen no Ai'" on YouTube

Alternative cover
- Limited Edition cover

"Mōretsu Uchū Kōkyōkyoku Dai 7 Gakushō 'Mugen no Ai'" (猛烈宇宙交響曲・第七楽章「無限の愛」, Mōretsu Uchū Kōkyōkyoku Dai Nana Gakushō 'Mugen no Ai'; "Bodacious Space Symphony's Movement VII 'Infinite Love'") is the 7th single by the Japanese female idol group Momoiro Clover Z, released in Japan on March 7, 2012. Ex-Megadeth guitarist Marty Friedman is featured on the title track. The official remix by the Dutch electronic music trio Noisia was released on August 25, 2014.

== Release ==
The single was released in two versions: Limited Edition and Regular Edition. The limited edition came with a DVD featuring the music video for the title track, but contained only two different songs on the CD in comparison to three on the regular CD-only edition.

== Music ==
"Mōretsu Uchū Kōkyōkyoku Dai 7 Gakushō 'Mugen no Ai'" and "Lost Child" are, respectively, the opening and the ending themes of the anime series Bodacious Space Pirates. Director of the anime Tatsuo Satō described "Mōretsu Uchū Kōkyōkyoku Dai 7 Gakushō 'Mugen no Ai'" as "a song, very descriptive of Moretsu. I am absolutely amazed". The song was written, composed and arranged by Kenichi Maeyamada; Marty Friedman (ex-Megadeth) provided guitar.

The regular edition's B-side "DNA Kyōshikyoku" is an advertising song for two products by the Momoya food company, Kizamishōga and Kizamininniku. Momoclo members themselves appeared in the commercials.

== Cover art and music video ==
On the covers and in the music video Momoclo members are wearing pirate costumes. The costumes were based on rough drawings by Yoshiyuki Sadamoto, best known for the character design of such anime series as Neon Genesis Evangelion and FLCL.

With the song being Universe-themed, its music video represents a Momoclo-style space opera.

== Promotion ==
Approximately a month prior to the release, Momoiro Clover Z announced a tour in support of the single. The group was to give five concerts overall in four different prefectures, starting from February 25 in Tokyo. All tickets would come with the regular edition of the CD, included in the price.

To commemorate the release, on February 18, 2012, Momoiro Clover Z held a surprise live concert in front of Sankaku (Triangle) Park in Shinsaibashi, Osaka. A crowd of 3,000 fans gathered in the park to see the announced premiere of the music video for "Mōretsu Uchū Kōkyōkyoku Dai 7 Gakushō 'Mugen no Ai'" on the big screen. After the video ended, the screen lifted to reveal the group standing behind it. Although puzzled at their identity at first, the audience greeted the girls with applause. Momoclo, down to four members because of Momoka Ariyasu's flu, performed five songs. The event was also broadcast live on the group's official Ustream channel.

== Reception ==
The CD single debuted at 5th place in the Oricon Weekly Singles Chart, selling 39,858 copies in that first week. In the Billboard Japan Hot 100 chart, the title track debuted in 2nd place.

== Track listing ==
=== Limited Edition ===
CD
No.	Title	Length
1.	"Mōretsu Uchū Kōkyōkyoku Dai 7 Gakushō 'Mugen no Ai'" (猛烈宇宙交響曲・第七楽章「無限の愛」, "Bodacious Space Symphony's Movement VII 'Infinite Love'")
2.	"Lost Child" (LOST CHILD)
3.	"Mōretsu Uchū Kōkyōkyoku Dai 7 Gakushō 'Mugen no Ai'" (off vocal ver.)
4.	"Lost Child" (off vocal ver.)

DVD
No.	Title	Length
1.	"Mōretsu Uchū Kōkyōkyoku Dai 7 Gakushō 'Mugen no Ai'" (Music Video)

=== Regular Edition ===
CD
No.	Title	Length
1.	"Mōretsu Uchū Kōkyōkyoku Dai 7 Gakushō 'Mugen no Ai'"
2.	"Lost Child"
3.	"DNA Kyōshikyoku" (DNA狂詩曲 Dī Enu Ē Kyōshikyoku, "DNA Rhapsody")
4.	"Mōretsu Uchū Kōkyōkyoku Dai 7 Gakushō 'Mugen no Ai'" (off vocal ver.)
5.	"Lost Child" (off vocal ver.)
6.	"DNA Kyōshikyoku" (off vocal ver.)

== Chart performance ==
Chart (2012)	Peak position
Oricon Daily Singles Chart	2
Oricon Weekly Singles Chart	5
Oricon Monthly Singles Chart	13
Billboard Japan Hot 100	2
Billboard Japan Hot Top Airplay	63
Billboard Japan Hot Singles Sales	3
Billboard Japan Adult Contemporary Airplay	19
Billboard Japan Hot Animation	1
