= Otome Sensō =

- Regular Edition 1 cover

Single by Momoiro Clover Z

from the album 5th Dimension
- Released: June 27, 2012 (Japan)
- Genre: J-pop
- Length: 6:55
- Label: StarChild

Momoiro Clover Z singles chronology
"Mōretsu Uchū Kōkyōkyoku. Dai Nana Gakushō «Mugen no Ai»" (2012)	"Otome Sensō" (2012)	"Saraba, Itoshiki Kanashimitachi yo" (2012)

Momoclo Tei Ichimon singles chronology
"Nippon Egao Hyakkei" (2012)

Music videos
- Otome Sensō on YouTube
- Push on YouTube
- Mite Mite Kotchichi (choreography video) on YouTube

Alternative cover
- Regular Edition 2 (Pokémon Edition) cover

Alternative cover
- Limited Edition A cover

Alternative cover
- Limited Edition B cover

"Otome Sensō" (Z女戦争; "Girl's War") is the 8th single by the Japanese female idol group Momoiro Clover Z, released in Japan on June 27, 2012. It became Momoiro Clover's first single to be certified Gold by the Recording Industry Association of Japan for shipments of 100,000 copies.

== Release ==
The single was released in four versions: Limited Edition A, Limited Edition B, Regular Edition 1, and Regular Edition 2 (Pokémon Edition). Each version has a different cover. The limited edition A came with a DVD featuring the music video for the title track, the limited edition B with the music video for the B-side "Push", but the limited editions contained less songs on the CD in comparison to the regular CD-only edition.

== Music ==
At over 7 minutes long in the music video version, the song is unusually long for a single. It was written by Etsuko Yakushimaru a.k.a. Tika α, who had composed for such artists as Tomohisa Yamashita and SMAP. When the title and the cover art were made public, she hinted at what the song was like by describing its outlook of the world as "When this battle is over, we are all going to a chorus contest." The song is a mosaic of Japanese-oldies-style melodies and contemporary music. The song can be interpreted as Momoiro Clover's (whose popularity is rising) proclamation of war for the top of the Japanese idol music scene, as a declaration of war for an ultimate idol showdown.

The B-side "Push" is a cheer anthem. It was used as an advertising song for an ice cream product called "Sō" by Lotte.

"Mite Mite Kotchitchi" is included on the regular editions only. It is an ending theme for the TV anime series Pokémon: Best Wishes! and for the Pokémon theatrical film Meloetta no Kirakira Recital.

== Cover art ==
There is a secret hidden on the cover of the Limited Edition B. If you look closely at Reni Takagi who is lying on the grass, there's an Sō ice cream treat nearby. On the edition's back cover, the girls form the ice cream's name, the character "爽" (Sō)

== Music video ==
The "Otome Sensō" music video switches between Momoiro Clover in school uniforms praying that their bittersweet youth won't be destroyed and Momoiro Clover in combat armor fighting affectionately. The combat costumes were drafted by Sushio, an animator who worked on such films as Neon Genesis Evangelion, Gurren Lagann, theatrical versions of One Piece.

The band's costumes were designed by Japanese animator Sushio of Studio Trigger.

== Critical response ==
Yūki Sugioka from Hotexpress gives the single a highly positive review. She notes that the title track, written by Etsuko Yakushimaru, is completely different from the band's previous work. In the song, she counts roughly six or seven distinct parts, one of which, in her words, "is a melancholic ennui melody that will definitely put a smile on the face of a Sōtaisei Riron fan." (Sōtaisei Riron is the band where Etsuko Yakushimaru is the lead singer.) Overall, she defines the title track as a "mix of high-calorie youth anthems", and the B-side "Push" as a "fast-paced inspiring fight song". She adds that what is most important is that the whole single, every track on it, really makes you adore Momoiro Clover Z.

== Reception ==
The CD single debuted at the 3rd place in the Oricon Weekly Singles Chart, selling 67,596 copies in that first week. It tied for Momoiro Clover's highest position with "Ikuze! Kaitō Shōjo" and "Mirai Bowl / Chai Maxx", but could not do better because of new songs by KAT-TUN and Girls' Generation that were released on the same day. In the Billboard Japan Hot 100 chart, the title track debuted also in the 3rd place.

== Track listing ==
=== Limited Edition A, Limited Edition B ===
CD
No.	Title	Length
1.	"Otome Sensō" (Z女戦争, "Girl's War")	6:55
2.	"Push" (PUSH)	4:34
3.	"Otome Sensō" (off vocal ver.)
4.	"Push" (off vocal ver.)

Limited Edition A DVD
No.	Title	Length
1.	"Otome Sensō" (Music Video)

Limited Edition B DVD
No.	Title	Length
1.	"Push" (Music Video)

=== Regular Edition 1, Regular Edition 2 (Pokémon Edition) ===
CD
No.	Title	Length
1.	"Otome Sensō" (Z女戦争, "MaidenZ War")	6:55
2.	"Push" (PUSH)	4:34
3.	"Mite Mite Kotchitchi" (みてみて☆こっちっち)	3:52
4.	"Otome Sensō" (off vocal ver.)
5.	"Push" (off vocal ver.)
6.	"Mite Mite Kotchitchi" (off vocal ver.)

== Chart performance ==
Chart (2012)	Peak position
Oricon Daily Singles Chart	3
Oricon Weekly Singles Chart	3
Oricon Monthly Singles Chart	9
Oricon Yearly Singles Chart	76
Billboard Japan Hot 100	3
Billboard Japan Hot 100 Airplay	12
Billboard Japan Hot Singles Sales	3
Billboard Japan Adult Contemporary Airplay	39
RIAJ Digital Track Chart	14

=== "Mite Mite Kotchitchi" ===
Chart (2012)	Peak position
Billboard Japan Hot Animation	2
RIAJ Digital Track Chart	20
