= Bodacious Space Pirates =

Japanese light novel series

- Miniskirt Space Pirates; Bodacious Space Pirates
- Cover for the first light novel volume, featuring the protagonist, Marika Kato

モーレツ宇宙海賊 / ミニスカ宇宙海賊 (Mōretsu Pairētsu / Minisuka Pairētsu)
- Genre: Adventure, science fiction, space opera
- Light novel

Miniskirt Space Pirates
- Written by: Yūichi Sasamoto
- Illustrated by: Noriyuki Matsumoto
- Published by: Asahi Shimbun (former); Kadokawa
- Imprint: Asahi Shimbun Shuppan (former)
- Original run: October 21, 2008 – August 20, 2014
- Volumes: 12
- Anime television series
- Directed by: Tatsuo Sato
- Produced by: Kenjiro Kawato; Rei Shimai
- Written by: Michiko Itou
- Music by: Elements Garden: Noriyasu Agematsu; Hitoshi Fujima; Junpei Fujita
- Studio: Satelight
- Licensed by: AUS: Hanabee; NA: Sentai Filmworks; UK: MVM Films
- Original network: Tokyo MX, MBS, tvk
- English network: US: Anime Network
- Original run: January 8, 2012 – June 30, 2012
- Episodes: 26
- Manga
- Written by: Yuichi Sasamoto
- Illustrated by: Hiro Tōge
- Published by: Asahi Shimbun
- Magazine: Nico Nico Asahi Comic Fantasy
- Original run: June 2, 2012 – December 3, 2012
- Volumes: 1
- Anime film

Miniskirt Space Pirates: Abyss of Hyperspace
- Directed by: Tatsuo Sato
- Written by: Tatsuo Sato
- Music by: Elements Garden: Noriyasu Agematsu; Evan Call; Hitoshi Fujima; Junpei Fujita
- Studio: Satelight
- Licensed by: NA: Sentai Filmworks
- Released: February 22, 2014
- Runtime: 93 minutes
- Manga

Abyss of Hyperspace
- Written by: Tatsuo Sato
- Illustrated by: Chibimaru
- Published by: Media Factory
- English publisher: NA: Seven Seas Entertainment
- Magazine: Monthly Comic Alive
- Original run: December 27, 2013 – September 27, 2014
- Volumes: 2
- Light novel

Super Miniskirt Space Pirates
- Written by: Yūichi Sasamoto
- Illustrated by: Noriyuki Matsumoto
- Published by: Kadokawa
- Original run: July 25, 2019 – present
- Volumes: 2

Miniskirt Space Pirates (ミニスカ宇宙海賊(パイレーツ), Minisuka Pairētsu) is a Japanese light novel series about space pirates written by Yūichi Sasamoto and illustrated by Noriyuki Matsumoto, published since October 2008. An anime television series adaptation produced by Satelight, under the title Bodacious Space Pirates (モーレツ宇宙海賊(パイレーツ), Mōretsu Pairētsu; "Fierce Pirates"), aired in Japan from January to June 2012. A film adaptation was released in Japanese theaters in February 2014. A web manga adaptation launched in June 2012. Seven Seas Entertainment licensed the manga series for a printed release in North America in August 2015.

Miniskirt Space Pirates was initially just a working title for the series, which Sasamoto had been asked to write for the debut lineup of Asahi Shimbun's Asahi Novels label. However, he was unable to come up with another name to replace it. Sasamoto stated that he stuck with the title because it easily conveyed what the story was about. But when the series was selected for an anime adaptation, Sasamoto was advised that they couldn't use "miniskirt" so he provided "mōretsu" instead.

== Plot ==
In the far future where space travel and colonization have become the norm, humanity has expanded its living space to the far reaches of the known galaxy. One hundred years before the beginning of the series, several colonies, eager to gain their independence, rebelled against their masters in the Stellar Alliance Colony Federation. The government of one of the newly colonized planets, Sea of the Morningstar (うみのあけほし) in the Tau Ceti system, recruited Space Pirates to bolster its fighting forces, legalizing their actions by issuing them letters of marque.

In the midst of this conflict, a Galactic Empire arose and absorbed both the Stellar Alliance and the border worlds, but allowed the colonies to run on an independent government. Despite peace having been achieved, the Space Pirates remain respected figures in Imperial society, even though their activities are now reduced to more legal jobs (like errand running and staging raids for the entertainment of space travellers) in which their knowledge of the system's wild space proves particularly useful. At the time the series begins, their cessation of illegal activities is gradually causing them to pass into local legend.

Marika Kato is a high school girl living a rather ordinary life as a member of the space yacht club with a part-time job at the high-class retro Lamp Café. One day, Marika learns of her recently deceased father, Gonzaemon, who is revealed to have been a Space Pirate. In order for her father's ship, the Bentenmaru (弁天丸), to continue legal operation, Marika, Gonzaemon's direct descendant, is chosen to become the ship's new captain, thus beginning her life as a Space Pirate.

== Characters ==
=== Main characters ===
Marika Kato (加藤 茉莉香, Katō Marika)
Voiced by: Mikako Komatsu (Japanese); Luci Christian (English)
A girl who is a member of her school's space yacht club and has a part time job as a waitress in a cafe. She learns one day about her recently deceased father, Gonzaemon Kato, who was a Space Pirate. As Gonzaemon's only descendant, she is chosen to become the new captain of the Bentenmaru. After joining her parents' former crew, she starts dividing her time between her studies, her part-time job and her duties aboard the Bentenmaru. It does not take long for her crewmates to confirm that Marika has what it takes to live up to her father's legacy.
Chiaki Kurihara (チアキ・クリハラ)
Voiced by: Kana Hanazawa (Japanese); Caitlynn French (English)
A mysterious girl who transfers into Marika's school after she learns of her heritage, observing her while she decides about becoming a space pirate or not. Just like Marika, Chiaki is heir to another pirate ship, the Barbaroosa. Despite claiming she does not like when Marika gets too friendly with her, she truly cares for her and always lends a hand when needed. The only breach in her cold facade is her passion for ice parfaits, on which she partakes regularly whenever she visits the Lamp Café.

=== The Bentenmaru ===
Misa Grandwood (ミーサ・グランドウッド, Mīsa Gurandouddo)
Voiced by: Shizuka Itō (Japanese); Carli Mosier (English)
The Bentenmaru's beautiful medic and unofficial first mate, and one of the crew's veterans from Gonzaemon Kato's leadership. At Hakuho Academy, she acts as the school's doctor.
Kane McDougal (ケイン・マクドゥガル, Kein Makudugaru)
Voiced by: Masaya Matsukaze (Japanese); Chris Patton (English)
The Bentenmaru's helmsman. At Hakuho Academy, he serves as adviser of the Space Yacht Club and homeroom teacher in Marika's class.
Hyakume (百眼)
Voiced by: Keiji Fujiwara (Japanese); Kalob Martinez (English)
The Bentenmaru's radar and sensor specialist who likes to assemble model ships in his free time.
Coorie (クーリエ, Kūrie)
Voiced by: Yui Horie (Japanese); Hilary Haag (English)
The Bentenmaru's electronic warfare specialist. She usually appears as a stereotypical nerd, constantly clad in her pajamas and thick coke bottle glasses, and eating snacks at her workstation. She is actually very attractive, but doesn't want anyone to notice, only using her looks as a last resort to get information from men.
Schnitzer (シュニッツァー, Shunittsā)
Voiced by: Kenta Miyake (Japanese); George Manley (English)
The Bentenmaru's tactical officer. He is a cyborg and was a friend of Ririka during her space pirate years.
San-Daime (三代目)
Voiced by: Yoshitsugu Matsuoka (Japanese); Greg Ayres (English)
The Bentenmaru's engineer. While not busy, he enjoys collecting teddy bears.
Luca (ルカ, Ruka)
Voiced by: Kaoru Mizuhara (Japanese); Monica Rial (English)
The Bentenmaru's navigator and psychic whose cryptic warnings usually anger some of her crewmates.

=== Hakuoh Academy ===
Mami Endo (遠藤 マミ, Endō Mami)
Voiced by: Chiaki Omigawa (Japanese); Brittney Karbowski (English)
Marika's closest school friend and a co-worker at the Lamp Café. Additionally, she is a member of the academy's knitting club, and has taken up the challenge of creating new "cute" uniforms for Marika's pirating job.
Jenny Dolittle (ジェニー・ドリトル, Jenī Doritoru)
Voiced by: Rina Satō (Japanese); Shannon Emerick (English)
The President of the Space Yacht club and the heir of a major space shipping conglomerate. Following the first half of the series, she graduates and passes her position to Lynn. Later on, she runs away from an arranged marriage with the help of Marika's crew and Lynn, who is revealed to be her lover.
Lynn Lambretta (リン・ランブレッタ, Rin Ranburetta)
Voiced by: Yōko Hikasa (Japanese); Emily Neves (English)
(Rin Lambretta in the English dub) The vice-president of the Space Yacht club. A troublemaker and skilled hacker, Lynn is a lesbian and Jenny's lover. After Jenny graduated, she took over her position as president. It was also revealed that she hacked the Nebula Cup Tournament 6 years ago and thus caused Hakuoh Academy to be suspended from participating in the race for 5 years.
Talvikki Launo (タルヴィッキ・ラウノ, Taruvikki Rauno)
Voiced by: Shizuka Itō (Japanese); Genevieve Simmons (English)
A member of the Space Yacht club. Graduated after Marika begins her second year at high school.
Flora Chapie (フローラ・チャピー, Furōra Chapī)
Voiced by: Chiaki Omigawa (Japanese); Margaret McDonald (English)
A member of the Space Yacht club. Graduated after Marika begins her second year at high school.
Mylene Certon (ミレーネ・セルトン, Mirēne Seruton)
Voiced by: Saori Hayami (Japanese); Elizabeth Bannor (English)
A member of the Space Yacht club who wears sunglasses. Graduated after Marika begins her second year at high school.
Izumi Yunomoto (イズミ・ユノモト, Izumi Yunomoto)
Voiced by: Maaya Uchida (Japanese); Tiffany Grant (English)
A member of the Space Yacht club.
Asta Alhanko (アスタ・アルハンコ, Asuta Aruhanko)
Voiced by: Kiyono Yasuno (Japanese); Tiffany Terrell (English)
A member of the Space Yacht club.
Syoko Kobayashimaru (小林丸 翔子, Kobayashimaru Shōko)
Voiced by: Kanako Nomura (Japanese); Allison Sumrall (English)
A member of the Space Yacht club.
April Lambert (エイプリル・ランバート, Eipuriru Ranbāto)
Voiced by: Yuiko Tatsumi (Japanese); Hayley Adams (TV series), Karlii Hoch (Movie) (English)
A member of the Space Yacht club.
Belinda Percy (ベリンダ・パーシー, Berinda Pāshī)
Voiced by: Suzuko Mimori (Japanese); Maggie Flecknoe (English)
A member of the Space Yacht club.
Maki Harada (原田 真希, Harada Maki)
Voiced by: Chinatsu Akasaki (Japanese); Kris Carr (English)
A member of the Space Yacht club.
Sasha Staple (サーシャ・ステイプル, Sāsha Suteipuru)
Voiced by: Natsumi Takamori (Japanese); Tiffany Terrell (English)
A member of the Space Yacht club.
Lilly Bell (リリィ・ベル, Riri Beru)
Voiced by: Satomi Satō (Japanese); Cynthia Martinez (English)
A member of the Space Yacht club.
Ursula Abramov (ウルスラ・アブラモフ, Urusura Aburamofu)
Voiced by: Asuka Nishi (Japanese); Emily Neves (English)
A member of the Space Yacht club.
Ai Hoshimiya (アイ・ホシミヤ, Ai Hoshimiya)
Voiced by: Ai Kayano (Japanese); Margaret McDonald (English)
A member of the Space Yacht club who joins after Marika's second year at high school and has a natural talent as a pilot and helmsman. When the Bentenmaru's crew is hospitalized, she temporarily takes Kane's place as the ship's helmsman. She is also able to predict the wind currents in atmospheric flying and read the constellations for navigation.
Natalia Grennorth (ナタリア・グレンノース, Nataria Gurennōsu)
Voiced by: Mariya Ise (Japanese); Elizabeth Bannor (Ep. 1-13), Ashley Mrozek-Thurow (Ep. 14-26), Juliet Simmons (Movie) (English)
A member of the Space Yacht club who joins after Marika's second year at high school.
Yayoi Yoshitomi (ヤヨイ・ヨシトミ, Yayoi Yoshitomi)
Voiced by: Yoshino Nanjō (Japanese); Allison Sumrall (English)
A member of the Space Yacht club who joins after Marika's second year at highschool. Her expertise on old fashion engines was a great help when Marika and the Yacht Club used the Bentenmaru for a pirate job.

=== Serenity Kingdom Star System ===
Gruier Serenity (グリューエル・セレニティ, Guryūeru Sereniti)
Voiced by: Haruka Tomatsu (Japanese); Monica Rial (English)
The Seventh Princess of the Serenity Royal Family of the Serenity Star System who knew Marika's father, Gonzaemon. Gruier hires the Bentenmaru to help her find the Golden Ghost Ship, a first-generation colony transport ship whose descendants became the firsts settlers of Serenity. In truth, Gruier wants to search the ship to find the Artificial Womb room, a lab that genetically creates and births children for the Serenity Royal family. Due to political turmoil in the Serenity Kingdom, Gruier wishes to destroy the Artificial Womb so that no new heirs will be born, believing the Royal family's time has come to an end and Serenity should embrace republicanism to revive its former glory. However, this leads to conflict with her younger sister Grunhilde, who has other plans for the Artificial Womb. It is only after Marika's intervention that she stops the rivalry between the two sisters and also saves the newest and last Serenity Royal to be born from the womb. She later attends Hakuho Academy and joins the Space Yacht Club before Marika's second year starts. Despite being a princess, she is always seen hanging out with Marika, much to Grunhilde's concern, and helps Marika whenever she is in trouble.
Grunhilde Serenity (グリュンヒルデ・セレニティ, Guryunhirude Sereniti)
Voiced by: Hisako Kanemoto (Japanese); Kalin Coates (English)
The Eighth Princess of the Serenity Royal Family. She and her sister Gruier were in a conflict to find the legendary golden ghost ship as she wishes to use the Artificial Womb to birth a new heir that will end the Serenity Kingdom's political turmoil and revive its former glory. However, Marika manages to defuse the situation between the two sisters and repair their relationship. She later attends Hakuho Academy and joins the Space Yacht Club with her sister. At first she does not like her sister being too close to Marika as she is a pirate, but later she understand why her sister adores Marika and subsequently comes out of her own shell as well.
Yotof Sif Sideux (ヨートフ・シフ・シドー)
Voiced by: Atsushi Ono (Japanese); David Wald (English)
Grand Chamberlain of the Privy Council of the Serenity Star System.
Catherine
Head of the Serenity Royal Family bodyguards.

=== Space Pirates ===
Kenjo Kurihara (ケンジョー・クリハラ, Kenjō Kurihara)
Voiced by: Yasunori Matsumoto (Japanese); Rob Mungle (English)
Captain of the pirate ship Barbaroosa, and father of Chiaki. He is on friendly terms with the Bentenmaru's crew and its captain.
Gonzaemon Kato (加藤 ゴンザエモン, Katō Gonzaemon) / Ironbeard (芳郎, Tetsu no Hige)
Voiced by: Rikiya Koyama (Japanese); Mike Yager (English)
The captain of the Imperial Pirate Ship Parabellum. Wears a mask and the gold skull of a recognized Imperial Pirate. In the last episode, he is revealed to be Gonzaemon Kato, Marika's father and Ririka's husband (although he keeps his actual survival secret from his daughter) and the narrator of the series.
Ririka Kato (加藤 梨理香, Katō Ririka)
Voiced by: Yuko Kaida (Japanese); Shelley Calene-Black (English)
Marika's mother and Gonzaemon's wife, who was once a space pirate herself known as "Blaster Ririka". Marika rarely calls her "Mother", instead calling her by her given name; however, Marika does call her "Mother" when she's serious. After leaving the Bentenmaru, Ririka started working as an Air Traffic Controller. Sometime after Marika becomes the captain of the Bentenmaru, she joins the crew of the Parabellum, under Captain Ironbeard.
Shane McDougal (シェイン・マクドゥガル, Shein Makudugaru)
Voiced by: Masaya Matsukaze (Japanese); Chris Patton (English)
Kane's younger twin brother and helmsman of the Parabellum.
Quartz Christie (クォーツ・クリスティア, Kwōtsu Kurisutia)
Voiced by: Yūko Sanpei (Japanese); Genevieve Simmons (English)
Captain and pilot of the Grand Cross, a giant, next-generation experimental battleship. An Imperial Pirate, she battle tested the Grand Cross by destroying the space pirates of the frontier worlds, believing they no longer act like the pirates of old. It is only after the frontier pirates united under Marika's leadership that she is defeated. Quartz is hinted to be royalty due to the way Ironbeard talks to her and her relationship with the Empress of the Galactic Empire.

=== Others ===
Show (ショウ, Shō)
Voiced by: Hiroki Yasumoto (Japanese); Andrew Love (English)
The flamboyant head of the Harold Lloyd Insurance Union, and successor of the previous president, Harold, with whom the crew of the Bentenmaru - Ririka in particular - had often come to blows over professional issues. He acts both as an insurance agent for high-risk clients (such as pirates and cruise ships) and as an agent for the pirates, negotiating and setting up their "jobs" (such as flashy pirate attacks on cruise ships for the entertainment of the passengers).
Oyaji
Voiced by: Takashi Matsuyama (Japanese); Christopher Ayres (English)
A chef who runs an inconspicuous restaurant known only to pirates (and ex-pirates), and it is revealed that he is the son of the Legendary Chef who long ago united all pirates to fight in the War of Independence.
The Legendary Chef
Voiced by: Takashi Matsuyama (Japanese); Greg Ayres (English)
The head chef of the Pirate's Nest. Inheriting his father's title, he runs the Pirate's Nest, a neutral space station where space pirates meet and eat together, whether they be frontier or imperial space pirates.
Robert Doolittle (ロバート・ドリトル, Robāto Doritoru)
Voiced by: Eizou Tsuda (Japanese); David Wald (English)
Uncle of Jenny Doolittle and chairman of the Hugh and Dolittle interstellar transport company. Fearing Jenny rather than his son will inherit the company, he arranges a marriage between Jenny and a politician to prevent it. However, he is thwarted by Marika and her friends when they expose Jenny's fiance as the leader of an anti-government revolutionist group and Robert himself secretly selling illegal weapons to politicians and rebels.

== Media ==
=== Light novels ===
The first novel of Miniskirt Space Pirates, written by Yūichi Sasamoto and illustrated by Noriyuki Matsumoto, was published by Asahi Shimbun on October 21, 2008, and the twelfth and last on August 20, 2014. The series was transferred to Kadokawa in 2018, who began reprinting it in the same year. A new series, Super Miniskirt Space Pirates, began publishing on July 25, 2019.

==== Volumes ====
Miniskirt Space Pirates novel series
No.	Title	Original release date	Kadokawa release date
1	—	October 21, 2008; 9784022739018	December 25, 2018; 9784040650678
2	Ōgon no Yūreisen (黄金の幽霊船)	April 21, 2009; 9784022739131	December 25, 2018; 9784040650685
3	Kosupure Minarai Kaizoku (コスプレ見習海賊)	November 20, 2009; 9784022739261	January 25, 2019; 9784040650692
4	Shikkoku no Nanpasen (漆黒の難破船)	May 20, 2010; 9784022739421	January 25, 2019; 9784040650708
5	Shirogane no Kyūnansen (白銀の救難船)	November 19, 2010; 9784022739568	February 25, 2019; 9784040650715
6	Shinku no Kaizokusen (真紅の海賊船)	March 18, 2011; 9784022739629	February 25, 2019; 9784040650722
7	Sōhaku no Dokurohoshi (蒼白の髑髏星)	November 25, 2011; 9784022739780	March 25, 2019; 9784040650739
8	Shikon no Senmajo (紫紺の戦魔女)	April 20, 2012; 9784022739858	March 25, 2019; 9784040650746
9	Muhō no Gomenjō (無法の御免状)	November 20, 2012; 9784022739964	April 25, 2019; 9784040650753
10	Niseki no Hakuchōgo (二隻の白鳥号)	June 20, 2013; 9784022760036	April 25, 2019; 9784040650760
11	Mōretsu Jikan Kaizoku (モーレツ時間海賊)	February 7, 2014; 9784022760104	May 25, 2019; 9784040650777
12	Mōretsu Shūsen Kōsaku (モーレツ終戦工作)	August 20, 2014; 9784022760135	June 25, 2019; 9784040650784

Super Miniskirt Space Pirates novel series
No.	Title	Release date	ISBN
1	Kaizoku Shikankōhosei (海賊士官候補生)	July 25, 2019	9784040650791
2	Mōretsu Denshi Kantaisen (モーレツ電子艦隊戦)	June 25, 2021	9784040648774

=== Anime ===
The anime adaptation, under the title Bodacious Space Pirates (モーレツ宇宙海賊, Mōretsu Pairētsu) is produced by Satelight and directed by Tatsuo Satō. The anime aired on Tokyo MX, MBS and TVK between January 8, 2012, and June 30, 2012, and was also simulcast by Crunchyroll. The anime has been licensed in North America by Sentai Filmworks and released to digital outlets in February. The series was released on Blu-ray Disc and DVD with an English dub on January 8, 2013 (Vol 1) and March 5, 2013 (Vol 2). MVM Films have licensed the series in the United Kingdom and will release the series in two DVD boxsets from February 4, 2012. The opening theme song is "Mōretsu Uchū Kōkyōkyoku Dai Nana Gakushō «Mugen no Ai»" (猛烈宇宙交響曲・第七楽章「無限の愛」; "Bodacious Space Symphony's Movement VII «Infinite Love») by idol group Momoiro Clover Z and ex-Megadeth guitarist Marty Friedman. The ending theme song is "Lost Child" by Momoiro Clover Z.

==== Film ====
A film adaptation was announced following the end of the series. The film, titled Bodacious Space Pirates: Abyss of Hyperspace (モーレツ宇宙海賊 ABYSS OF HYPERSPACE -亜空の深淵-, Mōretsu uchū kaizoku - Akū no shin'en), was released on February 22, 2014, with Satō returning as director and screenwriter.

=== Manga ===
A manga adaptation illustrated by Hiro Tōge began serialization in Asahi Shimbun's Nico Nico Asahi Comic Fantasy web manga publication on Nico Nico Seiga from June 2, 2012. A manga adaptation of the film illustrated by Chibimaru began serialization in Media Factory's Monthly Comic Alive from February 2014. The manga was licensed in English by Seven Seas Entertainment, who released the first and second volumes in August and November 2015, respectively.

== Reception ==
The anime version won the 2013 Seiun Award for Best Dramatic Presentation.

Reviewing the television anime adaptation for Otaku USA, Clarissa Graffeo recommended it, describing the series as "just plain fun... colorful and exciting, with a good balance between character drama, comedy, and tense privateer missions."

Erica Friedman of Yuricon praised Jenny and Lynn, two supporting characters in the anime, as not only strong female characters, but as a "perfect Yuri couple," and noting a moment between these characters in the second part of the anime.

Regarding the film adaptation, Nicole MacLean of THEM Anime Reviews pointed out: "It basically does what it sets out to do, that is, giving fans of the series a bit to drool over." Stig Høgset appreciated the "pirate shenanigans and space nerdery" present in the film but voiced displeasure in its failure to continue the story from the television series.
