= Ikuze! Kaitō Shōjo =

- Regular Edition cover

Single by Momoiro Clover

from the album Battle and Romance
- B-side: "Hashire!"
- Released: May 5, 2010; September 26, 2012 (re-release)
- Genre: J-pop
- Label: Universal J

Momoiro Clover singles chronology
"Mirai e Susume!" (2009)	"Ikuze! Kaitō Shōjo" (2010)	"Pinky Jones" (2010)

2012 singles chronology
"Otome Sensō" (2012)	""Ikuze! Kaitō Shōjo (Special Edition)"" (2012)	"Saraba, Itoshiki Kanashimitachi yo" (2012)

Music video
- "Ikuze! Kaitō Shōjo" on YouTube

"Ikuze! Kaitō Shōjo" (行くぜっ!怪盗少女; lit. "Let's Go! Thief Girls") is the debut major-label single by the Japanese girl group Momoiro Clover, released in Japan through Universal J on May 5, 2010. It reached third place on the Oricon charts. The dance routine for the song incorporates intense acrobatics, including a "shrimp jump", cartwheels and a leapfrog. The track appears in Japanese game, Just Dance Wii U and the only song in Just Dance Wii U which features the original member Akari Hayami.

== Release ==
The single was released on May 5, 2010 in 7 versions: Regular Edition and one limited edition for each member: Limited Edition A, Limited Edition B, C, D, E, and F. Each limited edition has a different member on the cover. The single debuted at the 1st place in the Oricon Daily singles Chart and at the 3rd place in the Oricon Weekly Singles Chart, selling in that first week 22,537 copies.

On September 26, 2012, Momoiro Clover's already former label Universal J re-released the single under the title of "Ikuze! Kaitō Shōjo (Special Edition)" (行くぜっ！怪盗少女 ～Special Edition～). The 2012 re-release was a repackage of the original version. It only had one version, with the cover of the original Regular Edition, but it included a DVD with the original music video for the song "Ikuze! Kaitō Shōjo". The re-release debuted at number 6 in the Oricon daily singles chart and at number 7 for the week.

== Dance routine and music video ==
In some scenes of the music video, the members appear wearing costumes of a maid, a nurse, a policewoman, etc. The dance routine for the song incorporates intense acrobatics. One of the highlights of the video is Kanako Momota performing a so-called "shrimp jump" (えびぞり) (an upward jump with an arched back and both legs bent backwards, called a sheep jump in gymnastics). The jump is also the highlight of the group's live concerts. Also, at live performances of the song Shiori Tamai and Momoka Ariyasu do cartwheels and Kanako Momota performs a handspring.

== Promotion ==
On March 3, 2010, Momoiro Clover held a public signing ceremony for a contract to debut on a major label. It had already been determined that their future single would be "Ikuze! Kaitō Shōjo" and that it would be released on May 5. But, in order for the contract to be signed, the members had to pass a weight test. Each contractee was not to exceed an index determined by the formula: Idol weight (kg) = [Height (cm) − 100] × 0.8. If they did not pass, only a temporary contract would be signed. In the presence of around 200 fans and reporters, everyone had an "idol" weight except Reni Takagi who exceeded the limit by 0.8 kg. Therefore, it remained unclear whether the group would succeed in passing the test by May 5. At the same ceremony, the girls stated their goals for the year ahead, setting them as "To take the first place on Oricon, participate in Kōhaku Uta Gassen, give a concert at Budokan, and in Budokan to hold a handshake meeting with all the fans who came".

From March 6, Momoiro Clover started a tour in support of the single. They were to give 28 concerts.

== Reception ==
On May 3, 2010, the single debuted at the top of the daily Oricon singles chart. On May 4 it fell to the 14th place and on May 5 rose to number 12. In the Oricon weekly singles chart, it debuted at the 3rd place with 22,537 copies sold.

== Track listing ==
CD
No.	Title	Length
1.	"Ikuze! Kaitō Shōjo" (行くぜっ!怪盗少女)
2.	"Hashire!" (走れ!, "Run!")
3.	"Ikuze! Kaitō Shōjo" (Off Vocal ver.)
4.	"Hashire!" (Off Vocal ver.)

Special Edition DVD
No.	Title	Length
1.	"Ikuze! Kaitō Shōjo" (Music Video)

== Chart performance ==
Chart (2010)	Peak position
Oricon Daily Singles Chart	1
Oricon Weekly Singles Chart	3
Oricon Monthly Singles Chart	20
Billboard Japan Hot 100	19
Billboard Japan Hot Singles Sales	3

=== "Ikuze! Kaitō Shōjo (Special Edition)" ===
Chart (2012)	Peak position
Oricon Daily Singles Chart	6
Oricon Weekly Singles Chart	7
Oricon Monthly Singles Chart	44
Billboard Japan Hot 100	29
Billboard Japan Hot Singles Sales	6
Billboard Japan Adult Contemporary Airplay	57
