= Saraba, Itoshiki Kanashimitachi yo =

- Regular Edition cover

Single by Momoiro Clover Z

from the album 5th Dimension
- Released: November 21, 2012 (Japan)
- Genre: J-pop
- Length: 4:59
- Label: StarChild
- Composer: Tomoyasu Hotei
- Lyricist: Yuho Iwasato

Momoiro Clover Z singles chronology
| "Otome Sensō" (2012) | "Saraba, Itoshiki Kanashimitachi yo" (2012) | "Gounn" (2013) |

Momoclo Tei Ichimon singles chronology
| "Nippon Egao Hyakkei" (2012) |

Music videos
- Saraba, Itoshiki Kanashimitachi yo on YouTube on YouTube
- Wee-Tee-Wee-Tee on YouTube

"Saraba, Itoshiki Kanashimitachi yo" (サラバ、愛しき悲しみたちよ; "Farewell, My Dear Sorrows") is the 9th single by the Japanese female idol group Momoiro Clover Z, released in Japan on November 21, 2012. The title track became the group's first song to top the Billboard Japan Hot 100 chart. Composed and arranged by Tomoyasu Hotei, the song served as the theme song for the Nippon Television drama series Akumu-chan.

== Release ==
The single was released in two versions: a limited edition and a regular edition. The limited edition comes with a DVD featuring the music video for the title track, but contains fewer songs on the CD in comparison to the regular CD-only edition.

== Music ==
The title track is a theme song of the Nippon Television family drama series Akumu-chan starring Keiko Kitagawa. The song is composed and arranged by Tomoyasu Hotei.

The regular edition's B-side "Wee-Tee-Wee-Tee" is sung in Japanese and Furbish. It is an advertising song for robotic Furbies toys. The word wee-tee means "sing" in the Furbish language, and the title is translated in different Japanese news publications as either "Sing, Sing" or "Let's Sing!".

== Cover art and music video ==
The cover's theme is "good and evil". On the regular edition's cover the Momoiro Clover members are wearing white costumes and on the limited edition's — black, representing two outlooks on the world.

The music video for the title track elaborates further on the song's theme. In it, the girls are also wearing two types of clothes, black and white. They change between angel and demon costumes when switch between the voice of their conscience and the whispers of Satan. The video was directed by Hideki Kuroda, who notably shot music videos for such artists as SMAP and Southern All Stars.

In the making of the video, electroluminescent wire costumes were used. The glowing outfits had radio control systems hidden in them.

== Reception ==
On its debut day, the CD single sold 32,889 copies and placed 3rd in the Oricon daily ranking. It proceeded to win the 2nd place in the Oricon Weekly Singles Chart, Momoclo's highest to date, selling 73,745 copies in that first week.

With digital sales of the song "Saraba, Itoshiki Kanashimitachi yo", Momoclo scored their first number 1 in the RecoChoku Daily Chart. The video for "Saraba, Itoshiki Kanashimitachi yo" also topped the Recochoku daily ranking, in the video clips category.

In the Billboard Japan Hot 100 chart, which is published weekly, the title track debuted at the first place.

== Track listing ==
=== Limited edition ===
CD
| No. | Title | Length |
|---|---|---|
| 1. | "Saraba, Itoshiki Kanashimitachi yo" (サラバ、愛しき悲しみたちよ, "Farewell, My Dear Sorrows") | 4:58 |
| 2. | "Kuroi Shūmatsu" (黒い週末, "Black Weekend") | 6:20 |
| 3. | "Saraba, Itoshiki Kanashimitachi yo" (off vocal ver.) |
| 4. | "Kuroi Shūmatsu" (off vocal ver.) |

DVD
| No. | Title | Length |
|---|---|---|
| 1. | "Saraba, Itoshiki Kanashimitachi yo" (Music Video) |

=== Regular edition ===
CD
| No. | Title | Length |
|---|---|---|
| 1. | "Saraba, Itoshiki Kanashimitachi yo" | 4:58 |
| 2. | "Kuroi Shūmatsu" | 6:20 |
| 3. | "Wee-Tee-Wee-Tee" | 4:22 |
| 4. | "Saraba, Itoshiki Kanashimitachi yo" (off vocal ver.) |
| 5. | "Kuroi Shūmatsu (instrumental)" (off vocal ver.) |
| 6. | "Wee-Tee-Wee-Tee" (off vocal ver.) |

== Chart performance ==
| Chart (2012) | Peak position |
|---|---|
| Oricon Daily Singles Chart | 2 |
| Oricon Weekly Singles Chart | 2 |
| Oricon Monthly Singles Chart | 8 |
| Oricon Yearly Singles Chart | 84 |
| Billboard Japan Hot 100 | 1 |
| Billboard Japan Hot 100 Airplay | 8 |
| Billboard Japan Hot Singles Sales | 2 |
| Billboard Japan Adult Contemporary Airplay | 13 |

== Awards ==
| Year | Nominee / work | Award | Result |
|---|---|---|---|
| 2013 | "Saraba, Itoshiki Kanashimitachi yo" | Space Shower Music Video Awards — Special Award | Won |
| 2013 | "Saraba, Itoshiki Kanashimitachi yo" | MTV Video Music Award Japan for Best Choreography | Won |
