= Pinky Jones =

2010 single by Momoiro Clover Z

- Regular Edition's cover

Single by Momoiro Clover

from the album Battle and Romance
- B-side: Coco Natsu; Kimi to Sekai
- Released: November 10, 2010 (Japan)
- Genre: J-pop
- Label: Starchild

Momoiro Clover singles chronology
"Ikuze! Kaitō Shōjo" (2010)	"Pinky Jones" (2010)	"Mirai Bowl / Chai Maxx" (2011)

Music video
- "Pinky Jones" "Coco Natsu" (Live) on YouTube

"Pinky Jones" (ピンキージョーンズ, Pinkī Jōnzu) is the 2nd major-label single by the Japanese female idol group Momoiro Clover, released in Japan on November 10, 2010.

The single's title track was used as the second ending theme of the anime Yosuga no Sora.

== Track listing ==
CD
No.	Title	Length
1.	"Pinky Jones" (ピンキージョーンズ Pinkī Jōnzu)	4:12
2.	"Coco Natsu" (ココ☆ナツ Koko Natsu)	4:06
3.	"Kimi to Sekai" (キミとセカイ)	4:00
4.	"Pinky Jones" (off vocal ver)
5.	"Coco Natsu" (off vocal ver)
6.	"Kimi to Sekai" (off vocal ver)

Limited Edition A DVD
No.	Title	Length
1.	"Pinky Jones" (Music Video)

Limited Edition B DVD
No.	Title	Length
1.	"Coco Natsu" (Music Video)

Limited Edition C DVD
No.	Title	Length
1.	"Kimi to Sekai" (Music Video)

== Chart performance ==
Chart (2012)	Peak position
Oricon Daily Singles Chart	6
Oricon Weekly Singles Chart	8
Oricon Monthly Singles Chart	23
Billboard Japan Hot 100	28
