= D' no Junjō =

Single by Momoiro Clover Z

from the album Battle and Romance
- Released: July 6, 2011 (Japan)
- Genre: J-pop
- Label: StarChild
- Songwriters: Natsumi Tadano, Masaru Yokoyama

Momoiro Clover Z singles chronology
"Z Densetsu (Owarinaki Kakumei)" (2011)	"D' no Junjō" (2011)	"Rōdō Sanka" (2011)

Music video
- "D' no Junjō" on YouTube

"D' no Junjō" (D'の純情) is the 5th single by the Japanese female idol group Momoiro Clover Z, released in Japan on July 6, 2011. It was released on the same day with the 4th single, "Z Densetsu: Owarinaki Kakumei".

== Background ==
The single was released in only one edition and had just one song on it. It debuted at the 6th place in the Oricon Daily Singles Chart, while the simultaneously released 5th single "Z Densetsu: Owarinaki Kakumei" at the 5th.

On the cover and in the music video (that was released on the album Battle and Romance 3 weeks later, on July 27) all members are wearing kunoichi-style costumes.

"D' no Junjō" was used as an ending theme for Fuji Television series Kiseki Taiken! Unbelievable in July to September 2011.

== Track listing ==
CD
No.	Title	Length
1.	"D' no Junjō" (D'の純情)

== Charts ==
Chart (2011)	Peak position
Oricon Daily Singles Chart	2
Oricon Weekly Singles Chart	6
Billboard Japan Hot 100	59
Billboard Japan Hot Singles Sales	8
