= Kanako Momota =

Japanese idol actress and singer (born 1994)

- 百田 夏菜子
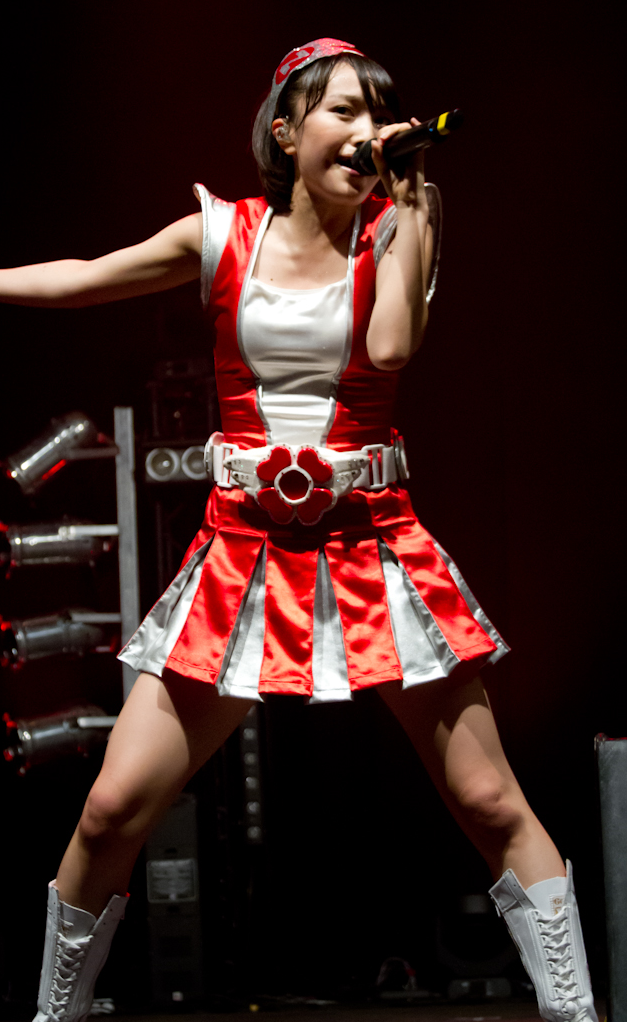
- Momota performing at the 2012 Japan Expo
- Born: July 12, 1994 (age 32); Hamamatsu, Shizuoka, Japan
- Occupations: Singer; actress
- Years active: 2005–present
- Spouse: Tsuyoshi Domoto (m. 2024)
- Musical career
- Genre: J-pop
- Years active: 2008–present
- Label: King Records
- Member of: Momoiro Clover Z
- Website: http://www.momoclo.net/

Kanako Momota (百田 夏菜子, Momota Kanako; born July 12, 1994) is a Japanese singer and actress, represented by Stardust Promotion. She is best known as the leader of the girl group Momoiro Clover Z. She has also provided the Japanese dub for Shuri in the Marvel Cinematic Universe, starting from Black Panther (2018).

Momota was ranked the 12th most popular Japanese idol of 2013 by Nihon Keizai Shimbun.

== Early life ==
Kanako Momota was born on July 12, 1994, in Hamamatsu, Shizuoka Prefecture, Japan. As of 2013, she still lived near Hamamatsu Station with her parents and two brothers.

Momota has trained in rhythmic gymnastics since the age of three, and jazz dance lessons since she was in the third grade of elementary school. In fifth grade, Momota auditioned for the Stardust Promotion talent agency with the encouragement of her mother and was subsequently signed to the agency's 3B Junior section, dedicated to training girls under 18 to become actresses.

== Career ==
In the spring of 2008, Stardust Promotion put her in a then unnamed idol (vocal and dance) group consisting of girls close to Momota's age. The project was very low budget, so they performed on the walkways in Yoyogi Park in Shibuya, Tokyo. A few months later, Momota replaced Reni Takagi as group leader. In a later interview, Momoiro Clover's manager Akira Kawakami recalled that from the very beginning Momota was the hardest worker and stated that she could be serious when needed, but naïve and spontaneous at the same time.

Momota was ranked the 12th most popular Japanese idol of 2013 by Nihon Keizai Shimbun. As of 2014, she held the lead performer position for all Momoiro Clover Z songs. Her performances incorporate elements of ballet, gymnastics, and acrobatics.

In 2011, Momota appeared in Mika Ninagawa's cosplay photoshoot series in the fashion magazine Zipper dressed as a bee and a ladybug. She continued to appear as a model in Ninagawa's works in Mgirl magazine from Fall/Winter 2011/2012 and again in the issue from Spring/Summer 2013. On April 14, 2012, Momota succeeded famous child actress Mana Ashida as subhost of the Nippon Television show Meringue no Kimochi. At that time, neither she nor Momoiro Clover Z was widely known. But when in 2013 it was announced that she would leave the program after almost a year and a half, there were worries that it would affect the popularity of the show. In August 2013, Momota became the first person to appear on both the front and back covers of an issue of QuickJapan magazine, which also published a lengthy interview with her.

=== Shrimp jump ===
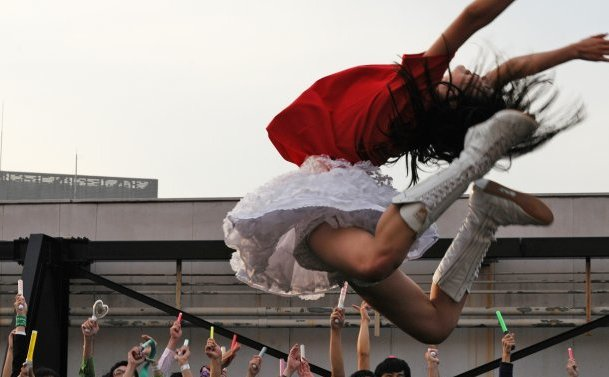
Kanako Momota's trademark "shrimp jump"

Momota's trademark stunt is a "shrimp jump" (jumping with an arched back and both legs bent backwards), which she performs during the song "Ikuze! Kaitō Shōjo" and which some consider a highlight of the group's live concerts. On October 4, 2013, she failed to land the jump and fell on her buttocks. The accident caused a stir among fans and was widely reported by the Japanese media, appearing at the top of Yahoo! Japan website. Momota was not injured.

== Personal life ==
On January 11, 2024, Momota and KinKi Kids member Tsuyoshi Domoto announced their marriage.

== Discography ==
=== Studio albums ===
- #Vitamin B (#ビタミンＢ) (2025)

=== Live albums ===
- Talk with Me: Cinderella Time (Talk With Me～シンデレラタイム) (2022)

=== Video albums ===
- Momotamai Marriage Live (Kanako Momota & Shiori Tamai, 2017)
- Talk with Me: Cinderella Time (Talk With Me～シンデレラタイム) (2022)
- Talk with Me Xmas Night: Cinderella Time (Talk With Me Xmas Night ～シンデレラタイム～) (2024)

=== EPs ===
- 30th (2024)

=== Singles ===
- "Ring the Bell" / "Yofuke no Amōre" (夜更けのアモーレ) (Kanako Momota & Shiori Tamai, 2016)
- "Akai Maboroshi Yoru" (赤い幻夜) (2021)
- "Christmas Shiyo" (クリスマスしよ♡) (2023)
- "Ojyamajyo Carnival" (おジャ魔女カーニバル!!) (with Hiroko Moriguchi for Anison Covers 2 album, 2024)
- "Horetaga Kachi no I LOVE YOU" (惚れたが勝ちのI LOVE YOU) (2025)

== Filmography ==
=== Feature films ===
- Shirome (2010)
- Ninifuni (2012)
- Spotlight (short, 2012)
- The Curtain Rises (2015)
- Kaiketsu Zorori: ZZ no Himitsu (2017)
- Looking for Magical Doremi (2020), Reika Kawatani (voice)
- Love, Life and Goldfish (2021), Yoshino Ikoma

=== Television ===
- Beppinsan (べっぴんさん) (2016)
- Plastic Smile (静岡発地域ドラマ『プラスティック・スマイル』) (2018)
- Yakusoku no Stage: Toki wo Kakeru Futari no Uta (約束のステージ 〜時を駆けるふたりの歌〜) (2019)
- Kotaro Lives Alone (コタローは1人暮らし) (2021), Ayano Kobayashi
- Trillion Game (トリリオンゲーム) (2023), Akari Shirotora

=== Variety shows ===
- Shokora Aisareru Onna — Kirawareru Onna Grand Prix (ショコラ〜愛される女 嫌われる女グランプリ) (2009, NTV)
- Meringue no Kimochi (メレンゲの気持ち) (April 2012 — September 2013, NTV) — subhost

=== Other ===
- Momodora (ももドラ momo+dra) (5-episode internet omnibus film, 2011, released on DVD and Blu-ray in 2012)
- Black Panther - Shuri (Japanese dub)
- Avengers: Infinity War - Shuri (Japanese dub)
- Avengers: Endgame - Shuri (Japanese dub)
- Black Panther: Wakanda Forever - Shuri / Black Panther (Japanese dub)
- Avengers: Doomsday - Shuri / Black Panther (Japanese dub)
- Gekijo Sujinashi in Nagoya Dai Ni Ya (2) Momota Kanako (Momoiro Clover Z) Kanzen Hozon Ban (劇場スジナシ in 名古屋 第二夜 百田夏菜子(ももいろクローバーZ)完全保存版) - (theatrical performance with Shōfukutei Tsurube II, released on DVD in 2015)
- Momotamaikon (ももたまい婚) - (duo concert with Shiori Tamai, released on DVD and Blu-ray in 2017)
