= Reni Takagi =

- 高城 れに
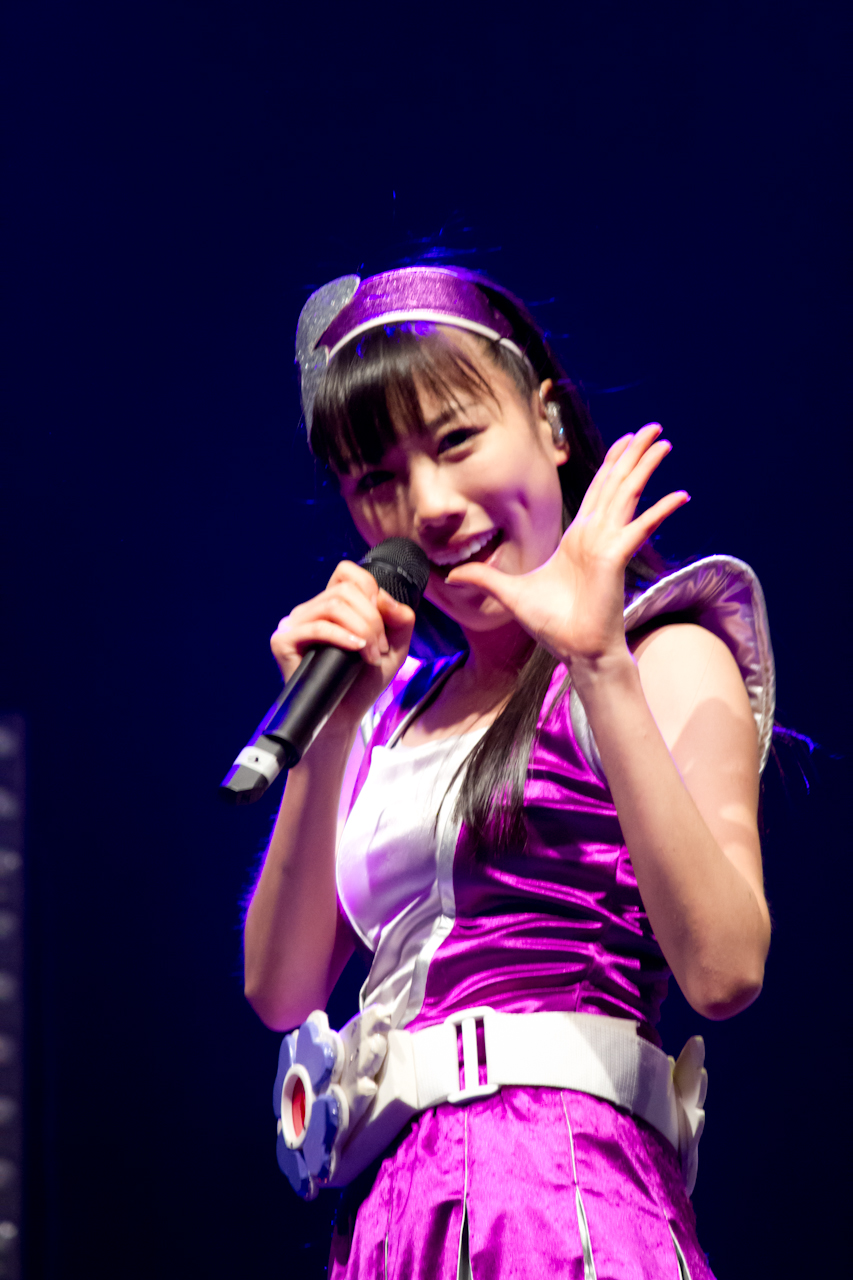
- Takagi performing at the 2012 Japan Expo
- Born: June 21, 1993 (age 33)
- Other name: Reni (nickname)
- Occupation: Singer
- Spouse: Shingo Usami (m. 2022; div. 2023)
- Musical career
- Genre: Pop
- Years active: 2007–present
- Label: King Records
- Member of: Momoiro Clover Z
- Website: momoclo.net

Reni Takagi (高城 れに, Takagi Reni; born June 21, 1993) is a Japanese idol and a member of the girl group Momoiro Clover Z. She is the former leader of the group, before leadership was passed to Kanako Momota, and her signature color in the group is purple.

Takagi was born in Kanagawa Prefecture. In April 2012, she became a DJ of her own radio show called Takagi Reni no King of Rock.

== Personal life ==
On November 6, 2022, Takagi announced her marriage to Shingo Usami., a professional baseball player for the Hokkaido Nippon-Ham Fighters. In December 2023, Takagi and Usami announced they had divorced.

== Appearances ==
- Maku ga Agaru (幕が上がる) (film, 2015)

== Solo work ==
=== Songs ===
- "Koi wa Abare Oni Daiko" (恋は暴れ鬼太鼓) (2011)
- "Tsugaruhantō Ryuhiki" (津軽半島龍飛崎) (2012)
- "Shokora Raion" (しょこららいおん) (2016)
- "Marugoto Reni-chan" (まるごとれにちゃん) (2017)
- "Issho ni" (一緒に) (2017)
- "3 Moji" no Takaramono (『3文字』の宝物) (2017)
- "Tail Wind" (2018)
- "Jirettai na" (じれったいな) (2019)
- "Spart!" (2019)
- "You are Not Alone" (ユーアノッアロン) (Nagano & Takagi) (2019)
- "Everyday Reni-chan" (everyday れにちゃん) (2019)
- "Dancing Reni-chan" (Dancing れにちゃん) (2020)
- "Sky High" (2021)
- "Go! Go! Heaven" (2021)
- "Janai hou" (じゃないほう) (2022)
- "Love is Show" (Masayuki Suzuki feat. Reni Takagi) (2022)
- "Reni Raikou!!" (レニー来航！！) (Reni Takagi with Cypress Ueno and Roberto Yoshino) (2023)
- "M&S〜mama papa e〜" (M&S〜ママパパへ〜) (2023)
- "Positive Attention Please!" (ポジティブ・アテンションプリーズ！) (2024)
- "Kimiiro no Hikari" (君色のひかり) (2024)

=== Studio albums ===
- Reni-chan WORLD (れにちゃんWORLD) (2021)

=== Video albums ===
- Marugoto Reni-chan Live (まるごとれにちゃん LIVE) (2017)
- Nagano and Takagi. (永野と高城。) (2018)
- Marugoto Renichan 2019 in Culttz Kawasaki Live (まるごとれにちゃん 2019 in カルッツかわさき LIVE) (2019)
- Nagano and Takagi. 2 (永野と高城。2) (2019)
- Nagano and Takagi. 3 (永野と高城。3) (2020)
- Marugoto Kaiko 30sai LIVE BOX (まるごと開高30祭 LIVE BOX) (2024)

=== Books ===
- 2023: Momoiro Clover Z: Reni Takagi First Photobook: 9 Kaw
