= Music in advertising =

Music in advertising refers to music integrated into mass electronic media advertisements to enhance its success. Music in advertising affects the way viewers perceive the brand by different means and on different levels, and "can significantly affect the emotional response to television commercials." It also affects the musicians whose music is featured in advertisements.

== Functions of music in advertising ==
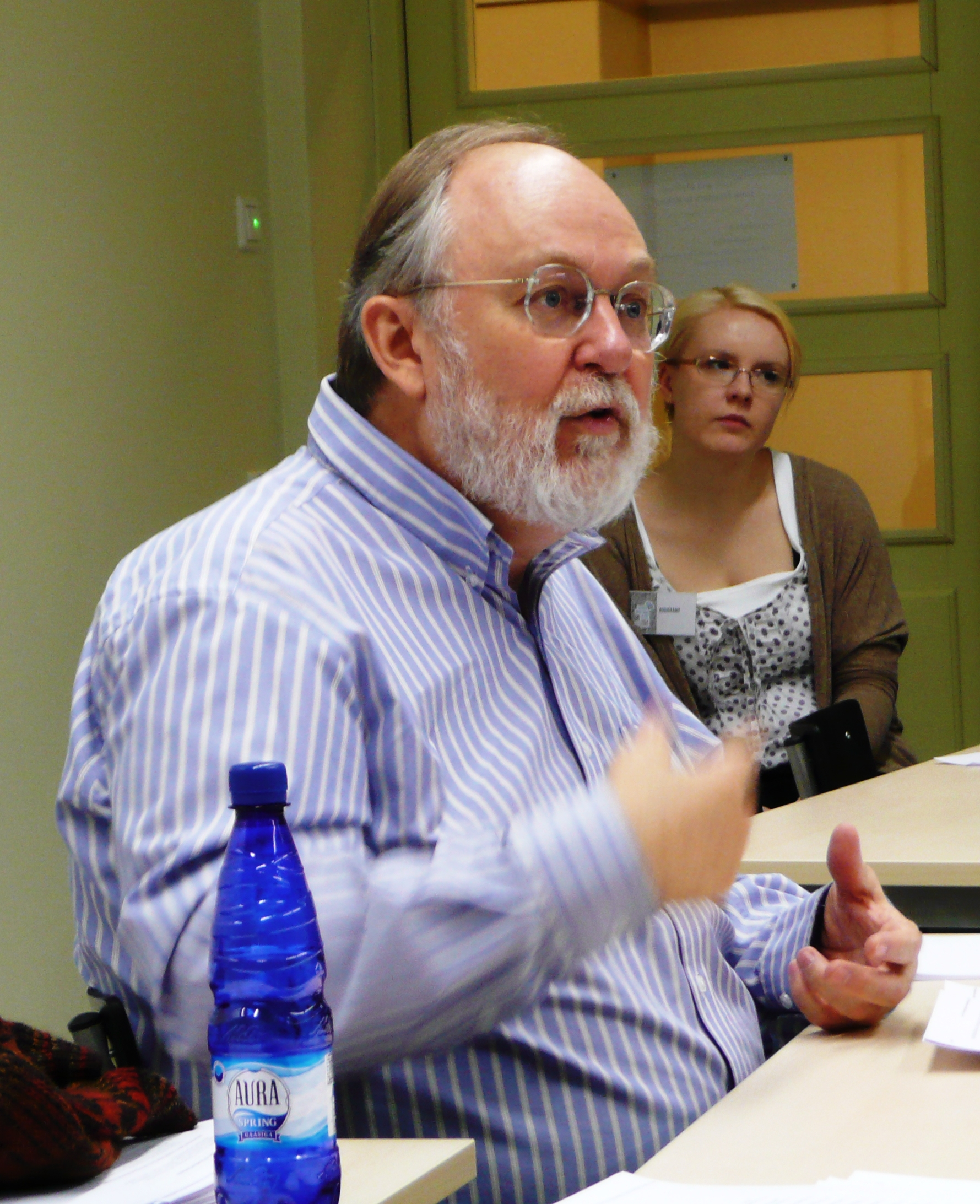
David Huron is a professor at Ohio State University, in the Schools of Music and the Center for Cognitive and Brain Sciences.

In advertising, "music can serve the overall promotional goals in one or more of several capacities." David Huron proposes six primary categories, which include: entertainment, structure and continuity, memorability, lyrical language, targeting, and authority establishment. Also, it can be used to appeal to a person's emotions and senses. The targeting of one's emotions is done so that the audience is swayed toward what is being advertised. Using music to influence a person's emotional state is effective, since "music has a significant influence on the consumer's emotional state and mood, which is an important concept in the establishment of attitudes since mood states seem to bias judgments and opinions in the same direction as the mood state". Being able to use music in advertising has made advertisements more enticing and attention-getting for the audience. Fifteen seconds is currently the standard duration of a television commercial so advertisers need to be able to successfully grab their audience's attention, which music does.

=== Entertainment ===
The entertainment aspect of music helps make an advertisement more appealing by adding aesthetic value to it. An advertisement that has high aesthetic value will be able to capture more attention from the audience. From this point of view, "music need not necessarily manifest any special affinity with a particular product or service in order to play an effective and useful function."

American Society for the Prevention of Cruelty to Animals (ASPCA) is known for the use of sad music in advertisements.

==== Emotion and music ====
Music can be used as a cue to help drive a message to viewers. The music in an advertisement can be an indirect influence on the viewer's attitude towards the product being shown. Exciting music has been shown to increase arousal in skin response and heart rate which can be seen as a physical form of showing emotion through music. Sad music has been shown to influence the purchase of intent more than either happy or no music at all.

===== ASPCA and the use of music in advertisements =====
An example of the use of sad music is in the American Society for the Prevention of Cruelty to Animals (ASPCA) advertisements. The ASPCA uses sad music to help add emotion to the images and videos being shown to help drive the viewer to donate money to help the suffering animals. The music in the advertisement is used as a tool to get the viewer to empathize with the animals.

=== Structure and continuity ===
Music supports an advertisement's structure and continuity by mediating between disjoint images. Accompanying a TV commercial, music either structures the narrative or tells a narrative itself. It can also create an antagonist and protagonist within this narrative by giving them typical musical figures, harmonies or melodies. Moreover, music can emphasize dramatic moments within the advertisement, and therefore creates both structure and continuity.

==== Music and its message in advertisements ====
Music can be used to carry the message of the advertisement which gives the music a dominant role or just be in the background. If the music is used in the background instead it can be used to emphasize a key brand attribute or the logo.

=== Memorability ===
Music in advertising is "the most common musical technique for aiding memorability and hence product recall". A theory suggests that the initial sound (or notes in the case of music) activates a cohort of possible matches in memory, which is narrowed as the sound (or melody) progresses.

Music serves the function of making a product more memorable to viewers, as it is known to "linger in the listener's mind." When used in an advertisement, the content of the ad lingers along with the music. Easily recognizable music is put in television ads to produce a "significant positive relationship with recall and comprehension" for the viewer. On top of this, "recall of information is improved when cued with a well-known song." Advertisements strategically use popular music to make a lasting impression on viewers.

The ability to be able to attract a consumer to a product usually requires an advertisement to be presented memorably. Whether it be in a catchy, recognizable song or with loud, vivid colors, and effective commercial or advertisement must come across fantastically for the consumer to consider taking a product into account. The viewer must be drawn to the advertisement for the product to be remembered later. Music is the number one way for companies to entice a consumer or buyer, usually spending up to half of a million dollars to create commercials that will stand out to the public. In this, it includes using popular music that appeals to younger audiences, celebrities and musical artists that many can recognize, and star athletes that many look up to. "Picture-word congruency [was] found to enhance verbal recall when the picture does not evoke distracting imagery." Music has a great part in drawing in a consumer to consider an item for purchasing, but visuals tend to enhance the advertisement for later recall. In times where both lyrical and visual advertisements are presented, it brings positive invocations to the viewer and memorizing certain products becomes more effective and easier for future recall. Studies have been conducted to compare various elements of "stimulus congruency" that prove how higher volume advertisements turn the eye and make products more appealing. Through this, companies become more involved in how to boost their products through musical advertising for the benefit of the message applied. It becomes easier to target younger people, seeing as that their ability to memorize words of a song faster and therefore creating commercials and advertisements that trend worldwide with their specific musical taste.

=== Lyrical language ===
For providing rational facts at the same time "mixtures of speech and song provide advertisers with opportunities for both logical, factual appeals through spoken and written language and emotive, poetic appeals through music."

Contemporary advertisers must overcome the viewer's innate skepticism, which developed over the years through desensitization. Music can provide a message without the customers consciously noticing it; in other words, they are "uninvolved, nondecision-making consumers rather than cognitive active problem solvers."

=== Targeting ===
Using different kinds of musical genres in the advertising world helps advertisers draw from the kind of audience they think will be interested in their products. The idea that there is a specific group of people that an advertiser is trying to reach is called the target audience and music is a significant aspect of what draws the target audience in.

Music can create different moods and sway people of different groups into thinking or feeling certain ways. The different tempos, time changes, pitches, and content of the music can target anyone or many groups of people the advertiser may be trying to reach.

Often, music in advertisements shows a viewer what a product is before the advert states it. According to Linda M. Scott, "Studies of advertising music share an underlying theory in which music is an effective background component that causes attachment to the product without the cognitive involvement of the viewer." Music can create a bond between a viewer and a product, which is why it is considered important for advertisers to choose the right music for their target audience.

=== Authority establishment ===
Authority establishment in music in advertising is the idea that using specific kinds of music can help give an advertisement more credibility because of the artist being used in the ad. This is another way that companies can help persuade consumers to buy their products. Using a specific song that holds weight in the target audience the advertiser is trying to reach can strengthen the bond between the product and the consumer.

=== Effects on credibility ===
Credibility is often brought to question when considering how music is used in present-day advertising and marketing efforts. It is proven that certain types of music can lend credibility to individuals, companies or even specific products. This is exactly what advertisers want to have happened and they particularly prefer music as a source of adding credibility to their subjects.

Credibility has two key components: trustworthiness and expertise, which both have objective and subjective components. Trustworthiness is based more on subjective factors but can include objective measurements such as established reliability. Expertise can be similarly subjectively perceived, but also includes relatively objective characteristics of the source or message (e.g., credentials, certification or information quality). Secondary components of credibility include source dynamism (charisma) and physical attractiveness.

Credibility online has become an important topic since the mid-1990s. This is because the web has increasingly become an information resource.

Entertainment-"It simply draws attention to the advertisement or to the product. In this case, the music in the advertisement does not necessarily need to have anything to do with the product"(Andersen 260). The entertaining part of an advertisement is one of the most crucial steps to getting customers to buy the product. Music brings a certain flavor to an advertisement, without the music the ad would seem bleak. Music can create emotion and motivate people. When paired with the right ad music can make a person associate the product with a certain feeling enabling them to go purchase the product.

The same can be said for advertisements. Generally, people are familiar with Nike, Puma and New Balance. A fairly new shoe company would have to work harder to gain customers. If a person/company is virtually unknown, they must create a sense of trust, believability in themselves and their product. People need to see evidence that the person/company can be trusted. The well-known person/company has to live up to the previous expectations and not disappoint those who have shown up to see them speak and possibly purchase the product. The advertising and marketing industry calls this brand management.

On the other hand, the use of music in advertising, especially on platforms such as social media or television, are seen as less credible compared to advertisements that lack music and are placed in newspapers or articles. Consumers tend to have a more positive attitude towards commercials that supply accurate and relevant information about a product or a service that the consumer desires. Consumers rely on the credibility of what's being advertised so for them to trust in the advertisers' message or product there has to be solidified evidence for it.

== Relationship with musician ==
Music affects the moral value of the artist, in the sense the music he/she makes out of their feelings and emotional drive is then used for a car commercial, or maybe one of their songs is used for a mayonnaise commercial. This could be seen as "the ultimate sellout that offended aesthetic and bohemian values" Being that the original intent for the song was not intended for the random advertisement, musicians may feel cheated.

On the other hand, "by contrast, today advertisements represent one of the best opportunities for many musicians to gain access to mainstream markets." So, a musician having his or her song used in a popular ad may contribute to the success of that song.

== Interaction of music and brand ==
In general, one could say that music can be altered in meaning depending on its context. This is an opportunity for advertisers to create meaning for their brand by employing musical pieces for their interest. Music has "a potential for the construction or negotiation of meaning in specific contexts." That means that some music can match better with one type of product than with another type. Different musical types can i.e. target high culture or popular culture-oriented customers. The reason is that "musical styles and genres offer unsurpassed opportunities for communicating complex social or attitudinal messages practically instantaneously." One could say that music is worth a thousand words. That's why music became more and more important to advertisers. They have the chance to transfer specific characteristics connoted to certain musical types to their products. "Music now is more often employed as 'borrowed interest' capturing a feeling, setting a mood, recalling past experiences and playing them back on behalf of the sponsors." All these attributes help an advertisement appealing to the life world or lifestyle of the targeted group.

Music "transfers its attributes to the story-line and the product, it creates coherence, making connections that are not there in the words or pictures; it even engenders meanings of its own ... the music interprets the words and pictures." A brand's, product's or service's value is enhanced by the connection to music. It adopts meanings which are inherent in the music because "the object itself is not enough to sell it; it must also be linked to some sort of personal meaning, the very essence of branding." That means that a brand or product has to pick up some kind of connotation that is added by the music. Also, a certain artist can change or shape an advert so that it fits a certain target group. "Advertising is not about what the product does but who the consumer is" and so advertisements have to find a good balance between adopting meaning from a used musical piece or artist and providing context in return to become authentic. Both the music and the advertisement can benefit from this symbiosis. There are artists and music bands that became famous through having their music inside of adverts which can in return mean to sacrifice their music to the brand.

"The joining of music culture, through either a licensed track or the appearance of an artist, with a product or service in a commercial brings new connotations to both artist [and also the music] and company while naturalizing the relationship between the two. The value of articulating popular music to a product can be seen as especially important to advertisers competing with products similar, if not identical, in use-value."

=== History ===
Since the late 1920s, music has been a fundamental part of advertising. In the earliest adverts, companies would use jingles and specially composed songs to explicitly promote the product being advertised. In 1926, the first radio jingle was for Wheaties cereal, encouraging the audience to try Wheaties. As businesses started to become aware of the influence of music on consumers in advertising, a major emphasis on music in commercial services started to play an important part in the creation of consumer attitudes and associations towards the advertised product and brand.

In 1934, "Muzak", which is best known as the leader in business music, was founded. "Muzak" is a company brand of background music played in retail stores and other companies. In 1944, the first television commercial jingle "Chiquita Banana", was broadcast across movie theaters. The jingle is described as catchy and informed the audience in various ways they can consume a banana. In the 1970s, Ronnie Bond, a jingle writer, created popular jingles such as Brank Flake's "Tasty Tasty, very very tasty" and Coco Pops' "I'd rather have a bowl of Coco Pops." In the 1980s, children became the targeted audience for advertisers, advertising children's toys during cartoons. Up until 1985, the movement of the "jingle" ended, advertisers shifted to more developed and structured full-fledged songs for advertisement. In the 1990s, now television breaks have extended 12–15 minutes per an hour-long program. Eventually, in the 21st century "jingles" made a comeback because jingles are catchy, causing the audience to associate the jingle with the product being advertised. Over the years, the use of music in advertising has not changed dramatically, it has just become more modernized and influenced by society's needs.

== See also ==
- Sound trademark – Auditory trademark
