= Momoka Ariyasu =

Japanese singer and photographer (born 1995)

- 有安 杏果
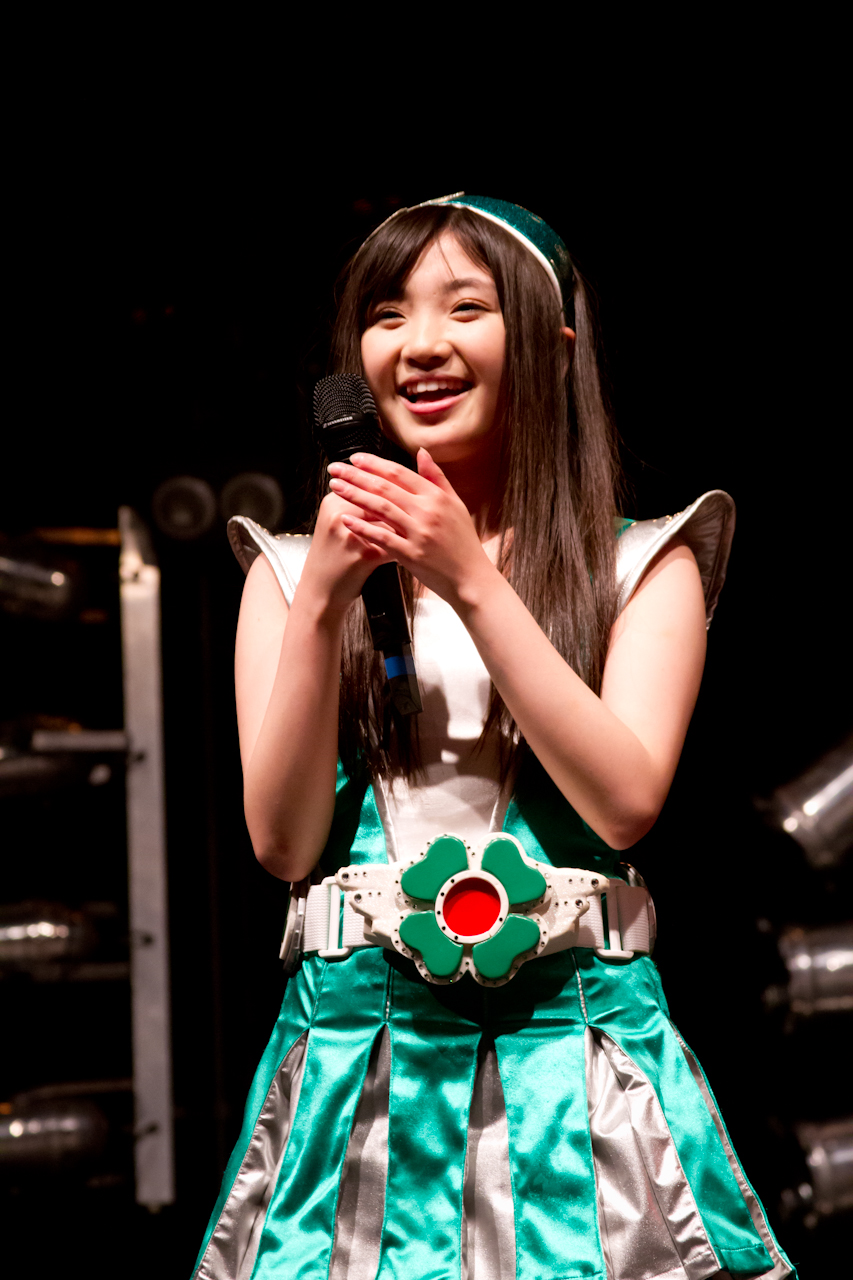
- Ariyasu performing at the 2012 Japan Expo
- Born: March 15, 1995 (age 31); Kyoto Prefecture, Japan
- Other names: Momokā~, Ariyasu~ (nicknames)
- Education: Nihon University
- Occupations: Singer; Photographer; Actress
- Years active: 1996–2018; 2019–present
- Musical career
- Genre: J-pop
- Instruments: Vocals, guitar
- Years active: 2004–2018; 2019–present
- Formerly of: Momoiro Clover Z

YouTube information
- Channel: Ariyasu Momoka YouTube Official Channel
- Years active: 2019–present
- Genre: Music
- Subscribers: 21,100
- Views: 2,395,538
- Last updated: 13 September 2025
- Website: Official website

Momoka Ariyasu (有安 杏果, Ariyasu Momoka; born March 15, 1995) is a Japanese singer and photographer, as well as a former idol and child actress. She is best known as a former member of the all-girl musical group Momoiro Clover Z, in which her signature color was green.

== Biography ==
Ariyasu was born in Kyoto Prefecture and grew up in Saitama Prefecture. Since the age of one, she has started acting as a baby magazine model. She was later represented by talent agency Carotte C&T and appeared on television shows and in numerous commercials.

Starting in 2004, Ariyasu regularly appeared on the Fuji TV network's morning children's program Ponkikkids, where she acted as a member of a unit called Sister Rabbits. Around the same time, she joined EXPG, the boy-band Exile's dance and vocal school for kids. The school members performed as child dancers for Exile and also received acting lessons.

On November 1, 2008, Ariyasu moved from Carotte to the Stardust Promotion talent agency, and on February 2, 2009, was put into the agency's all-girl idol group Power Age. Power Age had been launched in 2005 with members of elementary to high-school age, but it was nearing the end of its existence when she joined. Three months later, in May, the band was disbanded. On July 26, 2009, Ariyasu was added as a sixth member to the idol group Momoiro Clover, which was about to release its first indies single.

On November 9, 2012, Ariyasu's video comment was projected at Hige Danshaku's live comedy show at Molière Theater in Shinjuku, Tokyo. During the performance, Louis Yamada LIII revealed that he was an avid fan of Ariyasu and had even named his recently born daughter Momoka (百(もも)夏(か); a homophone written with different kanji) after her.

On January 1, 2013, it was announced that Ariyasu would refrain from singing and talking until the end of January. As it was explained, she was receiving treatment for her throat and needed to let her vocal cords rest. On February 7, it was announced that another full month, until the end of February, was needed to complete the treatment and therefore in the upcoming events and broadcasts, Ariyasu would communicate by means of writing and other members would take turns in performing her solo parts in songs.

Ariyasu attended the Faculty of Arts at Nihon University and graduated from Department of Photography in March 2017. She was awarded the special prize of the art department (first in the university's nearly 100 years history) and the photography department encouragement prize (only 4 out of 96 graduates of photography department). She was the only university graduate among the Momoiro Clover Z members.

On January 15, 2018, Ariyasu announced on her personal blog that she would graduate Momoiro Clover Z to live life without any schedules or plans. Her last performance as a member of Momoiro Clover Z took place on January 21, 2018.

=== After Momoiro Clover Z: solo career and marriage ===
On January 15, 2019, exactly one year after her graduation announcement, Ariyasu announced her comeback as a performer while continuing her activities as a photographer. She would be represented by her own company, Apricot, Inc. (株式会社アプリコット), (Note: The kanji 杏 in Ariyasu's name also means "apricot") and announced two concerts in Tokyo and Osaka.

On February 6, 2019, Ariyasu announced that she is in a relationship with her therapist who she first met in 2016 and started dating in 2018. They got married on November 23. Ariyasu has stated that she intends to stay active in the entertainment industry.

== Image ==
Ariyasu's Momoiro Clover "image color" (i.e., the color she wore during public appearances and the light stick color of her fans) was green. At 148 cm (4 ft 10 in), she is the shortest member of the group. The tagline she uses when introducing herself to audiences is "Silly little giant" (ちょっぴりおバカな小さな巨人). She characterizes herself as "baka" ("silly", "stupid"), saying that at school she cannot understand fundamental things or remember anything, but her co-members say she actually studies all the time, even backstage. Ariyasu explains that it is exactly because she is stupid that she has to study hard. Her favorite subjects are English, mathematics and Japanese. In 2025, she obtained the Eiken Grade Pre-1 English proficiency certification.

== Associated acts ==
- Sister Rabbits (シスターラビッツ) (since 2004)
- Power Age (February 2 — May 30, 2009)
- Momoiro Clover Z (July 26, 2009 – January 21, 2018)

== Discography ==
=== Singles ===
No.	Title	Release date	Charts			Album
No.	Title	Release date	JPN Oricon	Billboard Japan Hot 100	Sales	Album
Apricot Music Records
Digital 1	"Sakura Tone" (サクラトーン)	March 4, 2020	—	—		Non-album singles
Digital 2	"Niji mu Namida" (虹む涙, Rainbow Tears)	March 4, 2020	—	—		Non-album singles
Digital 3	"Runaway"	July 22, 2020	—	—		Non-album singles
Digital 4	"Natsuomoi" (ナツオモイ)	August 12, 2020	—	—		Non-album singles
Digital 5	"Yume no tochū" (夢の途中, The middle of a dream)	March 24, 2023	—	—		Non-album singles

=== Mini-Album ===
No.	Title	Release date	Charts	
No.	Title	Release date	JPN Oricon	Sales
King Records
1	"Kokoro no Senritsu ♪ feel a heartbeat" (ココロノセンリツ♪ feel a heartbeat)	July 3, 2016	—	

=== Studio albums ===
No.	Title	Release date	Charts	
No.	Title	Release date	JPN Oricon	Sales
King Records
1	"Kokoro no Oto" (ココロノオト)	October 11, 2017	4	21,798

=== Live Albums ===
No.	Title	Release date	Charts	
No.	Title	Release date	JPN Oricon	Sales
Apricot Music Records
Digital 1	"Momoka Ariyasu Sakulive 2019 -Another Story-" (有安杏果 サクライブ 2019 ～Another story～)	June 24, 2019	—	
Digital 2	"Momoka Ariyasu Pop Step Zepp Tour 2019" (有安杏果 Pop Step Zepp Tour 2019)	October 14, 2020	— (Note: "Momoka Ariyasu Pop Step Zepp Tour 2019" did not enter Oricon Weekly Albums Ranking, but peaked at number 46 on the component Oricon Weekly Digital Album Ranking.)	
Digital 3	"Momoka Ariyasu Sakulive (Acoustic Tour 2022)" (有安杏果 サクライブ (Acoustic Tour 2022))	June 16, 2023	—	

=== Video Albums ===
No.	Title	Release date	Charts	
No.	Title	Release date	DVD	Blu-ray
King Records
1	"Kokoro no Senritsu -Feel a heartbeat- Vol.0 Live" (ココロノセンリツ ～Feel a heartbeat～ Vol. 0 Live)	May 31, 2017	14	9
2	"Kokoro no Senritsu -feel a heartbeat- Vol.1.5 Live" (ココロノセンリツ ～Feel a heartbeat～ Vol. 1.5 Live)	March 28, 2018	19	6
Apricot Music Records
3	"Momoka Ariyasu Pop Step Zepp Tour 2019" (有安杏果 Pop Step Zepp Tour 2019)	August 26, 2020	—	166
4	"Momoka Ariyasu Sakulive 2019 -Another Story-" (有安杏果 サクライブ 2019 ～Another story～)	August 26, 2020	—	—

== Bibliography ==
- Momoka Ariyasu (June 25, 2016), Kokoro no Sen Ritsu (in Japanese) (Hardcover ed.), Tokyo: Ohta Publishing, ISBN 978-4-778-31529-0
- Momoka Ariyasu (July 29, 2019), Happy Holidays (Momoka Ariyasu SNS 2018 Mar. - 2019 Mar.) (in Japanese) (Hardcover ed.), Tokyo: Crevis, ISBN 978-4-909532-24-4
- Momoka Ariyasu (July 29, 2019), Momoka Ariyasu Photo Works: Hikari no koe (in Japanese) (Hardcover ed.), Tokyo: Crevis, ISBN 978-4-909532-23-7

== Appearances ==
=== Movies ===
- Gin no Angel (銀のエンゼル) (2004)
- Shirome (2010)
- Ninifuni (NINIFUNI) (short, February 4, 2012)
- Momodora (ももドラ momo+dra) (5-episode straight-to-DVD omnibus film, 2012)
- Maku ga Agaru (幕が上がる) (2015)

=== TV dramas ===
- French Potato Cup (フレンチポテトカップ) (1999, Yomiuri TV)
- Saturday Drama Special Shijō no Koi: Ai wa Umi o Koete (至上の恋〜愛は海を越えて〜) (2001, NHK)
- Suntory Mystery Prize Special Toki no Nagisa (スペシャル 時の渚) (2001, TV Asahi)
- Monday Mystery Theater Pet Sitter Sawaguchi Hanako no Jikenbo (ペットシッター沢口華子の事件簿) (2001, TBS)
- Tuesday Suspense Theater Oyaji (親父) (2001, NTV)
- SMAP×SMAP special Tokubetsu-hen Saranheyo Ai no Gekijō no Ai no Uta "Kenbo Haseyo: Shiawase ni Nare yo" (サランヘヨ愛の劇場の愛の唄「ケンボハセヨ〜幸せになれよ〜」) (2002, Fuji TV)
- Hamidashi Keiji Jōnetsu Kei (はみだし刑事情熱系) (Ep. 359, 2002, TV Asahi)
- Kindaichi Shōnen no Jikenbo SP (金田一少年の事件簿SP) (2005, NTV)
- Friday Entertainment Okusama wa Keishi Sōkan (奥様は警視総監) (2006, Fuji TV)
- Drama 30 Gakincho: Return Kids (がきんちょ〜リターン・キッズ〜) (2006, MBS TV)

=== TV variety shows ===
- Ronbu Gragon (ロンブー龍) (2001, NTV)
- Ponkikkids 2 (ポンキッキーズ21) (2004–2005, Fuji TV) — as Momoka from the band Sisters Rabbit
- Mecha-Mecha Iketeru! Ii Imi Yabaissu Okazairu Special (いい意味でヤバイっす オカザイルスペシャル) (2007, Fuji TV) — as one of Exile's backup dancers

=== Music videos ===
- Asuka Hayashi – "Chiisaki Mono" (小さきもの) (2003)
- SMAP – "Tomodachi e (Say What You Will)" (友だちへ〜Say What You Will〜) (2005)
- Exile – "Choo Choo Train" (Choo Choo TRAIN) (2008)
- Exile – "The Galaxy Express 999" (2008)

=== Sport ===
- Wrestle Kingdom 10 in Tokyo Dome (2016)
