= List of Sailor Moon Crystal episodes =

Japanese promotional poster for the first season of Sailor Moon Crystal

Sailor Moon Crystal (Note: Also known as Pretty Guardian Sailor Moon Crystal (Japanese: 美少女戦士セーラームーンCrystal(クリスタル), Hepburn: Bishōjo Senshi Sērā Mūn Kurisutaru)) is the second anime adaptation of the Sailor Moon manga series by Naoko Takeuchi, and serves as a reboot by closely following the original manga than the first anime series. Directed by Munehisa Sakai at Toei Animation, written by Yūji Kobayashi, and character designed by Yukie Sakō, the first two seasons of the series were streamed worldwide on the Niconico website from July 5, 2014, to July 18, 2015, and the Blu-ray updated version aired on Tokyo MX between April 6 and September 28, 2015. The 26 episodes covered the corresponding chapters of the re-release manga (Dark Kingdom and Black Moon arc). From episodes 1–26, the opening theme is "MOON PRIDE" while the ending theme is "Moonbow" both by Momoiro Clover Z.

The third season, directed by Chiaki Kon, and character designed by Akira Takahashi, aired on Tokyo MX between April 4 and June 27, 2016. The 13 episodes covered the Infinity arc of the manga. From episodes 27–39, the opening theme is "Fall in Love with the New Moon" by Etsuko Yakushimaru (ep 27–30, 39), Mitsuko Horie (ep 31–34), and Momoiro Clover Z (ep 35–38) while the ending themes are "Eternal Eternity" by Junko Minagawa and Sayaka Ohara (as Sailor Uranus and Sailor Neptune, ep 27–30, 39), "A Maiden's Advice" by Misato Fukuen (as Chibiusa, ep 31–34), and "Eternity Brings Two Together" by Kenji Nojima (as Tuxedo Mask, ep 35–38).

A sequel two-part anime film titled Pretty Guardian Sailor Moon Eternal The Movie, directed by Chiaki Kon at both Toei Animation and Studio Deen, written by Kazuyuki Fudeyasu, and character designed by Kazuko Tadano, was released in 2021, with the first film on January 8, and the second film on February 11. The films covered the Dream arc of the manga. The main theme for both films are "Moon Color Chainon", performed by Momoiro Clover Z with Sailor5Guardians, (Note: The main voice actresses for the Inner Sailor Guardians: Kotono Mitsuishi (as Sailor Moon), Hisako Kanemoto (as Sailor Mercury), Rina Satō (as Sailor Mars), Ami Koshimizu (as Sailor Jupiter) and Shizuka Itō (as Sailor Venus)) and the ending themes are "Wanting to be Together with You" by Yoko Ishida (first film), and "I'll Go As Myself" by ANZA (second film).

Another sequel two-part anime film titled Pretty Guardian Sailor Moon Cosmos The Movie, directed by Tomoya Takahashi at Toei Animation and Studio Deen, written by Fudeyasu and character designed by Tadano, was released in June 2023, with the first film on the 9th, and the second film on the 30th. The films covered the Stars arc of the manga. The main theme for both films are "Moon Flower", performed by Daoko, while the opening themes are "Moonlight Legend" by Sailor5Guardians (first film), and "Sailor Star Song" by Nana Mizuki, Marina Inoue, Saori Hayami and Ayane Sakura (as Sailor Kakyuu and Sailor Starlights respectively) (second film).

== Series overview ==
No.	Season	Episodes	Originally aired/release date		Direction
No.	Season	Episodes	First aired	Last aired	Direction
1	Season 1: Dark Kingdom	14	July 5, 2014	January 17, 2015	Munehisa Sakai
2	Season 2: Black Moon	12	February 7, 2015	July 18, 2015	Munehisa Sakai
3	Season 3: Death Busters	13	April 4, 2016	June 27, 2016	Chiaki Kon
No.	Films	No. of films	Part 1	Part 2	Direction
4	Sailor Moon Eternal	2	January 8, 2021	February 11, 2021	Chiaki Kon
5	Sailor Moon Cosmos	2	June 9, 2023	June 30, 2023	Tomoya Takahashi
Total		39 + 4	July 5, 2014	June 30, 2023	-

== Episode list ==
=== Season 1: Dark Kingdom (2014) ===
No.	Title	Direction	Screenplay	Storyboard	Animation direction	Original release date (Niconico streaming)	English release date
1	"Usagi -Sailor Moon-"; Transliteration: "Usagi -Sērā Mūn-" (Japanese: うさぎ -SAILOR MOON-)	Munehisa Sakai	Yūji Kobayashi	Munehisa Sakai	Kozue Komatsu; Yukie Sakō (Chief)	July 5, 2014	November 20, 2015
While running to Juban Public Middle School, 14-year-old Usagi Tsukino briefly encounters a cat with a crescent-shaped bald patch on its forehead after tripping over it. Elsewhere, a shadowy man named Jadeite creates a woman out of dirt and orders her to steal a "Legendary Silver Crystal". Usagi and her friend Naru Osaka visit her mother's jewelry store, which is undergoing a sudden sale. After a brief encounter with a man wearing a tuxedo, the cat appears again, revealing her ability to speak and introducing herself as Luna. Luna gives Usagi a brooch that allows her to transform into a Sailor Guardian. After transforming, Usagi hears a plea from Naru. Naru's mother had been replaced by a monster named Morga who was using the jewelry family business to drain energy from those who bought them. Calling herself "Sailor Moon", Usagi confronts Morga. With encouragement from the tuxedo-wearing stranger, Usagi kills Morga using her Moon Tiara Boomerang. As Usagi sees off the stranger, who introduces himself as Tuxedo Mask, while Jadeite watches over her actions.
2	"Ami -Sailor Mercury-"; Transliteration: "Ami -Sērā Mākyurī-" (Japanese: 亜美 -SAILOR MERCURY-)	Hiroyuki Satō	Yūji Kobayashi	Naotoshi Shida	Miho Tanaka, Yumiko Ishii; Yukie Sakō (Chief)	July 19, 2014	November 20, 2015
Ami Mizuno is a particularly gifted student at Juban Public Middle School. Luna feels that Ami has the potential to become a Sailor Guardian. The next day, Luna makes an opportunity for Usagi and Ami to befriend each other after school. The two go to Game Center Crown arcade, and they win two pens from the Sailor V arcade game machine. Afterward, Ami goes to the Crystal Seminar, unaware that they have drained their energy as one of Jadeite's plans. Usagi and Luna look into the disk Ami received from the Crystal Seminar and realize that it is a hypnotizing program tricking people into finding information on the Legendary Silver Crystal. Usagi uses the pen she received from the arcade machine to disguise herself as a doctor. She sneaks into the Crystal Seminar to rescue Ami but is overpowered by a monster. This causes Ami to snap out of her trance and uses the pen she received from the arcade to transform into a new Sailor Guardian known as Sailor Mercury and assists Sailor Moon in defeating the monster.
3	"Rei -Sailor Mars-"; Transliteration: "Rei -Sērā Māzu-" (Japanese: レイ -SAILOR MARS-)	Yōko Ikeda	Yūji Kobayashi	Yōko Ikeda	Hiromi Ishigami, Kozue Komatsu; Yukie Sakō (Chief)	August 2, 2014	November 27, 2015
The leader of the Dark Kingdom, Queen Beryl, calls out Jadeite for his two previous failures. She reveals to him and two other dark kings named Nephrite and Zoisite that the Legendary Silver Crystal is said to contain immense power. Meanwhile, Usagi meets a shrine maiden named Rei Hino. They soon realize that a girl has disappeared. They assume that it is connected to a rumor about a "Demon 6:00 P.M. Bus" that is said to spirit people away. While returning to the Hikawa Shrine, Usagi encounters the stranger once again. He reveals his name as Mamoru Chiba. As Rei laments living alone due to her mysterious powers, she sees a vision of Usagi being captured and rushes out. Jadeite captures Rei and takes her inside the Demon Bus. Usagi and Ami enter the portal, but soon realize it is a trap. When Rei attempts to stop Jadeite from using his ice powers to freeze Ami and Usagi, she awakens her own powers and transforms into Sailor Mars. After Usagi launches one final Moon Tiara Boomerang attack to trap Jadeite, Rei overpowers Jadeite's ice abilities with her own flames, forcing him to flee. As the missing children are safely returned to their families, a mysterious chest is flown into Japan.
4	"Masquerade Dance Party"; Transliteration: "Masukarēdo -Kamen Butōkai-" (Japanese: Masquerade -仮面舞踏会-)	Hiroyuki Satō	Mutsumi Itō	Hiroyuki Satō	Yasuhiro Namatame, Ken Ueno; Yukie Sakō (Chief)	August 16, 2014	December 4, 2015
Luna overhears Usagi's classmates talk about how a princess from the kingdom of D will be exhibiting a secret treasure during a dinner party. Luna believes it to be related to the Moon Princess and the Legendary Silver Crystal. Usagi disguises herself, Ami, and Rei as princesses to sneak into the embassy. While Usagi wanders off and ends up briefly dancing with Tuxedo Mask, Ami and Rei discover Princess D's bodyguard is actually Nephrite. His shadow possesses Princess D and has her escape with the kingdom's treasure. The Sailor Guardians confront the possessed princess. Usagi receives a new tiara in the process and uses it to blast Nephrite's shadow out of Princess D's body. After Nephrite regroups with Jadeite, Zoisite, and Kunzite, they introduce themselves as the Four Kings of Heaven before leaving. As Princess D reveals her kingdom's secret treasure, which turns out to be a diamond carving of herself, Tuxedo Mask gives a sleeping Sailor Moon a kiss. He flees after revealing to Luna that he is also searching for the Legendary Silver Crystal.
5	"Makoto -Sailor Jupiter-"; Transliteration: "Makoto -Sērā Jupitā-" (Japanese: まこと -SAILOR JUPITER-)	Takahide Ogata	Mutsumi Itō	Takahide Ogata	Naoko Kuwabara	September 6, 2014	December 11, 2015
Usagi is saved from being hit by a car by a girl wearing another school's uniform. She reveals herself to be a transfer student named Makoto Kino. Although the others in Makoto's class are too intimidated by her assumed superhuman strength to approach her, Usagi easily befriends her and takes her to the arcade. Usagi and the others hear about a bridal shop that is said to be cursed by a possessed mannequin that seduces grooms and kidnaps them. That night, Tuxedo Mask appears before Usagi. He leads her and the others to Makoto as she is cornered by Motoki Furuhata, who has been possessed by the "cursed bride" monster commanded by Nephrite. However, Makoto awakens her powers as Sailor Jupiter and defeats Nephrite and his monster. With Makoto joining the Sailor Guardians, Luna gives a new magical item known as the Moon Stick to Usagi, assigning her the leader of the Sailor Guardians.
6	"Tuxedo Mask"; Transliteration: "Takishīdo Kamen -Takushīdo Masuku-" (Japanese: タキシード仮面 -TUXEDO MASK-)	Yōko Ikeda	Yūji Kobayashi	Yoshio Suzuki, Shigeyasu Yamauchi	Miho Tanaka; Yukie Sakō (Chief)	September 20, 2014	December 18, 2015
Tuxedo Mask announces that he has committed various crimes in search of the Legendary Silver Crystal to discover information. Usagi hears a voice from the Sailor V arcade game. Zoisite uses the media to hypnotize citizens into searching for the Legendary Silver Crystal. Luna takes the girls to her secret base underneath the arcade and manages to locate the source of the controlling signal. Usagi runs off on her own when Luna implies it may be Tuxedo Mask's doing. As the other Sailor Guardians confront Zoisite, Usagi comes across Tuxedo Mask. He apologizes for things turning out like this and states that he desires to search for the Legendary Silver Crystal despite lacking any special power of his own. After Zoisite overpowers the Sailor Guardians with his attacks, Queen Beryl arrives and prepares to turn the Earth into part of the Dark Kingdom, but Usagi uses the Moon Stick's Moon Healing Escalation technique to critically damage Zoisite, forcing him and Queen Beryl to flee. Usagi restores the citizens to normal. After exhausting her energy, Usagi wakes up the next day in Mamoru's apartment. Usagi learns Mamoru's true identity as Tuxedo Mask, who already knows Usagi is Sailor Moon.
7	"Mamoru Chiba -Tuxedo Mask-"; Transliteration: "Chiba Mamoru -Takishīdo Masuku-" (Japanese: 地場衛 -TUXEDO MASK-)	Narumi Kuroda	Mutsumi Itō	Narumi Kuroda	Paul Año-nuevo, Aries Nario; Kozue Komatsu (Chief)	October 4, 2014	December 25, 2015
Mamoru explains to Usagi that he needs the Legendary Silver Crystal to regain his memories, which he lost in a car accident that killed his parents. He asks her to keep his identity a secret. Meanwhile, Queen Beryl meets with her master, Queen Metalia. Queen Beryl recalls when she first released her from the seal the Sailor Guardians previously placed upon her. Beryl then dispatches Zoisite once again to steal the Legendary Silver Crystal. As Usagi and the others do some research on Sailor V, they soon discover that a DVD rental shop set up by Zoisite is brainwashing citizens into searching for Sailor Moon. After Usagi uses her Moon Healing Escalation to cure the brainwashed citizens, she is attacked by Zoisite. Mamoru rescues Usagi. Zoisite singlehandedly knocks out Mamoru. Usagi is saved from certain death by Sailor V and her white cat companion named Artemis.
8	"Minako -Sailor V-"; Transliteration: "Minako -Sērā Bui–" (Japanese: 美奈子 -SAILOR V-)	Hiroyuki Satō	Yūji Kobayashi	Akira Shigino	Hiroshi Shimizu; Kozue Komatsu (Chief)	October 18, 2014	January 1, 2016
As Artemis says that Sailor V is Princess Serenity of the Moon Kingdom, Usagi's tiara suddenly changes shape and shows her a brief glimpse of a forgotten memory. After both Zoisite and Mamoru retreat, Sailor V introduces herself as Minako Aino. She explains about the Dark Kingdom's ambitions to gather energy from innocent people and conquer Earth and her mission to seal Queen Metalia once again. After having a dream about a man named Endymion, Usagi runs into Mamoru. He offers to trade Usagi's lost handkerchief for the return of his pocket watch some time. Artemis reveals to Luna that she had some of her own memories sealed. Later that night, Kunzite demands that Minako bring the Legendary Silver Crystal to him alone or else everyone in Tokyo will be killed. The other Sailor Guardians soon catch on and join Minako in fighting against Kunzite. When he launches an attack at everyone, Mamoru steps in to take the hit and protect Usagi.
9	"Serenity -Princess-"; Transliteration: "Sereniti -Purinsesu-" (Japanese: セレニティ -PRINCESS-)	Kumiko Habara	Mutsumi Itō	Naotoshi Shida	Momoko Makiuchi; Kozue Komatsu (Chief)	November 1, 2014	January 8, 2016
In his dying moments, Mamoru comes to realize that his true identity is Endymion. Usagi's sorrow over Mamoru's death transforms her into the true Serenity. She regains memories of her past life in the process and shows how she fell in love with Endymion despite there being laws against people from the Earth and Moon seeing each other. When the Earth Kingdom attacked Silver Millennium, Endymion sacrificed himself to protect Serenity. Usagi's tears bring forth the Legendary Silver Crystal and that power drips into Mamoru's body. Queen Beryl arrives, and she and Kunzite take Mamoru back to the Dark Kingdom. Afterward, Minako reveals she is actually Sailor Venus, the true leader of the Sailor Guardians, while Artemis shows the other Sailor Guardians their past lives. In order to locate the Dark Kingdom where Mamoru is being held, all of the Sailor Guardians decide to travel to the Moon and learn the whole truth.
10	"Moon"; Transliteration: "Mūn –Tsuki–" (Japanese: Moon –月–)	Masato Mitsuka	Yūji Kobayashi	Takahide Ogata	Akira Takahashi; Kozue Komatsu (Chief)	November 15, 2014	January 15, 2016
Usagi and the others land on the Moon, and they are greeted by a hologram of Queen Serenity. The Queen shows them their past lives in Silver Millennium. She assures Usagi that Mamoru is still alive as she had willed the Legendary Silver Crystal to save him. She asks Usagi to think about the true power of the Legendary Silver Crystal before her time runs out. Meanwhile, the Four Dark Kings learn that they were once righteous knights who served under Endymion in their past lives. However, they are discovered by Queen Beryl and once again put under her control. Beryl sends them to Earth to freeze Tokyo and obtain the Legendary Silver Crystal from Usagi. Recognizing the four knights' true identities, Minako and the other Sailor Guardians combine their powers into the Sailor Planet Attack in order to try and free the knights from Beryl's control but fail. Beryl uses her power to put Mamoru under her control too and sends him to kill Usagi.
11	"Reunion -Endymion-"; Transliteration: "Saikai -Endimion-" (Japanese: 再会 -ENDYMION-)	Miho Hirayama	Mutsumi Ito	Yoshihide Yuzumi	Miho Tanaka; Kozue Komatsu (Chief)	December 6, 2014	January 22, 2016
Usagi and the others try out the sword they obtained from the Moon. Usagi sneaks out and discovers someone strongly resembling Mamoru. Usagi is unaware it is actually Mamoru under Queen Beryl's control. He has used hypnotism to make himself Motoki's friend. Makoto attempts to figure out his true identity. She is hypnotized into leading the others to the command center and drawing out Usagi and the Legendary Silver Crystal. At the command center, the Sailor Guardians are confronted by Queen Beryl and the brainwashed Mamoru.
12	"Enemy -Queen Metalia-"; Transliteration: "Teki -Kuin Metaria-" (Japanese: 敵 -QUEEN METARIA-)	Hiroyuki Satō	Yūji Kobayashi	Naotoshi Shida	Paul Año-nuevo; Kozue Komatsu (Chief)	December 20, 2014	January 29, 2016
Queen Beryl states that Mamoru had died and has been resurrected as the strongest warrior of the Dark Kingdom. As Ami takes everyone to an alternate dimension to protect the command center, Minako explains to the others how Queen Metalia is the one controlling Beryl. In Beryl's previous life, she was in love with Endymion but killed him out of jealousy. Minako manages to call forth the holy sword and Usagi manages to break the necklace that sends Metalia's power to Beryl, destroying the latter in the process. Afterward, Metalia has Mamoru steal the holy sword. This forces Usagi to chase after him through a portal taking them to the North Pole. As Usagi confronts Mamoru, who has the power of Queen Metalia behind him, the other four Sailor Guardians end up having to confront the Four Dark Kings in order to reach her. The Sailor Guardians manage to purify the Four Dark Kings and remind them of their true purpose, but Metalia kills the four kings. Learning from Luna that a piece of the Legendary Silver Crystal is inside Mamoru's body, Usagi fails to purify him with the Moon Healing Escalation. Usagi strikes Mamoru with the holy sword before stabbing herself with it.
13	"Final Battle -Reincarnation-"; Transliteration: "Kessen -Riinkānēshon-" (Japanese: 決戦 -REINCARNATION-)	Yukio Kaizawa	Mutsumi Itō	Yukio Kaizawa	Yoshiyuki Ishikawa; Kozue Komatsu (Chief)	January 3, 2015	February 5, 2016
With Usagi and Mamoru's death, the Legendary Silver Crystal takes its true form. Mamoru and Usagi are sucked in by Queen Metalia. The other Sailor Guardians attempt to fight in Usagi's place, to no avail. Metalia uses the power of the Legendary Silver Crystal to spread her evil all over Earth. Meanwhile, Luna has Artemis take her to the command crystal to ask for Queen Serenity's help. Despite the seemingly hopeless situation, the other Sailor Guardians sense that Usagi is still alive and use their own life force to awaken her. She survived her suicide attempt thanks to Mamoru's pocket watch. Using the Legendary Silver Crystal's power, Usagi breaks free from Metalia's grasp. She is relieved to find Mamoru is still alive. Usagi struggles to seal Metalia by herself. The spirits of the Four Dark Kings, whose gems had protected Mamoru from the holy sword, inform Mamoru of Metalia's weak point. This allows Mamoru to give Usagi the courage to bring out the Legendary Silver Crystal's true form as the Moon Stick.
14	"Conclusion and Commencement -Petite Étrangère- (Note: "Petite Étrangère" translates to "[female] Little Foreigner".)"; Transliteration: "Shūketsu Soshite Hajimari -Puchit Etoranjēru-" (Japanese: 終結 そして 始まり -PETITE ÉTRANGÈRE-)	Munehisa Sakai	Yūji Kobayashi	Munehisa Sakai	Akira Takahashi; Kozue Komatsu (Chief)	January 17, 2015	February 12, 2016
As Usagi tries to use the strength of her heart to overpower Queen Metalia, the power of the other Sailor Guardians restores the Crystal Tower on the Moon. Luna uses the Crystal Tower to grant Usagi the power of the Moon. Using this power, Usagi manages to destroy Queen Metalia with the Moon Stick. This shatters her own transformation brooch in the process and restores the Silver Millennium to its former glory. After being awakened by a kiss from Mamoru, Usagi is summoned by Luna to the Moon. Usagi is told she will become the new queen. However, Usagi states that she wants to return to living on Earth with her friends and lover. Queen Serenity gives her a new transformation brooch. This allows Usagi to become Sailor Moon once more and use Moon Healing Escalation to restore the planet to normal and bring back her friends. As the girls return to their peaceful everyday lives, Usagi and Mamoru's private time is suddenly interrupted when a pink-haired girl, by the nickname of Chibiusa, suddenly falls out from a portal in the sky. The girl is also named Usagi. The young girl points a gun at Usagi. She demands that she will give her the Legendary Silver Crystal.

=== Season 2: Black Moon (2015) ===
No. overall	No. in season	Title	Direction	Screenplay	Storyboard	Animation direction	Original release date (Niconico streaming)	English release date
15	1	"Infiltration -Sailor Mars-"; Transliteration: "Shinnyū -Sērā Māzu–" (Japanese: 侵入 -SAILOR MARS-)	Naoyuki Itō	Mutsumi Itō	Naoyuki Itō	Miho Tanaka; Kozue Komatsu (Chief)	February 7, 2015	February 19, 2016
Mamoru stops the smaller Usagi, who only had a fake gun. She is subsequently referred to as "Chibiusa". Another evil group, the Black Moon Clan, seeks to target the Legendary Silver Crystal, which could stand in the way of their plans. Upon being taken back to Usagi's house, Chibiusa hypnotizes Usagi's family into letting her stay with them. Meanwhile, Rei helps out with her school's Supernatural Research Club for a school fair, and learns about alleged incidents of people being abducted or spontaneously combusting. Rei's fortune telling booth is challenged by another fortune teller, Koan Kurozuki, who is later revealed to be one of the Specter Sisters, servants of Black Moon. As the Sailor Guardians confront her, Koan traps Rei in an inextinguishable blue flame. Though Usagi destroys Koan, the blue flames remain unbroken, and Koan's leader Rubeus captures Rei and takes her away.
16	2	"Abduction -Sailor Mercury-"; Transliteration: "Yūkai -Sērā Mākyurī-" (Japanese: 誘拐 -SAILOR MERCURY-)	Yōko Ikeda	Yūji Kobayashi	Yōko Ikeda	Paul Año-Nuevo; Kozue Komatsu (Chief)	February 21, 2015	February 26, 2016
Usagi thinks Chibiusa knows who captured Rei, while Mamoru tries to get to know Chibiusa better. Chibiusa wants Usagi to rescue her mother. The next of the Specter Sisters, Berthier, challenges Ami to a chess match, demanding from Ami to give up Chibiusa should she win. Ami wins the match; however, she is caught in Berthier's water sphere. Usagi destroys Berthier, but Rubeus captures Ami and takes her away.
17	3	"Secret -Sailor Jupiter-"; Transliteration: "Himitsu -Sērā Jupitā–" (Japanese: 秘密 -SAILOR JUPITER-)	Kumiko Habara	Mutsumi Itō	Kazuhisa Takenouchi	Momoko Makiuchi; Kozue Komatsu (Chief)	March 7, 2015	March 4, 2016
The Sailor Guardians realize Chibiusa is Black Moon's true target. Asanuma, an underclassman of Makoto, overhears a curious conversation between Usagi, Mamoru, and Luna. The oldest of the Specter Sisters, Petz, spreads a virus across the city and sends an army of Droids to replace everyone in their weakness. As Makoto is weakened by the virus, Asanuma looks after her, and learns her true identity as Sailor Jupiter. Despite Usagi managing to defeat Petz, Makoto is caught by her own thunder and captured by Rubeus.
18	4	"Invasion -Sailor Venus-"; Transliteration: "Shinryaku -Sērā Vīnasu-" (Japanese: 侵略 -SAILOR VENUS-)	Yukihiko Nakao	Yūji Kobayashi	Munehisa Sakai, Yoshiko Mikami	Akira Takahashi; Kozue Komatsu (Chief)	March 21, 2015	March 11, 2016
Artemis analyzes one of Petz's Malefic Black Crystal earrings, of which Chibiusa is terrified. Rubeus sends the fourth and final Specter Sister, Calaveras. Calaveras uses her medium powers to channel Rubeus and call upon the powers of her fallen sisters by possessing others. While Minako faces Calaveras, Rubeus confronts Usagi and Chibiusa, but they are saved by Mamoru. Calaveras manages to capture Minako, but Usagi defeats her and manages to save Minako. Chibiusa explains that she comes from 30th century Earth to seek Usagi's help in saving her time.
19	5	"Time Warp -Sailor Pluto-"; Transliteration: "Taimu Wāpu -Sērā Purūto-" (Japanese: タイム・ワープ -SAILOR PLUTO-)	Yukio Kaizawa	Mutsumi Itō	Yukio Kaizawa	Yoshiyuki Ichikawa; Kozue Komatsu (Chief)	April 4, 2015	March 18, 2016
Usagi and the others decide to go to the future to rescue the other Sailor Guardians and to help Chibiusa. Chibiusa uses her space-time key to open up the doorway to the future. They become separated from Chibiusa and wound up across a door Luna has recalled from a dream. The Guardian of Time, Sailor Pluto, guards this door. Pluto fights them until Chibiusa intervenes. Pluto grants Usagi and the others safe passage to the 30th century Earth. They see a large black crystal has robbed energy from all of Crystal Tokyo's citizens. Before they can reach the Crystal Tokyo Palace, the Boule Brothers, also servants of Black Moon, confront them and trap everyone inside a magnetic field from which they cannot escape, but are later defeated by Mamoru. Usagi and the others reach the palace. They come across Chibiusa's mother, Neo Queen Serenity, who is frozen in the crystals. Another Tuxedo Mask greets Usagi and the others.
20	6	"Crystal Tokyo -King Endymion-"; Transliteration: "Kurisutaru Tōkyō -Kingu Endimion–" (Japanese: クリスタル・トーキョー -KING ENDYMION-)	Hideki Hiroshima	Yūji Kobayashi	Kazuhisa Takenouchi	Miho Tanaka; Kozue Komatsu (Chief)	April 18, 2015	March 25, 2016
The future Tuxedo Mask appears as a projection of his soul. He reveals himself as King Endymion who is Mamoru's future self, Neo Queen Serenity is Usagi's future self, and Chibiusa is their daughter. King Endymion also explains what happened to everyone in the future, the origins of Black Moon, and where the captured Sailor Guardians may be. Pluto gives Usagi a key so that they can freely travel between the past and the future Earth, and Usagi and the others return to their time. However, Chibiusa pays a visit to the future on her own, and is targeted by Black Moon's Esmeraude. Mamoru destroys Esmeraude, but the Clan's leader Prince Demande suddenly appears and captures Usagi.
21	7	"Complication -Nemesis-"; Transliteration: "Sakusō -Nemeshisu-" (Japanese: 錯綜 -NEMESIS-)	Hiroyuki Satō	Yūji Kobayashi	Hiroyuki Satō	Keiko Iwata, Paul Año-Nuevo; Kozue Komatsu (Chief)	May 2, 2015	April 1, 2016
Usagi awakens in Planet Nemesis, Black Moon's hideout. Prince Demande explains Black Moon's past as well as his intentions for Usagi's time. King Endymion states that Chibiusa cannot utilize the power of the Legendary Silver Crystal, and deduces that members of Black Moon are descendants of Death Phantom, an evil that Neo Queen Serenity sealed away on Nemesis long ago. Unable to transform due to Nemesis' influence, Usagi decides to cast aside her doubts and focus on her desire to protect others. Usagi's voice manages to awaken Ami, Rei, and Makoto before they are once again restrained by Demande. Meanwhile, Chibiusa struggles with thoughts of how her actions affected everyone and starts feeling lonely and confused. She ends up wandering into Wiseman's clutches and falls under his influence.
22	8	"Hidden Agenda -Nemesis-"; Transliteration: "Omowaku -Nemeshisu-" (Japanese: 思惑 -NEMESIS-)	Nozomu Shishido	Yūji Kobayashi	Yukio Kaizawa	Akira Takahashi; Kozue Komatsu (Chief)	May 16, 2015	April 8, 2016
Usagi is still stuck on Nemesis, but as she is about to be killed by Saphir and two of his droids, she receives strong will power, which prevents Saphir from stabbing her and destroys his two droids. Usagi transforms into Sailor Moon and finds Ami, Rei, and Makoto, who are now able to transform and escape their imprisonment. They reach Nemesis' reactor, where they face Demande, Saphir, and Rubeus. The Legendary Silver Crystal's power causes Nemesis' reactor to melt down. Rubeus tries to escape to safety, but Wiseman kills him. The Sailor Guardians escape to the door of Time and Space. Usagi learns that Mamoru ran after Chibiusa. Neither one has a space-time key.
23	9	"Covert Maneuvers -Wiseman-"; Transliteration: "An'yaku -Waizuman-" (Japanese: 暗躍 -WISEMAN-)	Yukihiko Nakao	Yūji Kobayashi	Yukihiko Nakao	Paul Año-Nuevo; Kozue Komatsu (Chief)	June 6, 2015	April 15, 2016
While Usagi and her friends try to go out into the storm to look for Mamoru and Chibiusa, a new Black Moon member introduces herself as Black Lady to Prince Demande and Saphir. After she passes out in the storm, Usagi wakes up in the 20th century, but she and the Sailor Guardians return to the future. Black Lady enters the crystal palace and is about to attack Usagi, but Neo Queen Serenity, still inside the Silver Crystal, sends a powerful light that causes Black Lady to be locked out of the palace. The five Sailor Guardians prepare to fight Black Lady and Wiseman.
24	10	"Attack -Black Lady-"; Transliteration: "Kōgeki -Burakku Redi-" (Japanese: 攻撃 -BLACK LADY-)	Miho Hirayama	Mutsumi Ito	Kazuhisa Takenouchi	Miho Tanaka; Kozue Komatsu (Chief)	June 20, 2015	April 22, 2016
Black Lady summons Saphir and Prince Demande to subdue the Sailor Guardians, and reveals Mamoru is under her control. Mamoru attacks Usagi, while Wiseman orders Black Lady to summon another Black Crystal. Demande, who had kept a lucid mind all along, objects to the summoning of another Black Crystal because this would destroy the 30th century Earth. Demande is forced to kill his brother who attacks him by orders of Black Lady, and seemingly defeats Wiseman as well. It is revealed that Wiseman's real identity is the planet Nemesis itself, which descends upon the palace. Black Lady manages to obtain both the past and present Legendary Silver Crystals, but Demande steals them from Black Lady just as Sailor Pluto arrives to help. Demande attempts to have both Legendary Silver Crystals touch each other, which would result in the destruction of the Earth.
25	11	"Showdown -Death Phantom-"; Transliteration: "Taiketsu -Desu Fantomu-" (Japanese: 対決 -DEATH PHANTOM-)	Nozomu Shishido	Yūji Kobayashi	Munehisa Sakai	Yoshiyuki Ichikawa, Yukie Sakō; Kozue Komatsu (Chief)	July 4, 2015	April 29, 2016
Sailor Pluto stops time to prevent Prince Demande from attempting to have the past and present Legendary Silver Crystals to touch each other. She unfreezes everyone but Demande. Pluto breaks Black Lady's control over Mamoru. Usagi retrieves the past and present Legendary Silver Crystals from Demande. Pluto recalls Queen Serenity telling her that stopping time will result in her own death. Pluto's death unfreezes time and breaks Nemesis' control over Black Lady, where she becomes Chibiusa again. Chibiusa transforms into a Sailor Guardian: Sailor Chibi Moon. Prince Demand dies protecting Usagi from Nemesis, who reveals to be Death Phantom, who has merged his spirit with the planet to become one entity. Just as Nemesis engulfs the future Earth, the Sailor Guardians, Mamoru, and King Endymion prepare for their final battle against the Death Phantom.
26	12	"Replay -Never Ending-"; Transliteration: "Saisei -Nebā Endingu-" (Japanese: 再生 -NEVER ENDING-)	Munehisa Sakai	Yūji Kobayashi	Munehisa Sakai	Akira Takahashi, Yukie Sakō	July 18, 2015	May 6, 2016
Usagi, Death Phantom, and later Mamoru vanish to an unknown place, while the Sailor Guardians and King Endymion return to Crystal Tokyo. Neo Queen Serenity awakens from her longtime slumber inside the palace due to Chibiusa accepting her destiny as a princess of the future Moon Kingdom and as a Sailor Guardian. Usagi and Mamoru hug and kiss before Chibiusa arrives to help them. Usagi and Chibiusa both use the Moon Princess Halation attack to defeat the Death Phantom successfully. Once the Death Phantom is defeated, Neo Queen Serenity bestows the Sailor Guardians new transformations and planet powers. Neo Queen Serenity uses her powers to restore the future Earth and all its residents back to normal. Before Usagi leaves Crystal Tokyo, she meets and speaks to her future self, Neo Queen Serenity, face to face. In the past, Chibiusa, Usagi and Mamoru go to the water fountain to where they first met and say a goodbye to Chibiusa, who must return to the future. Mamoru and Usagi were about to kiss before Chibiusa teleported back to the past. Chibiusa gives Mamoru a letter from her mother, which says Chibiusa has returned so that they can train and spend more time with her.

=== Season 3: Death Busters (2016) ===
No. overall	No. in season	Title	Direction	Screenplay	Storyboard	Animation direction	Original release date (Tokyo MX broadcast)	English release date
27	1	"Infinity 1 Premonition - Part 1"; Transliteration: "Mugen Ichi Yokan - Zenpen" (Japanese: 無限1 予感・前編)	Chiaki Kon	Yūji Kobayashi	Chiaki Kon	Akira Takahashi	April 4, 2016	October 27, 2017
A malevolent inter-dimensional being known as Master Pharaoh 90 plans to overtake Earth and instructs a woman named Kaolinite to destroy "the light of destruction" which he regard as a threat to them. At the same time, Rei, Mamoru, and a teenage girl have a disturbing vision about three shadowed Sailor Guardians, which is accompanied by a voice that calls for the girl's awakening and "the beginning of doom". A news report airs concerning students being transformed into monsters in a process called "Reversion". Usagi and her friends meet a famous auto racer named Haruka Tenoh, while Mamoru encounters a prominent violinist named Michiru Kaioh. Makoto and Minako recognize their school uniforms from the prestigious Mugen Academy, a high school attended by elite students. Suddenly, another student from Mugen Academy is transformed into a monster in front of the Sailor Guardians, who transform and use their powers to bring her back to normal. Haruka and Michiru are seen observing the altercation from afar. Usagi and her friends later learn that all victims of the "Reversion" so far have been Mugen Academy students and decide to investigate the school.
28	2	"Infinity 1 Premonition - Part 2"; Transliteration: "Mugen Ichi Yokan - Kōhen" (Japanese: 無限1 予感・後編)	Nozomu Shishido	Yūji Kobayashi	Yo Hong	Yukiko Akiyama; Akira Takahashi (Chief)	April 11, 2016	October 27, 2017
Mamoru escorts Chibiusa and her friends to an amusement park near Mugen Academy. Kaolinite instructs her servants, the Witches 5, to find and eliminate the Sailor Guardians. Usagi and her friends investigate Mugen Academy, but they encounter Haruka and Michiru who tell them not to get in their way. Chibiusa finds a girl crouching on the ground in pain and attempts to help her when they are attacked by a Daimon that the Witches created from a cat. The Sailor Guardians fight the creature off and restore the possessed cat to its normal form. As Chibiusa checks on the girl to make sure she was not hurt, the girl instead points out the injury on Chibiusa's arm. Usagi turns quickly sensing someone watching, and everyone sees two figures of unfamiliar Sailor Guardians silhouetted in the moonlight.
29	3	"Infinity 2 Ripples"; Transliteration: "Mugen Ni Hamon" (Japanese: 無限2 波紋)	Hayao Yashiro	Yūji Kobayashi	Hayao Yashiro	Paul Año-Nuevo; Akira Takahashi (Chief)	April 18, 2016	October 27, 2017
As the two unknown Sailor Guardians leave, the girl Chibiusa saved uses a mysterious power to heal her wound. She introduces herself as Hotaru Tomoe. Shortly afterwards, Hotaru's father, Professor Souichi Tomoe, presents her with an amulet he says will ease her pain. Kaolinite receives the same omen as Hotaru, Mamoru, and Rei regarding the gathering of three talismans. Usagi notices Haruka and Michiru resemble the two unidentified Sailor Guardians. Rei leaves for the mountains to undergo purification training and monitor activities held there by Mugen Academy, but she is unexpectedly joined by her friends to celebrate her birthday. Eudial of the Witches 5 holds a ceremony involving several students to have them offer their souls or "Hostes" to Master Pharaoh 90, only to be confronted by the Sailor Guardians and killed by Usagi. Afterwards, she sees one of the unknown Sailor Guardians fleeing the scene and rushes after her. Just when Usagi thought she had lost her, the unknown Sailor Guardian appears behind her and warns her that she and her friends should not interfere before suddenly kissing Usagi.
30	4	"Infinity 3 Two New Soldiers"; Transliteration: "Mugen San Futari Nyū Sorujāzu" (Japanese: 無限3 2人 NEW SOLDIERS)	Daisuke Kurose	Yūji Kobayashi	Yo Hong	Etsushi Mori, Norifumi Okuno, Yuriko Ikehara; Akira Takahashi (Chief)	April 25, 2016	October 27, 2017
Usagi realizes that the Sailor Guardian she met was in fact, Haruka. The Sailor Guardians, Mamoru, and Hotaru have the same ominous dream regarding the three talismans and the city being destroyed. Mimete, the second of the Witches 5, plans to gather hosts for Pharaoh 90 disguised under her alias as Mugen Academy prefect and pop idol, Mimi Hanyu. Chibiusa visits Hotaru at her home. When Hotaru suddenly collapses, Chibiusa uses her Legendary Silver Crystal to ease her pain. On her way home, Haruka and Michiru offer Chibiusa a ride in one of their helicopters. During their conversation, Michiru reveals to Chibiusa that her hand mirror is a talisman. Usagi and her friends attend a concert by Michiru, while Minako sneaks into Mimi Hanyu's concert. Mimete casts a spell on the crowd, but Minako confronts Mimete, who summons three Daimons to attack her. Usagi and the others join the battle and destroy each of the monsters. Mimete is killed by the two mysterious Sailor Guardians, who introduce themselves as Sailor Neptune and Sailor Uranus.
31	5	"Infinity 4 Haruka & Michiru, Sailor Uranus & Sailor Neptune"; Transliteration: "Mugen Yon Sērā Uranusu Ten'nō Haruka Sērā Nepuchūn Kaiō Michiru" (Japanese: 無限4 SAILOR URANUS 天王はるか SAILOR NEPTUNE 海王みちる)	Nozomu Shishido	Yūji Kobayashi	Nozomu Shishido	Ayaka Shimoji, Paul Año-Nuevo; Akira Takahashi (Chief)	May 2, 2016	October 27, 2017
Usagi and the others question Sailors Uranus and Neptune about their objectives, only for Uranus to explain that they are not her allies as they attack the Sailor Guardians before leaving. Luna reveals that the two of them were solitary Sailor Guardians who were assigned to protect Silver Millennium from afar and that they were not supposed to interact with them. Mamoru and Usagi assist Chibiusa on her school project, which is a replica of the "Legendary Holy Grail". After the replica is completed, Usagi and Mamoru both confess to feelings of jealousy regarding their interactions with Haruka and Michiru and reconcile. Some time later, Ami decides to take the test for the Mugen Preparatory School in order to meet Yui Bido, a genius Mugen Academy prefect who is actually Viluy of the Witches 5, attacking Ami upon realizing she is a Sailor Guardian. Ami is joined by her friends, but their fight is interrupted by Haruka and Michiru. Haruka reveals her talisman, the Space Sword, and uses it to finish Viluy. Meanwhile, at Motoki and Reika's university, a physics student resembling Sailor Pluto appears and introduces herself as Setsuna Meioh.
32	6	"Infinity 5 Setsuna, Sailor Pluto"; Transliteration: "Mugen Go Sērā Purūto Meiō Setsuna" (Japanese: 無限5 SAILOR PLUTO 冥王せつな)	Hideyo Yamamoto	Yūji Kobayashi	Tomohiro Furukawa	Aya Nakanishi, Yukie Takayama; Akira Takahashi (Chief)	May 9, 2016	October 27, 2017
Setsuna Meioh investigates disruptions in the space time. Master Pharaoh 90 summons Professor Tomoe and Kaolinite, demanding more Hostes to prolong the Taioron Crystal as they consider using Sailor Moon's Legendary Moon Crystal in order to replenish its energy. Kaolinite calls for Ruru Teruno or rather Tellu from the Witches 5 to gather Hostes for her. Makoto hears from a classmate about Tellun, a plant artificially created in Mugen Academy that does not require watering. Makoto decides to buy a Tellun herself. The next day, Makoto is visited by Minako at her apartment and suddenly falls asleep. She dreams about her long lost love, until she wakes up. Minako realizes that the Tellun had bloomed in an instant, which killed all the plants around it. The Sailor Guardians go to Mugen Academy's Botanical Division and are overpowered by Tellu when the newly awakened Sailor Pluto appears and destroys Tellu with the Dead Scream attack.
33	7	"Infinity 6 Three Guardians"; Transliteration: "Mugen Roku San Senshi" (Japanese: 無限6 3戦士)	Chiaki Kon	Yūji Kobayashi	Chiaki Kon	Akira Takahashi	May 16, 2016	October 27, 2017
Sailor Pluto reveals that she was revived by Neo Queen Serenity and returned from the future by her request as she, Uranus and Neptune explain their mission to Usagi, who transforms into Princess Serenity, of dealing with threats beyond the Solar System; the Death Busters being one of these threats. After learning that Mugen Academy having been closed due to the controversial disappearances, Luna convinces Chibiusa to use her friendship with Hotaru to act as a spy on Tomoe for them. Chibiusa discovers that Hotaru has some bio-mechanical parts implanted on her body and flees in fear. Soon after, a hailstorm begins and drains the Hostes of those it touches and turns them hostile. Meanwhile, Cyprine, the last of the Witches 5, carries out her mission to eliminate Haruka and is astonished to find her quarry to be a Sailor Guardian. When the other Sailor Guardians join her as well, Cyprine uses her power to manipulate the Sailor Guardians and the Outer Guardians to fight each other. Usagi, unaffected by the spell, attempts to attack Cyprine before she and her other half, Ptilol, split off as Mamoru and Chibiusa arrive to help Usagi. At Usagi's request, the three combine their powers together and summon the Legendary Holy Grail.
34	8	"Infinity 7 Transformation, Super Sailor Moon"; Transliteration: "Mugen Shichi Henshin Sūpā Sērā Mūn" (Japanese: 無限7 変身 SUPER SAILOR MOON)	Nozomu Shishido	Yūji Kobayashi	Nozomu Shishido	Hitomi Matsura, Kenji Sawada; Naoko Yamaoka (Chief)	May 23, 2016	October 27, 2017
The mighty holy powers of the legendary Holy Grail restore the other Sailor Guardians' minds as they give Usagi the power to evolve into Super Sailor Moon, as she easily obliterates Cyprine and Ptilol's spell. The Talismans unexpectedly reacted to Usagi's request, and the Outer Guardians explain that in their past lives, they were all teleported to the Moon Kingdom after Metaria was sealed and witnessed its true end at the hands of Sailor Saturn, whom their Talismans had summoned. Having been reborn, the Outer Guardians explain they intend to prevent her return by killing her reincarnation: Hotaru Tomoe. As Usagi and her friends disagree, Chibiusa rushes to Hotaru's house to check on her. But Mistress 9, the Daimon entity within Hotaru that has finally gained strength from being exposed to the future Legendary Silver Crystal, takes over her host while stealing both Chibiusa's legendary Silver Crystal of the thirtieth century and soul.
35	9	"Infinity 8 Infinite Labyrinth 1"; Transliteration: "Mugen Hachi Rabirinsu Mugen Ichi" (Japanese: 無限8「無限迷宮」1)	Yasunori Goto	Yūji Kobayashi	Yo Hong	Tomohiro Kamitani; Akira Takahashi (Chief)	May 30, 2016	October 27, 2017
While explaining that Mistress 9 is not Saturn, the Outer Guardians remain adamant that killing Hotaru is the only way to retrieve Chibiusa's soul as the girl's body is kept alive by Mamoru. Usagi and her leave for Mugen Academy, where Mistress 9 assumes her role as Pharaoh 90's right hand while ordering Kaolinite to deal with the Sailor Guardians. When Usagi and her friends storm Mugen Academy, they are attacked by the Witches 5 whom Kaolinite revived to enact their revenge. But the Witches 5 end up destroyed by the Outer Guardians, who come to their aid while admitting wanting to protect Usagi. The fully united Sailor Guardians then confront Kaolinite, who assumes her Daimon form before being destroyed by Usagi. Meanwhile, Hotaru's spirit inside Mistress 9 watches powerless as she swallows Chibiusa's Legendary Silver Crystal.
36	10	"Infinity 9 Infinite Labyrinth 2"; Transliteration: "Mugen Kyu Rabirinsu Mugen Ni" (Japanese: 無限9「無限迷宮」2)	Masashi Abe	Yūji Kobayashi	Yūki Ukai	Miho Kinjo, Kazuhiro Orichimata; Naoko Yamaoka (Chief)	June 6, 2016	October 27, 2017
Enticed by the power of Chibiusa's Legendary Silver Crystal, Master Pharaoh 90 deems it a more worthy power source as he destroys the Taioron Crystal and prepares himself for his advent. The Sailor Guardians split up to search Mugen Academy building. Usagi accompanies the Outer Guardians to the basement, where they confront Professor Tomoe as he assumes his Daimon form Germatoid. Despite knowing he is human, Usagi is ultimately forced to kill Tomoe prior to the building collapsing. As Usagi flees with the Outer Guardians, her transformation dispels as she fears for the safety of the other Sailor Guardians left behind. Master Pharaoh 90 and Mistress 9 appear before her.
37	11	"Infinity 10 Infinite–Upper Atmosphere"; Transliteration: "Mugen Jū Mugendai–Jōkū" (Japanese: 無限10 無限大―上空)	Yukio Kaizawa	Yūji Kobayashi	Yukio Kaizawa	Kumiko Kawashima, Kazuya Saito; Akira Takahashi (Chief)	June 13, 2016	October 27, 2017
Master Pharaoh 90 begins to merge with the Earth to turn it into the next Tau Ceti Star System, but the Outer Guardians project a barrier to contain him. Mistress 9 tries to rip herself out of Hotaru's body to assume her true form, only to realize that Hotaru's soul still lives inside her and is hindering her. When Mistress 9 consumes the four Sailor Guardians’ souls, Hotaru is forced to leave her body to return their souls and Chibiusa's to their bodies. Hotaru also returns the Legendary Silver Crystal to Chibiusa before ceasing to be once Mistress 9 assumes her true form with Hotaru's body destroyed in the process. As Mistress 9 begins to weakens the Outer Guardians' barrier, the reawakened Chibiusa arrives to the battle with her desire to be strong like her mother causes a second Moon Chalice to appear. Both Usagi and Chibiusa transform into their evolved Super Sailor forms and face Mistress 9.
38	12	"Infinity 11 Infinite–Judgement"; Transliteration: "Mugen Jūichi Mugendai–Shinpan" (Japanese: 無限11 無限大―審判)	Nozomu Shishido	Yūji Kobayashi	Nozomu Shishido	Ayaka Shimoji, Hisashi Nakamoto; Naoko Yamaoka (Chief)	June 20, 2016	October 27, 2017
Though Usagi and Chibiusa defeat her with a combined attack, Mistress 9 allows herself to be assimilated by a fully manifested Master Pharaoh 90 as he overpowers Sailor Guardians and Tuxedo Mask while breaking the Outer Guardians' barrier to commence his assimilation of the planet. Usagi uses the Moon Chalice with the last of her friends' energy while throwing herself into Master Pharaoh 90 in an apparent sacrifice. This causes the talismans to react, awakening Sailor Saturn from what remained of Hotaru's body. Explaining to the Outer Guardians that her role as a destroyer is necessary for renewal, Saturn proceeds to mortally wound Pharaoh 90 as he recognized her as the light from his visions. Saturn then prepares to swing her Silence Glaive down, the Outer Guardians explaining that Saturn intends to wipe out the entire planet with her weapon's motion. Panic-stricken, Super Sailor Chibi Moon calls out to Super Sailor Moon just as the Silence Glaive is sharply swung down on its edge.
39	13	"Infinity 12 Infinite–Journey"; Transliteration: "Mugen Jūni Mugendai–Tabidachi" (Japanese: 無限12 無限大―旅立ち)	Chiaki Kon	Yūji Kobayashi	Chiaki Kon	Akira Takahashi	June 27, 2016	October 27, 2017
With Sailor Saturn finally awakened within Hotaru, she brings the utter annihilation of both Pharaoh 90 and the world. Usagi liberates the power she amassed to deal a fatal blow on the already fatally damaged Master Pharaoh 90. Seeing no need to wipe out Earth as Usagi is still alive, Saturn instead intercepts Pharaoh 90 during his attempted escape back into the Tau Star System and has Sailor Pluto use her Dark Dome Close to seal them both away. When the Legendary Silver Crystal evolves all the other Sailor Guardians to their Super forms, Usagi briefly transforms into Neo Queen Serenity and uses her power from the Spiral Heart Moon Rod to restore the city. Shortly afterwards, an infant Hotaru appears, fully reborn with the spirit of Saturn once again slumbering within her, prompting the Outer Guardians deciding to care for her while bidding farewell to Usagi and the Sailor Guardians, and leave to parts unknown. Months later at the beginning of April, Usagi and her friends are now 16-year-old high school students while Mamoru enrolls into a university. The day comes for Chibiusa to return to the 30th-century Earth after having completed her Sailor Guardian training. While watching a solar eclipse with Mamoru, Usagi and Chibiusa hear the clear and mysterious sound of a bell.

== Films ==
Title	Direction	Screenplay	Storyboard	Animation direction	Original release date	English release date
Pretty Guardian Sailor Moon Eternal The Movie
Pretty Guardian Sailor Moon Eternal The Movie -Part I- Transliteration: "Gekijōban Bishōjo Senshi Sērā Mūn Etānaru Zenpen" (Japanese: 劇場版「美少女戦士セーラームーンEternal(エターナル)」 前編)	Chiaki Kon	Kazuyuki Fudeyasu	Chiaki Kon	Ayaka Shimoji, Yū Yoshiyama, Kiyoko Kametani, Mariko Emori, Hiroshi Tatezaki, Taichi Nakakuma, Emi Kojima, Masahiko Matsuo, Aya Miyajima, Asami Sodeyama, Mayumi Fukushi, Hisashi Nakamoto, Zenjirō Ukulele; Kazuko Tadano (Chief), Maki Fujii (Chief), Maki Fujioka (Chief), Yoko Kikuchi (Chief), Yuka Kudō (Chief), Yukiko Ban (Chief)	January 8, 2021	June 3, 2021
Months after the Mugen Academy incident, Usagi and Chibiusa receive a vision from a pegasus named Helios during the solar eclipse, who's looking for a maiden to break the seal of the Golden Crystal. Shortly after, the Dead Moon Circus arrives and the Amazoness Quartet: CereCere, PallaPalla, JunJun and VesVes spreads nightmare incarnations called Lemures, but prevented by Super Sailor Moon and Super Sailor Chibi Moon. The Quartet then sends the Amazon Trio: Fish Eye, Hawk's Eye, and Tiger's Eye to go after Ami, Rei and Makoto, while sending Xenotime and Zeolite to Minako, one Guardian at a time, but are bested by the newly awakened Super Sailor Guardians. Meanwhile, Mamoru is suffering from an incessant chest pain, which Helios reveals that it's due to the curse that the Dead Moon had placed on Earth and Elysion. The film covered the first half of the Dream arc from the manga.
Pretty Guardian Sailor Moon Eternal The Movie -Part II- Transliteration: "Gekijōban Bishōjo Senshi Sērā Mūn Etānaru Kōhen" (Japanese: 劇場版「美少女戦士セーラームーンEternal(エターナル)」 後編)	Chiaki Kon	Kazuyuki Fudeyasu	Chiaki Kon, Michio Fukuda, Nobuo Hikawa	Ayaka Shimoji, Tomoyo Sawada, Taichi Nakakuma, Kiyoko Kametani, Tomoko Itō, Miho Sugimoto; Maki Fujii (Chief), Yuka Kudō (Chief), Toshimitsu Kobayashi (Chief), Miki Takahara (Chief), Asako Nishida (Chief), Terumi Nishii (Chief)	February 11, 2021	June 3, 2021
The Outer Guardians, including re-awakened Sailor Saturn joins the Inner Guardians on their battle with the Dead Moon Circus. The circus ringleader Zirconia then sends suffocating fog and nightmares across Jūban, but with help from Tuxedo Mask, the Super Sailor Guardians overcome the nightmares. Super Sailor Guardians and Tuxedo Mask transport to Elysion to confront the circus master, Queen Nehelenia, who reveals that her curse on the princess led to Silver Millenium's downfall. As Nehelenia corrupts the Silver Crystal, Mamoru kisses Usagi and purifies the crystal, freeing them from the nightmares. Super Sailor Moon, with the help of nine Eternal Sailor Guardians and Tuxedo Mask's awakened Golden Crystal, transforms into Eternal Sailor Moon and destroys Nehelenia for good, returning Earth and Elysion to normal. The Amazoness Quartet are revealed to be Sailors Ceres, Pallas, Juno and Vesta, whom were forced to awaken by Nehelenia and serve her, and they promise Sailor Chibi Moon to be their guardian once they re-awakened from their eternal slumber. Back on Earth, Helios promises Chibiusa that they'll meet again someday. The film covered the latter half of the Dream arc from the manga.
Pretty Guardian Sailor Moon Cosmos The Movie
Pretty Guardian Sailor Moon Cosmos The Movie -Part I- Transliteration: "Gekijōban Bishōjo Senshi Sērā Mūn Kosumosu Zenpen" (Japanese: 劇場版「美少女戦士セーラームーンCosmos(コスモス)」 前編)	Tomoya Takahashi	Kazuyuki Fudeyasu	Tomoya Takahashi, Mamoru Kurosawa	Kiyoko Kametani, Wakako Yoshida, Marina Satō, Katsuyuki Matsubara, Seika Matsui, Tomoyo Fukada, Miho Arai, Ayaka Murakami; Keiko Iwata (Chief), Maki Fujii (Chief), Yuka Kudō (Chief), Miho Sugimoto (Chief), Asami Sodeyama (Chief), Tomoko Itō (Chief)	June 9, 2023	August 22, 2024
Months after the defeat of the Dead Moon Circus, Usagi and her friends are living their peaceful lives as ordinary high school students. Mamoru Chiba plans to head to America to study abroad, and as he bids Usagi farewell at the airport, he is suddenly killed by a mysterious Sailor Galaxia and takes his Golden Crystal afterwards. Unable to accept his death, Usagi hides her memory of that event. Moments after, the Sailor Animamates of Shadow Galactica, led by Sailor Galaxia, appears and robs eight of the Eternal Sailor Guardians' Sailor Crystals. At the same time, a trio of Sailor Guardians known as the Sailor Starlights: Sailors Star Fighter, Star Maker and Star Healer, appears to Earth from another star system in search for their princess, Kakyuu, and a mysterious girl named Chibi-Chibi appears. Determined to get the Sailor Crystals back from Galaxia, Usagi asks for Starlights and Kakyuu's assistance. The film covered the first half of the Stars arc from the manga.
Pretty Guardian Sailor Moon Cosmos The Movie -Part II- Transliteration: "Gekijōban Bishōjo Senshi Sērā Mūn Kosumosu Kōhen" (Japanese: 劇場版「美少女戦士セーラームーンCosmos(コスモス)」 後編)	Tomoya Takahashi	Kazuyuki Fudeyasu	Tomoya Takahashi, Mamoru Kurosawa, Masaki Kitamura	Kiyoko Kametani, Mayumi Fukushi, Wakako Yoshida, Aya Miyajima, Yū Yoshiyama, Marina Satō, Sachi Takahashi, Shiori Nagata, Sakurako Mitsuhashi, Miyuki Sugiwara, Mayuko Umigishi, Seika Matsui, Tomoyo Sawada, Miho Arai; Keiko Iwata (Chief), Maki Fujii (Chief), Asami Sodeyama (Chief), Natsuko Kondō (Chief), Miho Sugimoto (Chief), Yūko Inoue (Chief)	June 30, 2023	August 22, 2024
Eternal Sailor Moon, Kakyuu, Starlights and Chibi-Chibi arrives to Sagittarius Zero Star, Galaxia's home base. After Sailors Lethe and Mnemosyne are killed for their failures, Sailors Phi and Chi kill the Starlights. Eternal Sailor Chibi Moon and the Sailor Quartet arrives from the future to assists Sailor Moon, and while defeating Phi and Chi, Sailor Kakyuu is wounded in the process and dies. At the palace, Sailor Moon is then forced to battle and defeat the revived Eternal Sailor Guardians and Tuxedo Mask, and later battles Galaxia. After Galaxia throws the Sailor Crystals and Tuxedo Mask into the Galaxy Cauldron, Chaos merges with the Cauldron and plans to take the Silver Moon Crystal and rule the galaxy. As Galaxia is awed by Sailor Moon's hope, her bracelet shatter and dies, and Chibi-Chibi reveals her true form as Sailor Cosmos. Sailor Moon manages to defeat Chaos within the Cauldron with the powers of the Sailor Crystals, and Sailor Cosmos returns to the future with newfound hope and courage. Usagi, Mamoru and her friends are revived and sent back to Earth by Guardian Cosmos after choosing to live their current lives. Sometime in the future, Usagi and Mamoru marry, and he reflects that when they all disappear one day, Sailor Moon will forever shine as a bright, beautiful star. The film covered the latter half of the Stars arc from the manga.

== Home media releases ==
=== Japanese ===
King Records released the first two seasons in 13 volumes on DVD and Blu-ray format.

King Records (Japan, Region A/2)
Volume	Episodes	Limited edition Blu-ray release date	DVD/Blu-ray release date
Volume 1	1–2	October 15, 2014	November 12, 2014
Volume 2	3–4	November 12, 2014	December 10, 2014
Volume 3	5–6	December 10, 2014	January 14, 2015
Volume 4	7–8	January 14, 2015	February 11, 2015
Volume 5	9–10	February 11, 2015	March 11, 2015
Volume 6	11–12	March 11, 2015	April 8, 2015
Volume 7	13–14	April 8, 2015	May 13, 2015
Volume 8	15–16	May 13, 2015	June 10, 2015
Volume 9	17–18	June 10, 2015	July 8, 2015
Volume 10	19–20	July 8, 2015	August 12, 2015
Volume 11	21–22	August 12, 2015	September 9, 2015
Volume 12	23–24	September 9, 2015	October 7, 2015
Volume 13	25–26	October 7, 2015	November 11, 2015

Evil Line Records released 3 volumes of the third season in DVD and Blu-ray format.

Evil Line Records (Japan, Region A/2)
Volume	Episodes	Limited edition Blu-ray release date	DVD/Blu-ray release date
Volume 1	27–30	June 29, 2016	–
Volume 2	31–34	July 27, 2016	–
Volume 3	35–39	August 31, 2016	–

=== English ===
Viz Media has licensed the series for release on DVD and Blu-ray format in North America. Madman Entertainment licensed the series for home video release in Australia and New Zealand.

Viz Media (United States and Canada, Region A/1)
Volume	Episodes	DVD/Blu-ray release date
Volume 1	1–14	August 16, 2016
Volume 2	15–26	February 28, 2017
Volume 3	27–39	December 5, 2017

Madman Entertainment (Australia and New Zealand, Region B/4)
Volume	Episodes	DVD/Blu-ray release date
Volume 1	1–14	September 7, 2016
Volume 2	15–26	April 5, 2017
Volume 3	27–39	February 21, 2018
Complete Collection	1–39	September 5, 2018
