= Moon Color Chainon =

2021 single by Momoiro Clover Z

Single by Momoiro Clover Z
- B-side: "Wanting to be Together with You" (Yoko Ishida, Eternal Ed. only); "I'll Go as Myself" (ANZA, Eternal Ed. only)
- Released: January 13, 2021
- Genre: J-pop; Anime song
- Length: 32:08 (Momoiro Clover Z Ed.); 26:27 (Eternal Ed.)
- Label: Evil Line Records
- Composer: Akiko Kosaka
- Lyricist: Sumire Shirobara

Momoiro Clover Z singles chronology
""PLAY!"" (2020)	"Moon Color Chainon" (2021)	""Hoero 2021" (吼えろ 2021, "Howl 2021")" (2021)

Music video
- Momoiro Clover Z with Sailor5Guardians "Moon Color Chainon (Tsukiiro Chainon)" on YouTube

"Moon Color Chainon" (Japanese: 月色Chainon, Hepburn: Tsukiiro Chainon) is the 21st single by the Japanese idol girl group Momoiro Clover Z released on January 13, 2021. The single used as a theme song for the two-part anime film, Pretty Guardian Sailor Moon Eternal The Movie.

== Details ==
The single contains the theme song for the 2021 two-part anime film, Pretty Guardian Sailor Moon Eternal The Movie. "Moon Color Chainon" was written by Sailor Moon creator and mangaka Naoko Takeuchi (under the "Sumire Shirobara" (白薔薇sumire, Shirobara Sumire) pseudonym), composed by Akiko Kosaka, who had previously composed "Gekkō", and arranged by Gesshoku Kaigi band.

The single was released in two versions: "Momoiro Clover Z Edition" and "Eternal Edition". Momoiro Clover Z Edition contains the single that only sung by the group, and re-recorded songs that the group had provided for the Sailor Moon 20th Anniversary Memorial Tribute album, as well as the theme songs from Pretty Guardian Sailor Moon Crystal series. The Eternal Edition contains the single that the group sung with the voice actresses: Kotono Mitsuishi (as Sailor Moon), Hisako Kanemoto (as Sailor Mercury), Rina Satō (as Sailor Mars), Ami Koshimizu (as Sailor Jupiter), and Shizuka Itō (as Sailor Venus), (Note: Also credited as "Sailor5Guardians" (セーラー5戦士, Sērā Gō Senshi).) which was used for the two-part film, as well as the films' ending songs sung by Yoko Ishida and ANZA.

There are two different versions of the music video for the single: The Artist Music Video (Momoiro Clover Z Edition), where it features the group, voice actresses and the band, and the Animation Music Video (Eternal Edition), where it features various clips from the two-part film.

== Track listing ==
=== Momoiro Clover Z Edition (CD+Blu-ray) ===
CD
No.	Title	Lyrics	Music	Length
1.	"Moon Color Chainon (月色Chainon, Tsukiiro Chainon)" (Momoiro Clover Z ver.)	Sumire Shirobara	Akiko Kosaka, Gesshoku Kaigi	4:20
2.	"Moonlight Legend (ムーンライト伝説, Mūnraito Densetsu)" (-ZZ ver.-)	Kanako Oda	Tetsuya Komoro, Kenji Kondo	2:53
3.	"Moon Revenge" (-ZZ ver.-)	Kayoko Fuyumori	Akiko Kosaka, Yukari Hashimoto	4:26
4.	"Tuxedo Mirage" (-ZZ ver.-)	Naoko Takeuchi	Akiko Kosaka, Daisuke Kikuta	3:36
5.	"MOON PRIDE" (-ZZ ver.-)	Revo	Revo	3:43
6.	"Gekkō (月虹, Moon Rainbow)" (-ZZ ver.-)	Sumire Shirobara	Akiko Kosaka	4:22
7.	"Fall in Love with a New Moon (ニュームーンに恋して, Nyū Mūn ni Koishite)" (-ZZ ver.-)	Etsuko Yakushimaru	Tika α	4:24
8.	"Moon Color Chainon (月色Chainon, Tsukiiro Chainon)" (off-vocal ver.)			4:20

Blu-ray Disc
No.	Title	Lyrics	Music	Length
1.	"Moon Color Chainon (月色Chainon, Tsukiiro Chainon)" (Artist Music Video)	Sumire Shirobara	Akiko Kosaka, Gesshoku Kaigi	4:20

=== Eternal edition (CD+Blu-ray) ===
CD
No.	Title	Lyrics	Music	Length
1.	"Moon Color Chainon (月色Chainon, Tsukiiro Chainon)" (performed by Momoiro Clover Z with Sailor Moon (Kotono Mitsuishi), Sailor Mercury (Hisako Kanemoto), Sailor Mars (Rina Satō), Sailor Jupiter (Ami Koshimizu), and Sailor Venus (Shizuka Itō))	Sumire Shirobara	Akiko Kosaka, Gesshoku Kaigi	4:20
2.	"Wanting to be Together with You (私たちになりたくて, Watashi-tachi ni Naritakute)" (performed by Yoko Ishida)	Yasushi Akimoto	Nozomi Inoue, Tomoki Hasegawa	5:17
3.	"I'll Go as Myself ("らしく" いきましょ, "Rashiku" Ikimasho)" (performed by ANZA)	Naoko Takeuchi	Masao Mizuno, Yukihiro Fukutomi	3:31
4.	"Moon Color Chainon (月色Chainon, Tsukiiro Chainon)" (off-vocal ver.)			4:20
5.	"Wanting to be Together with You (私たちになりたくて, Watashi-tachi ni Naritakute)" (off-vocal ver.)			5:17
6.	"I'll Go as Myself ("らしく" いきましょ, "Rashiku" Ikimasho)" (off-vocal ver.)			3:31

Blu-ray Disc
No.	Title	Lyrics	Music	Length
1.	"Moon Color Chainon (月色Chainon, Tsukiiro Chainon)" (Animation Music Video)	Sumire Shirobara	Akiko Kosaka, Gesshoku Kaigi	4:20

== Personnel ==
Momoiro Clover Z

- Kanako Momota – lead and backing vocals
- Ayaka Sasaki – lead and backing vocals
- Reni Takagi – lead and backing vocals
- Shiori Tamai – lead and backing vocals

Sailor5Guardians

- Kotono Mitsuishi (as Sailor Moon) – lead and backing vocals
- Hisako Kanemoto (as Sailor Mercury) – lead and backing vocals
- Rina Satō (as Sailor Mars) – lead and backing vocals
- Ami Koshimizu (as Sailor Jupiter) – lead and backing vocals
- Shizuka Itō (as Sailor Venus) – lead and backing vocals

Additional artists

- Yoko Ishida – lead and backing vocals ("Wanting to be Together with You")
- ANZA – lead and backing vocals ("I'll Go as Myself")

Additional music

- MIZ – 1st violin ("Moon Color Chainon")
- Mari Mikuni – 2nd violin ("Moon Color Chainon")
- Akari Mori – Viola ("Moon Color Chainon")
- Mayumi Sano – Cello ("Moon Color Chainon")

== Chart performance ==
The "Momoiro Clover Z" edition of the single album ranked number 6 in the Oricon top 10 album charts in January 2021. It also peaked number 7 in the component Billboard Hot Albums, and number 60 in the component Billboard Download Songs.

== See also ==
- Pretty Guardian Sailor Moon Eternal The Movie
