= Joshiraku =

Manga series by Kōji Kumeta and Yasu and its adaptations

- Cover of the first manga volume

じょしらく (Joshiraku)
- Genre: Comedy
- Manga
- Written by: Kōji Kumeta
- Illustrated by: Yasu
- Published by: Kodansha
- Imprint: Wide KC
- Magazine: Bessatsu Shōnen Magazine
- Original run: September 9, 2009 – September 9, 2013
- Volumes: 6
- Anime television series
- Directed by: Tsutomu Mizushima
- Written by: Michiko Yokote
- Music by: Masaru Yokoyama
- Studio: J.C.Staff
- Licensed by: NA: Maiden Japan
- Original network: MBS, TBS, CBC, BS-TBS
- Original run: July 5, 2012 – September 28, 2012
- Episodes: 13
- Original animation DVD
- Directed by: Tsutomu Mizushima
- Written by: Michiko Yokote
- Music by: Masaru Yokoyama
- Studio: J.C.Staff
- Released: February 8, 2013

Joshiraku (Japanese: じょしらく; lit. "Rakugo Girls") is a Japanese comedy manga series written by Kōji Kumeta and illustrated by Yasu, telling the everyday lives of five young female rakugo comedians. It was serialised in Kodansha's Bessatsu Shōnen Magazine from September 2009 to September 2013 and the chapters compiled into six tankōbon volumes. An anime television series adaptation animated by J.C.Staff aired in Japan between July and September 2012, with an original video animation episode released in February 2013.

== Characters ==
All of the girls' surnames end with the character Tei (亭), which is often used in stage names for performers.

Marii Buratei (蕪羅亭 魔梨威, Buratei Marii)
Voiced by: Ayane Sakura (Anime), Kana Asumi (CD)
The substantial protagonist of the manga, who has long red hair. She behaves like Edokko and speaks in a masculine tone of Edo speech, but she is actually from Tokushima Prefecture. Despite her good looks, the way she talks and her flat chest tend to lead the others into suspecting her as a boy cross-dressing as a girl. She acts as a tsukkomi and often says "Don't ask a trifling question! (つまんねー事聞くなよ！, Tsuman'nē koto kiku na yo!)". Her name is a pun on Bloody Mary.
Tetora Bōhatei (防波亭 手寅, Bōhatei Tetora)
Voiced by: Nozomi Yamamoto (Anime), Ikumi Hayama (CD)
A ponytailed girl with brown hair who is a good lucky/happy-go-lucky girl and leads a carefree life. She often leads the stories to other subjects. Kumeta introduces her as the true protagonist of the manga. Her name is a pun on bōhatei (防波堤, "breakwater") and Tetrapod.
Kigurumi Harōkitei (波浪浮亭 木胡桃, Harōkitei Kigurumi)
Voiced by: Kotori Koiwai (Anime), Erena Ono (CD)
A girl with cream-coloured hair who is the youngest girl in the group. To match her childlike figure, she often pretends to be cute in front of others, but her internal dialogue shows her true thoughts to the audience; cynical and manipulative. Her name is a pun on Hello Kitty and kigurumi.
Gankyō Kūrubiyūtei (空琉美遊亭 丸京, Kūrubiyūtei Gankyō)
Voiced by: Yoshino Nanjō (Anime), Kana Hanazawa (CD)
A girl with glasses and green hair who is a smart, cool, level-headed, yet cold-hearted, violent girl. She is a childhood friend of Tetora's. Her name is a pun on cool beauty and gankyō (眼鏡, "glasses").
Kukuru Anrakutei (暗落亭 苦来, Anrakutei Kukuru)
Voiced by: Saori Gotō (Anime/CD)
A girl with straight black hair who is very good at acting, but is a bad unlucky girl and is very emotionally hot-headed, crybaby, and cowardly. Her name is a play on several words, all of which have to do with things that are very negative in nature. The pronunciation of her name refers to Anrakushi (安楽死, "Euthanasia") and kukuru (括る, "to hang"). Her name could also be read alternatively as kurakutei kurai, which is very similar to kurakute kurai (暗くて暗い, lit. "dark dark"). Anrakutei also sounds similar to the word unlucky. Also, the kanji in her name minus the character Tei (亭) could be read very literally, as falling into darkness and coming of anguish.
Mask (覆面, Fukumen)
Voiced by: Aoi Yūki
A girl in a luchador wrestling mask who just happens to be in the scene at certain points.
Uzannu Uzattei (宇座亭 ウザンヌ, Uzattei Uzannu)
Voiced by: Ryōko Shintani
A girl who has short blonde and pink hair. She wears a strawberry-patterned hakama and a large ribbon on her head. Her only appearance is in the last episode of the anime. True to her name, Uzannu is annoying with her fast-talking, condescending attitude, and mimicry of the other girls. Uzannu purposely tries to upset the character balance of the show with her obnoxiousness and make the show her own, even going so far as singing her own version of the opening theme song with personalized lyrics. Nonetheless, the girls manage to drive her away.

== Media ==
=== Manga ===
Joshiraku began as a manga series written by Kōji Kumeta and illustrated by Yasu. It was serialized in Kodansha's Bessatsu Shōnen Magazine between the October 2009 and October 2013 issues – from September 9, 2009, to September 9, 2013. The chapters were also collected and released into six tankōbon volumes under the Wild KC imprint, from May 17, 2010, to November 8, 2013. A limited edition of the fifth volume was bundled with an anime episode on DVD disc.

=== Anime ===
A 13-episode anime television series adaptation animated by J.C.Staff aired in Japan between July and September 2012. An original video animation episode was released on DVD with the fifth manga volume on February 8, 2013. The opening theme is "Oato ga Yoroshikutte...Yo!" (お後がよろしくって…よ!, Thanks For Your Appreciation!) by Ayane Sakura, Kotori Koiwai, Nozomi Yamamoto, Yoshino Nanjō and Saori Gotō, and the ending theme is "Nippon Egao Hyakkei" (ニッポン笑顔百景, Hundreds of Japanese Smiles) by Momoiro Clover Z and Yoshida Brothers. In 2019, Maiden Japan licensed the series.

==== Episode list ====
No.	Title	Original release date
1	"Normal Dialogue"; Transliteration: "Fudan Mondō" (Japanese: 普段問答)	July 5, 2012
1	"Different Clothes"; Transliteration: "Fuku Chigai" (Japanese: ふく違い)	July 5, 2012
1	"Shouting Instructions"; Transliteration: "Sakebi Shinan" (Japanese: 叫び指南)	July 5, 2012
As five young rakugo comedians, Marii, Kigurumi, Tetora, Gankyō and Kukuru, receive an invitation to a casual dress party, they ponder over what it exactly means to dress casually. Later, the discussion turns to whether everyone prefers dogs or cats.
2	"Backstage Riches"; Transliteration: "Gakuya no Tomi" (Japanese: 楽屋の富)	July 12, 2012
2	"Three Towers and a Vow"; Transliteration: "Santō Kishō" (Japanese: 三塔起請)	July 12, 2012
2	"Cold Girl"; Transliteration: "Kaze Musume" (Japanese: 風邪娘)	July 12, 2012
The girls talk about what they would do if they won the lottery, leading them to suspect one of them may be a winner. Later, they visit the Tokyo Tower where more strange conversations are to be had. Afterwards, a discussion about vaccination turns into a bout of imaginary pregnancy.
3	"A Bath Beyond"; Transliteration: "Mujō Buro" (Japanese: 無情風呂)	July 19, 2012
3	"Asakusa Visit"; Transliteration: "Asakusa Mairi" (Japanese: 浅草参り)	July 19, 2012
3	"Sanada Ko-ZOO"; Transliteration: "Sanada Kozū" (Japanese: 真田小ZOO)	July 19, 2012
Marii ends up having to prove that she's not a crossdressing boy. Later, the girls visit Asakusa where they try their hand at some fortunes. This leads the girls to discuss why Tetora has such great luck and always seems to avoid danger.
4	"Glasses Girl"; Transliteration: "Megane Komusume" (Japanese: 眼鏡小娘)	July 26, 2012
4	"Nausea at Daiba"; Transliteration: "Yoiyoi Daiba" (Japanese: よいよい台場)	July 26, 2012
4	"Bunny Eyes"; Transliteration: "Usagi no Me" (Japanese: 兎の目)	July 26, 2012
As Gankyō exhibits some violent behavior, the girls discuss the stereotypes that come when a girl wears glasses. Later, as Kukuru gets trainsick, the girls try to come up with various remedies for her nausea. Afterwards, on the night of a full moon, the girls sit and discuss moon-related topics before being attacked by a large rabbit.
5	"Praise the Girl"; Transliteration: "Ko Home" (Japanese: 娘ほめ)	August 3, 2012
5	"Stylish Town"; Transliteration: "Kojare Machi" (Japanese: 小洒落町)	August 3, 2012
5	"Farewell to Glasses"; Transliteration: "Megane Wakare" (Japanese: 眼鏡別れ)	August 3, 2012
The girls attempt to cheer Kukuru up by holding an out-of-season Christmas party. Later, the girls visit Harajuku, where Marii gets anxious over a crépe. Afterwards, the gang discuss how they all have different types of skin, making Gankyō feeling left out.
6	"Four Wows"; Transliteration: "Yonmai Kishō" (Japanese: 四枚起承)	August 10, 2012
6	"Musashi Scenery"; Transliteration: "Musashi Hakkei" (Japanese: 武蔵八景)	August 10, 2012
6	"The Servant's Vengeance"; Transliteration: "Shimobe no Adauchi" (Japanese: 下僕の仇討ち)	August 10, 2012
Having forced Gankyō out of the group during the previous episode, the rest talk about the benefits of having a group of four. Gankyō soon gets revenge by locking everyone in the dressing room. After eventually being let back into the group, Gankyo is reluctantly placed at the bottom of the hierarchy but soon has aspirations of winning an election.
7	"Yankees are Scary"; Transliteration: "Yankī Kowai" (Japanese: ヤンキー怖い)	August 17, 2012
7	"Fish Story"; Transliteration: "Sakana Seidan" (Japanese: 魚政談)	August 17, 2012
7	"Backstage Files"; Transliteration: "Gakuya Shirabe" (Japanese: 楽屋調べ)	August 17, 2012
The sudden appearance of Hina dolls in the dressing room somehow leads to the girls deciding to act like delinquents so they will marry early. Later, the girls get up early to go to a fish market. Afterwards, the girls search for things that might be using up electricity, becoming oblivious to the non-electric horrors hidden throughout the room.
8	"Bag of Gold"; Transliteration: "Kogane Bukuro" (Japanese: こがね袋)	August 23, 2012
8	"Totter"; Transliteration: "Yoroyoro" (Japanese: よろよろ)	August 23, 2012
8	"Is It Over Yet?"; Transliteration: "Mō Yanda ka" (Japanese: もうやんだか)	August 23, 2012
Marii laments how she's always the last to go in various things, particularly when it comes to picking out envelopes of New Year's money. Later, the girls head to the Sugamo district and check out the various spots. Afterwards, the gang needlessly worry that Kukuru might contract the May Blues, randomly choosing to take on "Blues" from other months.
9	"Butt-tofu"; Transliteration: "Shiri-totechin" (Japanese: しりとてちん)	August 30, 2012
9	"The Bear of Ueno"; Transliteration: "Ueno no Kuma" (Japanese: 上野のクマ)	August 30, 2012
9	"Sleep talking" Transliteration: "Negoto" (Japanese: ねごと)	August 30, 2012
As school holidays roll in, the girls try and come up with ways to make rakugo more appealing to younger audiences. Later, the gang visit the zoo and discuss the curiosities of all the animals. Afterwards, the gang gets taste for lucky events which keep occurring whenever Marii falls asleep, constantly trying to make her sleep to reap the benefits.
10	"Pumpkin Band"; Transliteration: "Tōnasu-ya Gakudan" (Japanese: 唐茄子屋楽団)	September 6, 2012
10	"Battle of Shinjuku"; Transliteration: "Shinjuku Aragoto" (Japanese: 新宿荒事)	September 6, 2012
10	"Cavity Shore"; Transliteration: "Mushiba Hama" (Japanese: 虫歯浜)	September 6, 2012
On Halloween, the girls try to tailor the holiday to be more Japanese-esque. Later, the girls visit the Kabukichou entertainment district and observe how it's changed over the years. Afterwards, Marii is plagued with tooth cavities.
11	"Family Play"; Transliteration: "Oyako Shibai" (Japanese: 親子芝居)	September 13, 2012
11	"Sakai Five"; Transliteration: "Gonin Sakai" (Japanese: 五人さかい)	September 13, 2012
11	"Tree Tragedy"; Transliteration: "Tsurī Sanji" (Japanese: ツリー惨事)	September 13, 2012
As the girls have a fake summer beach trip in the dressing room, they discuss the different designs of school swimsuits. Then, the girls go sightseeing in Musashi-Sakai and pay their respects to the company responsible for animating them. Lastly, the girls have a Christmas party, but the tree that Tetora ordered online completely fills the dressing room, causing them to try and reunite (but end up fighting each other) in the Amazon-like jungle.
12	"The Dreamer Strikes Back"; Transliteration: "Yumemi no Katakiuchi" (Japanese: 夢見の仇討ち)	September 20, 2012
12	"Gotta"; Transliteration: "Koainō" (Japanese: こぁいのう)	September 20, 2012
12	"Blacks"; Transliteration: "Aoge" (Japanese: 青毛)	September 20, 2012
When Tetora asks everyone about their first dream of the new year, Kukuru grows upset as she has yet to have one. So, the girls attempt to act out a "first dream" to cheer her up. Later, the gang visits Roppongi, where they look at structural artwork and Marii travels through time to see the city during its economic bubble. Finally, the girls try to cool off during the summer by mentioning scary things to give themselves chills and eventually by painting everything blue.
13	"Character Guts"; Transliteration: "Kyara Tsubushi" (Japanese: キャラつぶし)	September 27, 2012
13	"Mighty Akiba"; Transliteration: "Akibaburu" (Japanese: アキバぶる)	September 27, 2012
13	"Extra Lectures"; Transliteration: "Choitashi Kōshaku" (Japanese: ちょいたし講釈)	September 27, 2012
As the girls come to terms that the show has reached its last episode, a new character appears: an exasperating girl named Uzannu Uzattei. While discussing whether or not "once" is truly enough, Uzannu's personality irritates everyone and threatens the character balance of the show. After the girls drive her away, they visit Akihabara. Later, the girls debate about how some things should be left as they are. Finally, the show ends with one last rakugo performance by Marii.
OVA	"Store of Spoils"; Transliteration: "Dainashiya" (Japanese: 台無屋)	February 8, 2013
OVA	"Three Publishers"; Transliteration: "Sangen Hon'ya" (Japanese: 三軒本屋)	February 8, 2013
OVA	"Surprising Resolve"; Transliteration: "Bikkuri Shūchū" (Japanese: びっくり集中)	February 8, 2013
As Marii laments how the audience tends to applaud before she can finish her joke, the others point out she is also guilty of bad timing. Later, the girls visit Jinbōchō, where they visit the buildings of various publishers whilst searching for Kodansha's office. Afterwards, Kigu ends up concentrating so much that she ends up being afflicted with focus lines whilst Marii also becomes afflicted with a romantic and fluffy backdrop.
