= Sailor Moon Eternal =

2021 two-part film by Chiaki Kon

- Theatrical release poster for Part 1
- Japanese: 劇場版「美少女戦士セーラームーンEternal(エターナル)」
- Literal meaning: Pretty Guardian Sailor Moon Eternal The Movie
- Revised Hepburn: Gekijōban Bishōjo Senshi Sērā Mūn Etānaru
- Directed by: Chiaki Kon
- Screenplay by: Kazuyuki Fudeyasu
- Based on: Sailor Moon by Naoko Takeuchi
- Produced by: Ruka Tanaka; Hideharu Gomi; Yōsuke Asama (Part 2)
- Starring: Kotono Mitsuishi; Hisako Kanemoto; Rina Satō; Ami Koshimizu; Shizuka Itō; Misato Fukuen; Kenji Nojima; Junko Minagawa; Sayaka Ohara; Ai Maeda; Yukiyo Fujii; Ryō Hirohashi; Taishi Murata; Shoko Nakagawa; Yoshitsugu Matsuoka; Naomi Watanabe; Nanao
- Cinematography: Shigemitsu Hamao; Takashi Yanagida (Part 2)
- Edited by: Keiko Onodera
- Music by: Yasuharu Takanashi
- Production companies: Toei Animation; Studio Deen
- Distributed by: Toei Company, Ltd.
- Release dates: January 8, 2021 (Part 1); February 11, 2021 (Part 2)
- Running time: 160 minutes (total, 80 minutes per film)
- Country: Japan
- Language: Japanese

Sailor Moon Eternal (Note: Also known as Pretty Guardian Sailor Moon Eternal The Movie (Japanese: 劇場版「美少女戦士セーラームーンEternal(エターナル)」, Hepburn: Gekijōban Bishōjo Senshi Sērā Mūn Etānaru).) is a 2021 Japanese two-part animated action fantasy film directed by Chiaki Kon and written by Kazuyuki Fudeyasu based on the Dream arc of the Sailor Moon manga by Naoko Takeuchi, who also serves as a chief supervisor. Co-produced by Toei Animation and Studio Deen and distributed by Toei Company, Eternal is a direct continuation and a "fourth season" for the Sailor Moon Crystal anime series. The two-part film stars Kotono Mitsuishi as the voice of Sailor Moon alongside Hisako Kanemoto, Rina Satō, Ami Koshimizu, Shizuka Itō, Misato Fukuen, Kenji Nojima, Junko Minagawa, Sayaka Ohara, Ai Maeda, Yukiyo Fujii, Ryō Hirohashi, Taishi Murata, Shoko Nakagawa, Yoshitsugu Matsuoka, Naomi Watanabe, and Nanao. Eternal was released in Japan in 2021, with the first film on January 8, and the second film on February 11.

The two-part film is the first in the franchise to screen in Japanese theaters in 26 years, the last one having been Sailor Moon SuperS: The Movie, released in 1995.

Netflix acquired streaming rights to both films, and they premiered on June 3, 2021, on the streaming service. A sequel two-part film, Sailor Moon Cosmos, was released in Japan in June 2023, and on Netflix worldwide in August 2024.

== Plot ==
=== Part One ===
Six months after the Mugen Academy incident, (Note: As depicted in Sailor Moon Crystal Season 3 (2016).) Usagi Tsukino and Chibiusa receive a vision from a pegasus named Helios asking for their help, and Mamoru Chiba gets a stabbing feeling in his chest. The Dead Moon Circus arrives on a flagship and its members conjure a dark barrier around the area where the circus tent is. That night, Chibiusa dreams of riding Pegasus, who tells her that he needs the Golden Crystal to save his home realm of Elysion. When Chibiusa tries returning to the 30th century with Diana, the dark barrier stops her and prompts the Amazoness Quartet to send a tiger to investigate. Usagi and Chibiusa's brooches are upgraded, allowing them to transform into Super Sailors Moon and Chibi Moon. The Amazoness send some Lemures to fight the Super Sailor Guardians, but they quickly destroy them.

The circus' ringleader Zirconia is instructed by her master, Queen Nehelenia, to let the Super Sailor Guardians' nightmares take hold of them so she can obtain the Silver Crystal. PallaPalla sends the Amazon Trio members Fish Eye, Tiger's Eye, and Hawk's Eye to trap Ami Mizuno, Rei Hino, and Makoto Kino in their respective nightmares, one Guardian at a time. However, the girls break free of them and transform with their respective Sailor Crystals into their Super forms, enabling them to destroy the Amazon Trio. Helios reveals that Mamoru's incessant chest pain are caused by Nehelenia's curse on Elysion, a sacred place within Earth, which also caused Helios to turn into a pegasus, imprisoning him in a cage from which he is astral projecting. Sailor Moon promises to heal Mamoru and hugs him, but is given the same curse as Mamoru.

Minako Aino is unable to transform, and the Amazoness VesVes sends two knife-throwing twins, Xenotime and Zeolite, after her. In the ensuing conflict, VesVes sends Minako falling to her death, but Artemis intervenes and gives Minako her crystal, enabling her to transform into Super Sailor Venus and destroy Xenotime and Zeolite. PallaPalla then traps the four Sailor Guardians in vines. Usagi then falls ill from a black rose inside her, and Zirconia brings darkness to Earth with the nightmare energy she has accumulated.

=== Part Two ===
Sailor Saturn's spirit talks to young Hotaru Tomoe, and restores her memories of her previous life. Hotaru then gives Haruka Tenoh, Michiru Kaioh, and Setsuna Meioh their crystals, allowing them to transform into Super Sailors Uranus, Neptune, Pluto, and Saturn. They then free Sailors Mercury, Mars, Jupiter, and Venus from PallaPalla's vines. Sailor Chibi Moon, Sailor Moon, and Tuxedo Mask arrive to help, but Zirconia mortally wounds Sailor Moon and Tuxedo Mask. Helios teleports Usagi and Mamoru to Elysion to save their lives with what little purification power it has left. Sailors Chibi Moon and Saturn confront the Amazoness Quartet inside a tent, and Saturn reveals the Amazoness Quartet were corrupted by Nehelenia's nightmare power. As the Amazoness Quartet start to come to their senses, Zirconia imprisons them inside orbs, and traps Chibi Moon and Saturn inside shards of glass, before putting all six inside Nehelenia's mirror.

In Elysion, Helios explains to Usagi and Mamoru that the Golden Kingdom used to exist in Elysion, and the Golden Crystal is Earth and Elysion's counterpart to the Silver Millennium's Silver Crystal. Usagi then realizes the Golden Crystal is inside Mamoru, just as the Silver Crystal was sealed inside her. (Note: As depicted in Sailor Moon Crystal Season 1 (2014), where Sailor Moon was revealed to be Princess Serenity.) After Helios sends Usagi and Mamoru back to the surface, Zirconia incapacitates them with a fog around Jūban. In a dying act, Helios sends Elysion's purifying crystals to Earth, blocking Zirconia's fog, and heals the group. Zirconia attacks Sailor Moon and Tuxedo Mask, and spreads nightmares, but Tuxedo Mask breaks himself and others free from the nightmares, and the Sailor Guardians use their combined powers to blast and weaken Zirconia who flees into Nehelenia's mirror. Sailor Moon follows her inside and frees Sailors Chibi Moon and Saturn, with the latter taking the four orbs containing the Amazoness Quartet with her. The others break the mirror and free them all, but Nehelenia disappears and Zirconia remains inside the mirror.

The Dead Moon Circus disappears, but the darkness remains throughout the city. The Sailor Guardians and Tuxedo Mask teleport to Elysion, where Nehelenia appears inside her mirror and deflects Super Sailor Moon's attack, sending everyone into a flashback of Nehelenia's past: Nehelenia had arrived uninvited at the party celebrating Princess Serenity's birth. After their exchange was escalated, Nehelenia was permanently sealed inside her mirror by Queen Serenity, but not before cursing the princess and the Silver Millennium to their downfall. (Note: As depicted in both Sailor Moon Crystal Season 1 (2014) and Season 3 (2016), where Queen Metaria and the Dark Kingdom destroyed the Silver Millennium, with Sailor Saturn resetting the Solar System afterwards.)

Nehelenia takes the Silver Crystal from Super Sailor Moon, but before she can kill the Super Sailor Guardians and take over Earth, Usagi and Tuxedo Mask kiss, breaking free of Nehelenia's nightmare and getting the Silver Crystal back. Super Sailor Moon transforms the other Sailor Guardians into their princess forms and summons Luna, Artemis, and Diana in human form. The other Sailor Guardians, after gaining new Eternal forms, and Tuxedo Mask, using his Golden Crystal, transform Sailor Moon into Eternal Sailor Moon, who destroys Nehelenia and her mirror and restores Earth and Elysion to normal. Eternal Sailor Chibi Moon uses her Pink Moon Crystal to revive Helios, causing him to realize she was the maiden in his vision.

The Amazoness Quartet are revealed to be Sailor Guardians of the asteroids: Sailors Ceres, Pallas, Juno, and Vesta, who were asleep in the Amazon Jungle until Nehelenia forced them to awaken into a nightmare. They return to their slumber, only to reawaken when Sailor Chibi Moon becomes a full-fledged Sailor Guardian in the future. Helios escorts the others back to the surface before returning to Elysion, assuring Chibiusa they will meet again. Mamoru wonders if the warm feeling in his chest is caused by the Golden Crystal, but Usagi assures that it's a star shining in his heart.

== Voice cast ==
Character	Japanese voice cast	English voice cast
Usagi Tsukino/Super Sailor Moon	Kotono Mitsuishi	Stephanie Sheh
Luna	Ryō Hirohashi	Michelle Ruff
Mamoru Chiba/Tuxedo Mask	Kenji Nojima; Mutsumi Tamura (young)	Robbie Daymond
Ami Mizuno/Super Sailor Mercury	Hisako Kanemoto	Kate Higgins
Rei Hino/Super Sailor Mars	Rina Satō	Cristina Vee
Makoto Kino/Super Sailor Jupiter	Ami Koshimizu	Amanda C. Miller
Minako Aino/Super Sailor Venus	Shizuka Itō	Cherami Leigh
Artemis	Taishi Murata	Johnny Yong Bosch
Chibiusa/Super Sailor Chibi Moon	Misato Fukuen	Sandy Fox
Diana	Shoko Nakagawa	Debi Derryberry
Setsuna Meioh/Super Sailor Pluto	Ai Maeda	Veronica Taylor
Haruka Tenoh/Super Sailor Uranus	Junko Minagawa	Erica Mendez
Michiru Kaioh/Super Sailor Neptune	Sayaka Ohara	Lauren Landa
Hotaru Tomoe/Super Sailor Saturn	Yukiyo Fujii	Christine Marie Cabanos
Pegasus/Helios	Yoshitsugu Matsuoka	Brian Beacock
Queen Nehelenia	Nanao	Laura Post
Zirconia	Naomi Watanabe	Barbara Goodson
Fish Eye	Shouta Aoi	Erik Scott Kimerer
Tiger's Eye	Satoshi Hino	John Eric Bentley
Hawk's Eye	Toshiyuki Toyonaga	Michael Yurchak
CereCere/Sailor Ceres	Reina Ueda	Cassandra Lee Morris
PallaPalla/Sailor Pallas	Sumire Morohoshi	Xanthe Huynh
JunJun/Sailor Juno	Yuko Hara	Erika Ishii
VesVes/Sailor Vesta	Rie Takahashi	Erica Lindbeck

Additional voice cast includes:

Character	Japanese Voice Cast	English Voice Cast
Rei's Grandfather	Hirohiko Kakegawa	Todd Haberkorn
Xenotime	Yōhei Azakami	Todd Haberkorn
Zeolite	Ryōhei Arai	Ezra Weisz
Phobos	Kanami Taguchi	Xanthe Huynh
Deimos	Aya Yamane	Kelly Baskin
Ami's mom	Naomi Shindō	Kelly Baskin
Maenads	Ruriko Noguchi (Maenad 1)	Wendee Lee
Maenads	Yuuki Hirose (Maenad 2)	Wendee Lee
Queen Serenity	Mami Koyama	Wendee Lee

== Production ==
=== Development ===
On January 25, 2017, it was announced on the official Sailor Moon 25th anniversary website that the Sailor Moon Crystal anime would continue. Later, on June 30 of the same year, it was revealed that the fourth season based on Dream arc of the manga was to be produced as a two-part theatrical anime film project. Additionally, Chiaki Kon, who was a series director for its third season, reprised her role as a director for the two-part film. Kon revealed in an interview that she was thrilled to return, and was excited when it was being produced as two films, as she first found out when she was storyboarding for the season finale for the third season.

On June 30, 2018, it was announced that the film's production had begun, and Kazuko Tadano, who handled the character designs for the first two seasons of the 1990s Sailor Moon anime series and Sailor Moon R: The Movie, was chosen as a character designer for the film. Tadano had commented:

"I never dreamed that I'd be able to participate in this work that I had been involved with 25 years ago. I'm very happy to be involved as character designer once again for this work, which is beloved around the world. I feel anxious, because this is my first time working as a character designer for the latter part of the series, which makes me wanna work even harder. Please continue to support Sailor Moon!"

Tadano received no additional instructions from Kon or the producers other than "follow the manga closely as possible", so she made sure the art style was "reminiscent to the past with a modern nuiance while closely following original creator Naoko Takeuchi's imagery".

At the time of production, the film's original name was Pretty Guardian Sailor Moon Crystal The Movie -Dead Moon arc- (劇場版「美少女戦士セーラームーンCrystal(クリスタル)」＜デッド・ムーン編＞, Gekijōban Bishōjo Senshi Sērā Mūn Kurisutaru Dēddō Mūn Hen).

On June 30, 2019, more staff has been revealed: Kazuyuki Fudeyasu served as a screenwriter, original creator and manga artist Naoko Takeuchi chief supervised the films' production, Studio Deen co-animated and produced the films with Toei Animation, and the name for the two-part film was decided as Pretty Guardian Sailor Moon Eternal The Movie (劇場版「美少女戦士セーラームーンEternal(エターナル)」, Gekijōban Bishōjo Senshi Sērā Mūn Etānaru).

=== Casting ===
Most of the main voice actors from Sailor Moon Crystal had returned for the two-part film, but, for unknown reasons, Taishi Murata took over Yohei Oobayashi's role as Artemis. In April 2020, it was announced that Yoshitsugu Matsuoka will voice Pegasus/Helios for the film. In August 2020, it was announced that Shouta Aoi, Satoshi Hino, and Toshiyuki Toyonaga were to voice the Amazon Trio: Fish Eye, Tiger's Eye, and Hawk's Eye. The following week, Reina Ueda, Sumire Morohoshi, Yuko Hara, and Rie Takahashi were cast as the Amazoness Quartet: CereCere, PallaPalla, JunJun, and VesVes. In September 2020, it was announced that the Japanese comedian, fashion designer and actress Naomi Watanabe was cast as Zirconia. The following month, Japanese model and actress Nanao was cast as Queen Nehelenia.

=== Music ===
Yasuharu Takanashi returned to compose the music for the two-part film. The theme song for the two-part film is "Moon Color Chainon" (月色Chainon, Tsukiiro Chainon), performed by Momoiro Clover Z with Sailor5Guardians. (Note: The five voice actresses of the main Sailor Guardians: Kotono Mitsuishi (Sailor Moon), Hisako Kanemoto (Sailor Mercury), Rina Satō (Sailor Mars), Ami Koshimizu (Sailor Jupiter), and Shizuka Itō (Sailor Venus).) The song's lyrics were written by Naoko Takeuchi (under the name of "Sumire Shirobara"), composed by Akiko Kosaka, and arranged by Gesshoku Kaigi. The ending theme for the first film is "Wanting to Be Together with You" (私たちになりたくて, Watashi-tachi ni Naritakute), performed by Yoko Ishida, and the ending theme for the second film is "I'll Go As Myself" ("らしく" いきましょ, "Rashiku" Ikimasho), performed by Anza. The eleven-track character song collection album, titled Pretty Guardian Sailor Moon Eternal The Movie Character Song Collection: Eternal Collection, was released on February 10, 2021, and the eleventh track, titled "Moon Effect", performed by the voice actresses for all ten Sailor Guardians, is used as an insert song for the second film.

== Release ==
=== Japanese release ===
The first film was slated to release in Japanese theaters on September 11, 2020, but was postponed and released four months later on January 8, 2021, due to COVID-19 pandemic. The second film was released on February 11, 2021. The Japanese Blu-ray and DVD were released on June 30, 2021.

=== International release ===
In late April 2021, it was announced that Netflix acquired the streaming rights for the two-part film, and it premiered worldwide (excluding Japan and Mainland China) on June 3, 2021. In early May 2021, it was announced that the English dub cast from both Sailor Moon Crystal and the redub of the 1990s anime reprised their roles, with the exception of Chris Niosi as he did not reprise his role as Helios. The role was assumed by Brian Beacock who previously voiced Ail, an original character in the redub of Sailor Moon R.

== Reception ==
The first film debuted ninth place out of top ten from weekend box office, and also ranked sixth in Filmarks' first-day satisfaction ranking with a score of 3.46 out of 5 based on 242 reviews. On review aggregator Rotten Tomatoes, the two-part film holds a 100% rating based on eleven reviews.

Victoria Johnson of Polygon gave a positive review, and wrote "At its heart, Pretty Guardian Sailor Moon Eternal The Movie is about overcoming evil with the power of love and friendship. And there's nothing more Sailor Moon than that". Lynzee Loveridge of Anime News Network gave a B approval rating and wrote "Pretty Guardian Sailor Moon Eternal is a solid entry in the Sailor Moon canon that had the pieces to be something even better. You can put your worries aside as it routinely looks excellent and, occasionally, fantastic". Rosie Knight from IGN labeled the two films as a "good adventure that boasts stunning animation, vibrant storytelling, and the return of our favorite magical girl Sailor Scouts in a dynamic double bill that will inspire and entertain." Michael Mammano from Den of Geek stated that Eternal is "an enthralling adaptation of one of the manga's best arcs."

== Sequel ==
A sequel was hinted at the end of the second film during its Japanese theatrical release, with an English teaser-line, "To be continued..." On April 28, 2022, during the Sailor Moon 30th anniversary livestream, the sequel covering the Stars arc of the manga, was announced as a two-part anime film, titled Pretty Guardian Sailor Moon Cosmos The Movie (劇場版「美少女戦士セーラームーンCosmos(コスモス)」, Gekijōban Bishōjo Senshi Sērā Mūn Kosumosu). Cosmos was released in Japan on June 9 and 30, 2023, respectively, and began streaming on Netflix worldwide on August 22, 2024.
