= Yukina Kashiwa =

Former Japanese actress and idol singer (born 1994)

- 柏 幸奈
- Born: August 12, 1994 (age 31); Kanagawa Prefecture, Japan
- Occupations: Japanese idol; actress; singer
- Years active: 2004–2009, 2011–2013, 2015–2022
- Agents: Stardust Promotion (2008–2009) Nogizaka46, LLC (2011–2013); Japan Music Entertainment (2016–2022)
- Musical career
- Genres: J-pop
- Label: Sony Records/N46Div
- Formerly of: Momoiro Clover; Nogizaka46

Yukina Kashiwa (柏 幸奈, Kashiwa Yukina; born August 12, 1994) is a former Japanese actress and idol singer. She was in the girl groups Momoiro Clover Z and Nogizaka46.

== Career ==
As a child, Kashiwa acted in many tokusatsu dramas, including Tokusō Sentai Dekaranger, Garo, and Madan Senki Ryukendo. In 2007, at the age of 13, she played the role of Negi Springfield, the title character of Negima! Magister Negi Magi, in a 25-episode live-action TV series based on the manga and anime of the same name.

Along with Ayaka Sasaki and Akari Hayami, Kashiwa joined Stardust Promotion's girl group Momoiro Clover, now known as Momoiro Clover Z, on November 23, 2008. Simultaneously, the group announced their debut single, titled "Momoiro Punch". However, Kashiwa left the group on March 9 of the following year, before the single was released.

On August 21, 2011, Kashiwa passed the audition to become a first generation member of the idol girl group Nogizaka46. On November 12, 2013, the Nogizaka46 website announced that Kashiwa would be graduating from the group in order to concentrate on her studies. On November 17, at a promotional event for the group's single "Girls' Rule", Kashiwa and fellow first generation member Seira Miyazawa graduated from Nogizaka46.

In 2015, Kashiwa returned to the entertainment industry, modeling for the magazine CanCam and pursuing work as an actress.

Kashiwa left her agency Japan Music Entertainment in July 2022, and began working in a "completely different industry".

== Filmography ==
=== Films ===
Year	Title	Role	Production company	Source
2008	Ichi	Young Ichi	Warner Bros. Japan	

=== TV series ===
Year	Title	Role	Channel	Notes	Source
2004	Tokusō Sentai Dekaranger	Tiara	TV Asahi	Two episodes	
2004	Deep Love	Young Ayu	TV Tokyo		
2005-6	Garo	Rose	TV Asahi		
2006	Madan Senki Ryukendo	Salina	TV Tokyo	One episode	
2007-8	Negima! Magister Negi Magi	Negi Springfield	TV Tokyo		
