= Moon Pride =

Single by Momoiro Clover Z

- CD+Blu-Ray (Sailor Moon Edition) cover

Single by Momoiro Clover Z

from the album Hakkin no Yoake
- A-side: "Moon Pride"
- B-side: "Gekkō"; "Moon Revenge" (Momoclo Ed. only)
- Released: July 30, 2014
- Genre: Rock
- Length: 16:10 (Sailor Moon Edition); 25:02 (Momoclo Edition)
- Label: Evil Line Records
- Songwriters: Revo, Sumire Shirobara, Akiko Kosaka ("Moon Pride")

Momoiro Clover Z singles chronology
"Naite mo Iin Da yo" (2014)	"Moon Pride" (2014)	"Yume no Ukiyo ni Saite Mi na" (2015)

Music video
- Momoiro Clover Z "Moon Pride" on YouTube

"Moon Pride" (stylized as "MOON PRIDE") is the 12th single by the Japanese female idol group Momoiro Clover Z, released in Japan on July 30, 2014.

== Details ==
The single contains theme songs for the 2014 anime series Pretty Guardian Sailor Moon Crystal. ("Moon Pride" is the opening song and "Gekkō" is the ending song.)

"Moon Pride" was written, composed and arranged by Revo from the band Sound Horizon. The guitar solos were performed by American rock musician Marty Friedman.

The single was released in two versions: "Sailor Moon Edition" and "Momoclo Edition". The Sailor Moon Edition comes with a Blu-ray Disc featuring a music video. The Momoclo Edition is CD-only, but contains an additional song on it, a cover of "Moon Revenge" from Sailor Moon R: The Movie.

The music video was directed by Yasushi Uemura, supervised by Crystal series director Munehisa Sakai and animated by Toei Animation. It consists of a montage of video clips from Crystal. In the video, viewers could see for the first time transformation sequences of three soldiers that hadn't yet appeared in the series (in the episodes that had already aired): Sailor Mars, Sailor Venus and Sailor Jupiter.

The single debuted at number 3 in the Oricon Daily Singles Chart with the opening day sales in excess of 29,000 copies.

== Track listing ==
=== Sailor Moon Edition (CD+Blu-ray) ===
CD
No.	Title	Lyrics	Music	Length
1.	"Moon Pride" (MOON PRIDE)	Revo	Revo	3:43
2.	"Gekkō" (月虹, "Moonbow")	Sumire Shirobara	Akiko Kosaka	4:22
3.	"Moon Pride" (off vocal ver.)			3:43
4.	"Gekkō" (off vocal ver.)			4:22
Total length:				16:10

Blu-ray Disc
No.	Title	Length
1.	"Moon Pride" (music video)

=== Momoclo Edition (CD only) ===
CD
No.	Title	Lyrics	Music	Length
1.	"Moon Pride"			3:43
2.	"Gekkō"			4:22
3.	"Moon Revenge"	Kayoko Fuyumori	Akiko Kosaka	4:26
4.	"Moon Pride" (off vocal ver.)			3:43
5.	"Gekkō" (off vocal ver.)			4:22
6.	"Moon Revenge" (off vocal ver.)			4:26
Total length:				25:02

== Personnel ==
=== Momoiro Clover Z ===
- Momoka Ariyasu – lead and backing vocals
- Kanako Momota – lead and backing vocals
- Ayaka Sasaki – lead and backing vocals
- Reni Takagi – lead and backing vocals
- Shiori Tamai – lead and backing vocals

=== Additional musicians ===
- Nozomu Furukawa – electric guitar ("Gekkō")
- Marty Friedman – electric guitar ("Moon Pride")
- Kenshō Hagiwara – French horn ("Gekkō")
- Jonathan Hammill – French horn ("Gekkō")
- Atsushi Hasegawa – bass guitar ("Moon Pride")
- Yukari Hashimoto – synthesizer programmer ("Moon Revenge")
- Kōji Igarashi – piano and electric organ ("Moon Pride")
- Hana Inoue – French horn ("Gekkō")
- Gen Ittetsu Strings – string section ("Moon Pride" and "Gekkō")
- Jun-ji – drums ("Moon Pride")
- Akiko Kosaka – synthesizer programmer ("Gekkō")
- Matarō Misawa – timpani ("Moon Pride")
- Susumu Nishikawa – guitar ("Moon Revenge")
- Revo – synthesizer programmer ("Moon Pride")
- Yoshiyuki Uema – French horn ("Gekkō")
- Sachiko Watanabe – backing vocals ("Moon Revenge")

== Chart performance ==
Chart (2014)	Peak position
Oricon Daily Singles Chart	2
Oricon Weekly Singles Chart	3
Billboard Japan Hot Animation	1

== Other versions ==
The Cantonese pop group Super Girls released a cover of "Moon Pride" on May 3, 2016.

The band Pastel＊Palettes from the anime franchise BanG Dream! did a shortened cover of "Moon Pride". Arranged by Elements Garden's Ryota Tomaru, the cover was included in the game BanG Dream! Girls Band Party!.
