= Hakkin no Yoake =

Album by Momoiro Clover Z

- Cover

Studio album by Momoiro Clover Z
- Released: February 17, 2016 (Japan)
- Genres: J-pop; pop
- Length: 63:22
- Label: Evil Line Records

Momoiro Clover Z chronology
Iriguchi no Nai Deguchi (2011)	Hakkin no Yoake (2016)	Momoiro Clover Z (2019)

Singles from Amaranthus
- 1. "Moon Pride" Released: July 30, 2014; 2. "Yume no Ukiyo ni Saite Mi na" Released: January 28, 2015; 3. ""Z" no Chikai" Released: April 29, 2015

Music video
- "Mahoro Vacation" (Short Version) on YouTube

Professional ratings
Review scores
Source	Rating
Billboard Japan	Favorable

Hakkin no Yoake (白金の夜明け) is the fourth studio album by the Japanese girl group Momoiro Clover Z, released in Japan on February 17, 2016.

It was released on the same day with the group's third album, Amaranthus. According to Oricon, Hakkin no Yoake sold 81,254 units in its first week and Amaranthus sold 80,783. Hakkin no Yoake debuted at number 1 in the Oricon weekly albums chart and Amaranthus at number 2.

== Track listing ==
CD
No.	Title	Length
1.	"Ko no A, Hajimari no Z (Prologue)" (個のA、始まりのZ -prologue-)	2:32
2.	"Tōgenkyō" (桃源郷)	4:42
3.	"Hakkin no Yoake" (白金の夜明け)	6:08
4.	"Mahoro Vacation" (マホロバケーション Mahoro Bakēshon)	4:30
5.	"Yume no Ukiyo ni Saite Mi na (with Kiss)" (夢の浮世に咲いてみな)	4:41
6.	"Rock the Boat" (ROCK THE BOAT)	3:06
7.	"Kibō no Mukō e" (希望の向こうへ)	5:17
8.	"Country Rose (Toki no Tabibito)" (カントリーローズ -時の旅人- Kantorī Rōzu -Toki no Tabibito-)	5:29
9.	"Imagination" (イマジネーション Imajinēshon)	4:40
10.	"Moon Pride" (MOON PRIDE)	3:42
11.	""Z" no Chikai" (『Z』の誓い)	4:50
12.	"Ai o Tsugu Mono" (愛を継ぐもの)	4:06
13.	"Mokkuro Ninaru Hate" (もっ黒ニナル果て)	4:06
14.	"Pink Zora" (桃色空 Pinku Zora)	5:38

Limited Edition Blu-ray
No.	Title	Extra	Length
1.	"Mahoro Vacation" (music video)	Full version included only on Limited editions. YouTube shortened the music video to 2:19	4:41
2.	"Hakkin no Yoake" (documentary music video)
3.	"Documentary of "Hakkin no Yoake"" (Documentary of "白金の夜明け")

== Charts ==
Chart (2016)	Peak position
Japan (Oricon Daily Albums Chart)	1
Japan (Oricon Weekly Albums Chart)	1
