= Nippon Egao Hyakkei =

Single by Momoclo Tei Ichimon
- Released: September 5, 2012 (Japan)
- Genre: J-pop
- Label: StarChild
- Songwriter: Kenichi Maeyamada

Momoiro Clover Z singles chronology
""Otome Sensō" (2012) [re-release] "Ikuze! Kaitō Shōjo (Special Edition)"" (2012)	"Saraba, Itoshiki Kanashimitachi yo" (2012)

"Nippon Egao Hyakkei" (ニッポン笑顔百景; "Hundreds of Japanese Smiles") is a single that the Japanese female idol group Momoiro Clover Z released under the alias of Momoclo Tei Ichimon (桃黒亭一門, Momo Kuro Tei Ichimon). The single was published in Japan on September 5, 2012.

== Details ==
The first verse of the song is simply the full name of Japanese folktale character Jugemu.

The title track is the ending theme for the anime Joshiraku. The Yoshida Brothers accompany with shamisens.

== Reception ==
The CD single debuted at 6th place in the Oricon Weekly Singles Chart.

Since its release, the song was popular between Joshiraku fans and also from anime fans in general (since it was Joshiraku's ending credits rollout song), but in late March 2021, the song became worldwide popular seemingly out of nowhere, since a lot of mini-clips from TikTok came out imitating the now iconic side to side shake hip scene at the start and end of the ending credits roll out. This sudden popularity went so far that after 9 years, Momoiro Clover Z made a music video based on the song, resembling almost exactly the ending video from the anime originally came from.

== Track listing ==
All tracks are written by Kenichi Maeyamada.

No.	Title	Length
1.	"Nippon Egao Hyakkei" (ニッポン笑顔百景)	3:57
2.	"Nippon Egao Hyakkei (guest appearance: Kikuō Hayashiya)" (ニッポン笑顔百景（客演：林家木久扇）)	4:26
3.	"Mo Riff Da yo! Zen'in Shūgō" (もリフだョ! 全員集合)	4:11
4.	"Better is The Best" (ベター is the Best)	4:14
5.	"Nippon Egao Hyakkei" (Uta Nashi)
6.	"Mo Riff Da yo! Zen'in Shūgō" (Uta Nashi)
7.	"Better is The Best" (Uta Nashi)

== Chart performance ==
Chart (2012)	Peak position
Oricon Daily Singles Chart	3
Oricon Weekly Singles Chart	6
Oricon Monthly Singles Chart	11
Billboard Japan Hot 100	8
Billboard Japan Hot 100 Airplay	48
Billboard Japan Hot Singles Sales	5
Billboard Japan Adult Contemporary Airplay	36
Billboard Japan Hot Animation	1
