= Momoiro Clover Z =

Japanese band

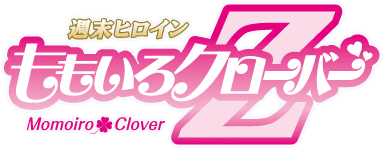

Background information
- Also known as: MCZ, Momoclo
- Origin: Tokyo, Japan
- Genres: J-pop; rock
- Years active: 2008–present
- Labels: Stardust Planet (Stardust Promotion); Evil Line Records
- Members: Kanako Momota; Shiori Tamai; Ayaka Sasaki; Reni Takagi
- Past members: Akari Hayami; Momoka Ariyasu
- Website: Japanese site English site

Momoiro Clover Z (ももいろクローバーZ, Momoiro Kurōbā Zetto) is a Japanese idol girl group, commonly abbreviated as MCZ or Momoclo (ももクロ, Momokuro).

The four members of MCZ are known for energetic performances, incorporating elements of ballet, gymnastics, and action movies.

MCZ is notable for being the first female group to hold a solo concert at National Olympic Stadium in Japan, as well as providing theme music for anime television series such as Sailor Moon, Dragon Ball, and Pokémon.

In 2013, the group grossed the fourth highest total sales revenue by a music artist in Japan, with over ¥5.2 billion. During 2016, about 636,000 people attended their live concerts, the most ever for a Japanese female group. MCZ was ranked as the most popular female Japanese group from 2013 to 2018, and 2020 to 2022.

MCZ has collaborated with other performers, including a 2015 recording with American hard rock band Kiss, marking Kiss's first collaborative recording. In 2016, their first overseas tour titled Trans America Ultra Live was held in Hawaii, Los Angeles, and New York. They sold more than 3 million physical copies in Japan.

== Members ==
External videos
- Who is Momoiro Clover Z? A short introductory video in English

On stage, Momoiro Clover Z members are easily distinguished by the colors of their clothes, similar to the characters from Super Sentai or Power Rangers. In some songs and music videos, the group loosely parodies them.

Name	Color	Birth date and age	Notes
Kanako Momota	Red	July 12, 1994 (age 32)	Leader
Shiori Tamai	Yellow	June 4, 1995 (age 31)	Nickname: Shiorin
Ayaka Sasaki	Pink	June 11, 1996 (age 30)	Nickname: Ārin
Reni Takagi	Purple	June 21, 1993 (age 33)	Former leader

Former members
Akari Hayami	Blue	March 17, 1995 (age 31)	Nickname: Akarin, former sub leader
Momoka Ariyasu	Green	March 15, 1995 (age 31)	Former child dancer of EXILE

Before the group made its debut, other girls were in the lineup: Sumire Fujishiro, Manami Ikura, Yukina Kashiwa (later a member of Nogizaka46), Tsukina Takai (later became a member of SKE48), Miyū Wagawa, and Runa Yumikawa.

== History ==
=== 2008–2009: Conception and beginnings ===
The group was formed in the spring of 2008 as a 5-member unit, originally named Momoiro Clover ("Pink Clover" or, literally, "Peach-Colored Clover"). The name was chosen to imply that the group was composed of innocent girls who wanted to bring happiness to people. Ariyasu Momoka joined the group after their first single. Later in 2011, after the departure of Akari Hayami from the group, management added the letter "Z" to the group's name. The group's slogan is "Idols you can meet right now" (いま、会えるアイドル, Ima, aeru aidoru).

Momoiro Clover began as a street act in 2008, performing for bystanders in Tokyo's Yoyogi Park. As most members were students attending school on weekdays, the group was active mainly on weekends, leading them to be nicknamed "Weekend Heroines" (週末ヒロイン, Shūmatsu Hiroin). In a one-year period, Momoiro Clover had a number of line-up changes. In March 2009, they became a five-member unit composed of Reni Takagi, Kanako Momota, Akari Hayami, Shiori Tamai, and Ayaka Sasaki.

To support and promote their first indie single, "Momoiro Punch", Momoiro Clover took advantage of school holidays from May to August and went by minibus on a long tour across Japan. They gave a total of 104 concerts in 24 electronic stores of the Yamada Denki network. The girls slept in the minivan, and group's managers drove. In the middle of the tour, Momoka Ariyasu was added to the group as a sixth member. The single was sold only at the group's live events and those sales were enough for it to place 11th in the Oricon Daily Singles Chart and 23rd in the weekly chart.

=== 2010: Major debut ===
In March 2010, the girls stated their goals: to take first place on Oricon, to participate in Kōhaku Uta Gassen, to perform at Budokan. (Note: At the same ceremony, Momoiro Clover signed a contract with Universal Records. The public contract signing ceremony featured the weighing of every member to determine if they passed the weight requirement set by the record label for idols. If the band passed the requirement, they would sign a permanent contract. Reni Takagi failed, resulting in a temporary contract.) They usually performed in a small club with live music or on a roof of a department store. They sometimes set a simulated stage of National Olympic Stadium, where notable musicians are allowed to perform.

Their first major-label single "Ikuze! Kaitō Shōjo" was released in May. The single debuted on Japan's Oricon Daily Singles Chart at the first position, and at number 3 for the week. Momoiro Clover then moved to King Records. The group's first single with King was "Pinky Jones", composed by Narasaki from the Japanese rock band Coaltar of the Deepers with a "more chaotic" approach than previous songs. December 24 marked Momoiro Clover's first solo concert at a concert hall. Nihon Seinenkan, a venue with a capacity of 1,300 seats, was sold out in 30 minutes.

=== 2011: Shift to Momoiro Clover "Z" ===
In January 2011 at the release event for a new song, sub-leader Akari Hayami stated that she had decided to withdraw from the group in April. Hayami explained that her character was not suited to being an idol and that her dream was to become an actress. At the April 10 Akari Hayami "graduation" concert, the group's management announced the name change to Momoiro Clover Z after Hayami's departure. In Japan, Z(ゼット) symbolizes ultimateness and this letter is often appended to a title (e.g., Mazinger Z and Dragon Ball Z). Z is officially pronounced as /zɛd/ (British pronunciation) when the name is used in spoken English. The band has gone on record saying in an interview that the Z in the title is a reference to the famous anime series, Dragon Ball Z stating "The Z in our name is a very obvious reference to Dragon Ball Z" and that "It's a awesome and very influential series".

Momoiro Clover Z's first single after Hayami's departure was "Z Densetsu: Owarinaki Kakumei", accompanied by a new group image and stage performance. The girls wore outfits with helmets and so-called "transformation belts" reminiscent of Japanese superhero movies, and the music video also borrowed from such "Super Sentai" imagery. In July, Momoiro Clover Z released their first album, Battle and Romance. Later in December, Hotexpress described the band as the number-one breakthrough idol artist of 2011 and stated that the album became a big turning point for them. Next February, Battle and Romance won the Grand Prix at the CD Shop Awards as the best CD of the year selected by music shop employees from all over the country. Momoiro Clover Z was the first idol group to win the award. On Christmas Day, 2011, Momoiro Clover Z gave a concert at Saitama Super Arena to their biggest audience to date: all 10,000 tickets were sold out.

=== 2012: Rising popularity in Japan ===
In May 2012, Momoiro Clover Z performed in Putrajaya, Malaysia. The former Prime Minister, Najib Razak, personally greeted the group. In June, Momoiro Clover Z opened a national tour, which closed with a sold-out show at Seibu Dome in August to a capacity crowd of 37,000 fans. Both dates were broadcast live to selected cinemas across Japan, the latter also to Taiwan and Hong Kong.

The group recorded an ending theme song for Pokémon's Best Wishes series (titled "Mite Mite Kocchichi" and included in the eighth single "Otome Sensō" as a coupling track). In July, Momoiro Clover Z performed at Japan Expo 2012 in Paris.

Momoiro Clover Z's ninth single "Saraba, Itoshiki Kanashimitachi yo", which appeared in November, topped the Billboard Japan Hot 100 chart, becoming their first single to do so. They contributed to the anime Joshiraku with "Nippon Egao Hyakkei" as the ending theme which was released on 5 September with a prior early release in iTunes Japan on 22 August.

On December 31, Momoiro Clover Z performed at Kōhaku Uta Gassen, an annual New-Year-Eve music show hosted by NHK, for the first time. Going to Kōhaku had been the group's goal for a long time. During the January 1 Ustream broadcast, Momoiro Clover Z made several announcements: that the band set a new goal for itself — to give a concert at the National Olympic Stadium, an arena with 60–70,000 capacity, that they would release a new album in spring, and that Momoka Ariyasu had to undergo a throat treatment and she would not sing or even talk until the end of January. The treatment was subsequently prolonged for another month, until the end of February. During the group's live Ustream broadcasts, Momoka communicated by drawing and writing on a markerboard. At live performances, other members took turns in singing her parts.

=== 2013: 5th Dimension ===
Momoiro Clover Z's second full-length album 5th Dimension was released in April. It sold 180,000 copies in the first week and debuted on top of the Oricon charts, with the first album Battle and Romance resurging to number two. Finally, it won a platinum disk award. In August, Momoiro Clover Z held a concert at Nissan Stadium. It has the largest capacity in Japan.

=== 2014: Dream come true ===
In March, the group held a solo concert at National Olympic Stadium, realizing one of their dreams since the debut. Such solo concerts had only been performed by six groups until then. Momoiro Clover Z was the first female group and also became the fastest group ever, which achieved that in six years. As a two-day concert, a total of 150,000 people watched in the stadium and at live viewing venues.

In May, the group released their 11th single "Naite mo Iin Da yo"; B-side "My Dear Fellow" made its debut at Yankee Stadium when it was used for Masahiro Tanaka's warm up for his first game with the New York Yankees. The group also provided the theme music for the anime Sailor Moon Crystal. The title is "Moon Pride" (the group's 12th single released in July).

In August, the group performed at Lady Gaga's concert as an opening act. It was a part of Gaga's world tour named "ArtRave: The Artpop Ball" and held in Japan. Momoiro Clover Z was selected by Gaga herself.

=== 2015: Collaboration with KISS ===
On January 28, 2015, Momoiro Clover Z released a collaboration single with the American hard rock band KISS, titled "Yume no Ukiyo ni Saitemina". It was the first time for Kiss to release a collaboration CD with another artist. In Japan, it was released physically in two versions: Momoiro Clover Z edition (CD+Blu-ray) and Kiss edition (CD only). An alternate mix of the single's title song was also included as an opening track on the Japanese-only SHM-CD album Best of KISS 40, released in Japan on the same day.

In February 2015, a joint performance recorded by Momoiro Clover Z and Rats & Star for the Fuji TV show Music Fair was removed from broadcast due to controversy over the appearance of both groups in blackface in the performance, a photo of which Rats & Star had tweeted before the broadcast date after recording. A Change.org petition had been started after the tweet by Japan Times contributor Baye McNeil, who is African American, amid conversations over racism in Japan. Amid the controversy, Momoiro Clover Z cancelled their appearance at a Foreign Correspondents' Club of Japan film screening.

Momoiro Clover Z provided the theme song, "Z no Chikai" which was released as their fifteenth single on April 29, 2015, for the Dragon Ball Z: Resurrection 'F' theatrical anime film. The group also voiced the Angels at the end of the film.

=== 2016: Amaranthus/Hakkin no Yoake and Trans America Ultra Live ===
The group released their third studio album Amaranthus and fourth studio album Hakkin no Yoake in a double release in Japan on February 17, 2016. The albums debuted at #1 and #2 in the Oricon weekly albums chart. The group held a dome trek tour for the two albums.

In early April 2016, the group announced their first overseas tour titled Trans America Ultra Live and appeared in Hawaii, Los Angeles and New York

=== 2018: 10th Anniversary Best Album ===
On January 21, Momoka Ariyasu graduated from the group, leaving MCZ with only four members. In April, they released their 18th single, "Xiao yi Xiao". On May 23, they released a new best of album for their tenth anniversary called Momo mo Juu, Bancha mo Debana.

=== 2019–present: Self-Titled Album, Shukuten & Idola ===
On May 17, 2019, Momoiro Clover Z released their self-titled fifth studio album, their first studio album to not feature Momoka Ariyasu and their first as a four-member group. In 2021, they performed the theme song for the Sailor Moon Eternal movie.

2020 to 2025 Timeline

- 2020-2021: Focused on virtual concerts and online fan engagement due to the pandemic, with special digital performances and releases.
- 2023:
  - Celebrated their 15th anniversary with a nationwide tour.
  - Released singles like "MONONOFU NIPPON" and "Chikai Mirai."
  - Collaborated with Hotei and Ken Matsudaira.
- 2024:
  - Released singles including "Brand New Day," "Heroes," and "Renacer Serenade."
  - Hosted the 8th annual song battle "Love’s New Year’s Eve."
- 2025:
  - Scheduled to headline the Kansai Collection 2025 Spring/Summer event.
  - Released "Event Horizon" as the theme song for a Gundam arcade game.

== Music style ==
The band's songs are intentionally ridiculous "hyperactive J-pop numbers". Their live performances are heavily choreographed and feature acrobatic stunts. The group is noted for their "anarchic energy" that is similar to that of punk bands. The response from the audience has been characterised as "seismic".

Some of Momoiro Clover's works are quite complex, switching from one musical style to another during one song and connecting "seemingly unconnected melodies". The group has worked with many noted songwriters and musicians, belonging to different genres of music, from pop to punk and heavy metal. Overall, the group and its music has been noted as progressive and forward-thinking. Ian Martin from The Japan Times dubbed Momoiro Clover "a pop group who provoke squealing, teenage admiration from punks, indie kids, noise musicians and heavy-psychedelic longhairs throughout the Japanese underground music scene". Momoiro Clover "is known for upbeat tunes, eccentric choreography and the members' costumes". A music critic from The Japan Times cites Momoiro Clover as an example of "a seamless integration of personality, image, and music, with each element mutually complementary".

== Discography ==
- Battle and Romance (2011)
- 5th Dimension (2013)
- Amaranthus (2016)
- Hakkin no Yoake (2016)
- Momoiro Clover Z (2019)
- Shukuten (2022)
- Idola (2024)

== Collaboration ==
Momoiro Clover Z have collaborated with overseas artists.

- Yngwie Malmsteen participated as a guitarist in "Mōretsu Uchū Kōkyōkyoku Dai 7 Gakushō "Mugen no Ai" -Emperor Style-" (June 2014).
- Marty Friedman participated as a guitarist in "Mōretsu Uchū Kōkyōkyoku Dai 7 Gakushō "Mugen no Ai"" (March 2012) and "Moon Pride" (July 2014).
- Lady Gaga designated Momoiro Clover Z for an opening act of her concert (August 2014).
- Kiss released a collaboration single with Momoiro Clover Z, titled "Yume no Ukiyo ni Saitemina" (January 2015).

The group sings the theme music for the following anime.

- Yosuga no Sora - "Pinky Jones" (November 2010)
- Dragon Crisis! - "Mirai Bowl" (January 2011)
- Bodacious Space Pirates - "Mōretsu Uchū Kōkyōkyoku Dai 7 Gakushō "Mugen no Ai‍"" (March 2012)
- Pokémon - "Mite Mite Kocchichi" (June 2012)
- Joshiraku - "Nippon Egao Hyakkei" (June 2012) in collaboration with Yoshida Brothers
- Pretty Guardian Sailor Moon Crystal - "Moon Pride", "Moon Rainbow" (月虹, Gekkō) (July 2014)
  - Pretty Guardian Sailor Moon Crystal Season III - "Fall in Love with a New Moon" (ニュームーンに恋して, Nyū Mūn ni Koishite) (June 2016)
  - Pretty Guardian Sailor Moon Eternal The Movie - "Moon Color Chainon" (月色Chainon, Tsukiiro Chainon) (January 2021, with main voice actresses: Kotono Mitsuishi, Hisako Kanemoto, Rina Sato, Ami Koshimizu, and Shizuka Ito)
- Dragon Ball Z: Resurrection 'F' - "Z no Chikai" (April 2015)
- Crayon Shin-chan: Burst Serving! Kung Fu Boys ~Ramen Rebellion~ - "Xiao Yi Xiao" (April 2018).
- That Time I Got Reincarnated as a Slime season 3 - "Renacer Serenade" (April 2024)

== Overseas performances ==
- Japan Media Arts Festival 2011 in Dortmund, Germany (September 9)
- Hari Belia Negara 2012 in Putrajaya, Malaysia (May 26)
- Japan Expo 2012 in Paris, France (July 5)
- Anime Expo 2015 in Los Angeles, California (July 2)
- Japan SAKURA Festival 2016 in Hanoi, Vietnam (April 16, 17)
- Bilibili Macro Link 2016 in Shanghai, China (July 23)
- Trans America Ultra Live 2016 in Hawaii, Los Angeles and New York (November 15–19)

== Awards ==
In 2012, their first album Battle and Romance won the CD Shop Award as the best CD of the previous year as voted by music shop salesclerks from all over Japan. It was the first time an idol (group) got this prize.

Year	Nominee / work	Award	Result
2012	Battle and Romance	CD Shop Awards — Grand Prix	Won
2013	"Saraba, Itoshiki Kanashimitachi yo"	Space Shower Music Video Awards — Special Award	Won
2013	"Saraba, Itoshiki Kanashimitachi yo"	MTV Video Music Award Japan for Best Choreography	Won
2013	Momoiro Clover Z	MTV Europe Music Award for Best Japanese Act	Won
2013	Momoiro Clover Z	MTV Europe Music Award for Best Japan and Korea Act	Nominated
2015	Maku ga Agaru	39th Japan Academy Prize — Popularity Award	Won
2015	Maku ga Agaru	The 40th Hochi Film Award — Special Award	Won

== Filmography ==
- Shirome (シロメ) - August 2010

Horror film. During filming, the girls were reportedly led to believe they were participating in a documentary about an urban legend and that everything happening was genuine.

- The Citizen Police 69 (市民ポリス69) - March 2011
- Ninifuni - February 2012
- Momodora (ももドラ momo+dra) - February 2012

5-episode internet drama omnibus film.

- Maku ga Agaru (幕が上がる) - February 2015

The five members played leading roles and later won Japan Academy Prize.
