= Yoshida Brothers =

Japanese shamisenists

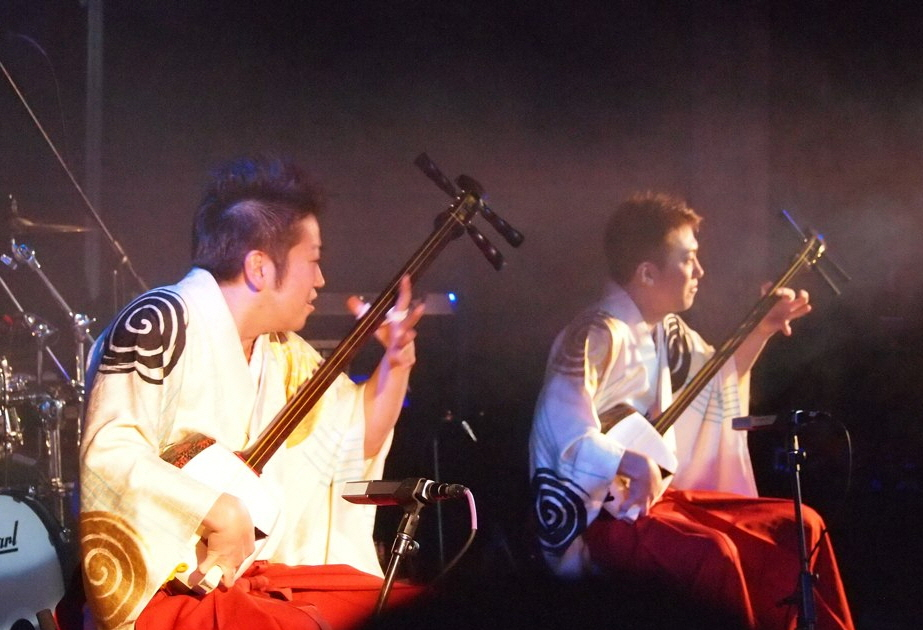

Background information
- Origin: Noboribetsu, Hokkaidō, Japan
- Genres: Tsugaru-jamisen
- Years active: 1999–current
- Label: Domo
- Members: Ryōichirō Yoshida; Kenichi Yoshida
- Website: domomusicgroup.com/yoshidabrothers/

The Yoshida Brothers (吉田兄弟, Yoshida Kyōdai) are Japanese shamisenist musicians who have released several albums on the Domo Records label.

The two brothers are performers of the traditional Japanese music style of Tsugaru-jamisen which originated in northern Japan. They debuted in 1999 in Japan as a duo playing the shamisen. Their first album sold over 100,000 copies and made them minor celebrities in Japan, a fact that surprised the Yoshida Brothers themselves. They have since attracted an international audience.

Their music has been a fusion of the rapid and percussive Tsugaru-jamisen style along with Western and other regional musical influences. In addition to performing songs that are only on the shamisen, they also use instruments such as drums and synthesizers.

The commercials for Nintendo's Wii video game console that began airing in North America in November 2006 featured the Yoshida Brothers song "Kodo (Inside the Sun Remix)".

The Japanese dub of Kubo and the Two Strings has an instrumental version of "While My Guitar Gently Weeps" performed by them at the request of Laika.

== Members ==
Ryōichirō Yoshida (吉田 良一郎, Yoshida Ryōichirō; born 26 July 1977) and Kenichi Yoshida (吉田 健一, Yoshida Ken'ichi; born 16 December 1979) were born in Noboribetsu in Hokkaido, Japan. The two brothers have played the shamisen since a very young age. They both began to study and play the shamisen at the age of five under Koka Adachi, learning the Minyō-shamisen style; from about 1989 they studied the Tsugaru-jamisen style under Takashi Sasaki.

== Discography ==
=== International albums ===
- Move (2000)
- Yoshida Brothers (2003)
- Yoshida Brothers II (2004)
- Yoshida Brothers III (2006)
- Hishou (2007)
- Best of Yoshida Brothers (2008)
- Prism (2009)
- Ibuki (2010)
- Horizon (2014)
- The Yoshida Brothers: 20th Anniversary from Debut (2020)

==== Nightmare Revisited ====
The 2008 Disney album, Nightmare Revisited, which consists of 20 remade tracks from the original The Nightmare Before Christmas, featured the Yoshida Brothers' remake of the track "Nabbed". The song kept true to the Yoshida Brothers' shamisen style yet contained added electronic elements.

12. "Nabbed" (7:35)

=== Japanese albums ===
- Ibuki (1999)
- Move (2000)
- Soulful (2002) (a.k.a. Yoshida Brothers 2003)
- Frontier (2003) (a.k.a. Yoshida Brothers II 2004)
- Renaissance (2004)

=== Other appearances ===
- "Renovation" (with Akira Inoue) from the album Spectacle. (2009) by Daishi Dance
- "Nippon Egao Hyakkei" (2012) by Momoclo Tei Ichimon (alias of the girl group Momoiro Clover Z)
