= Shiori Tamai =

- 玉井 詩織
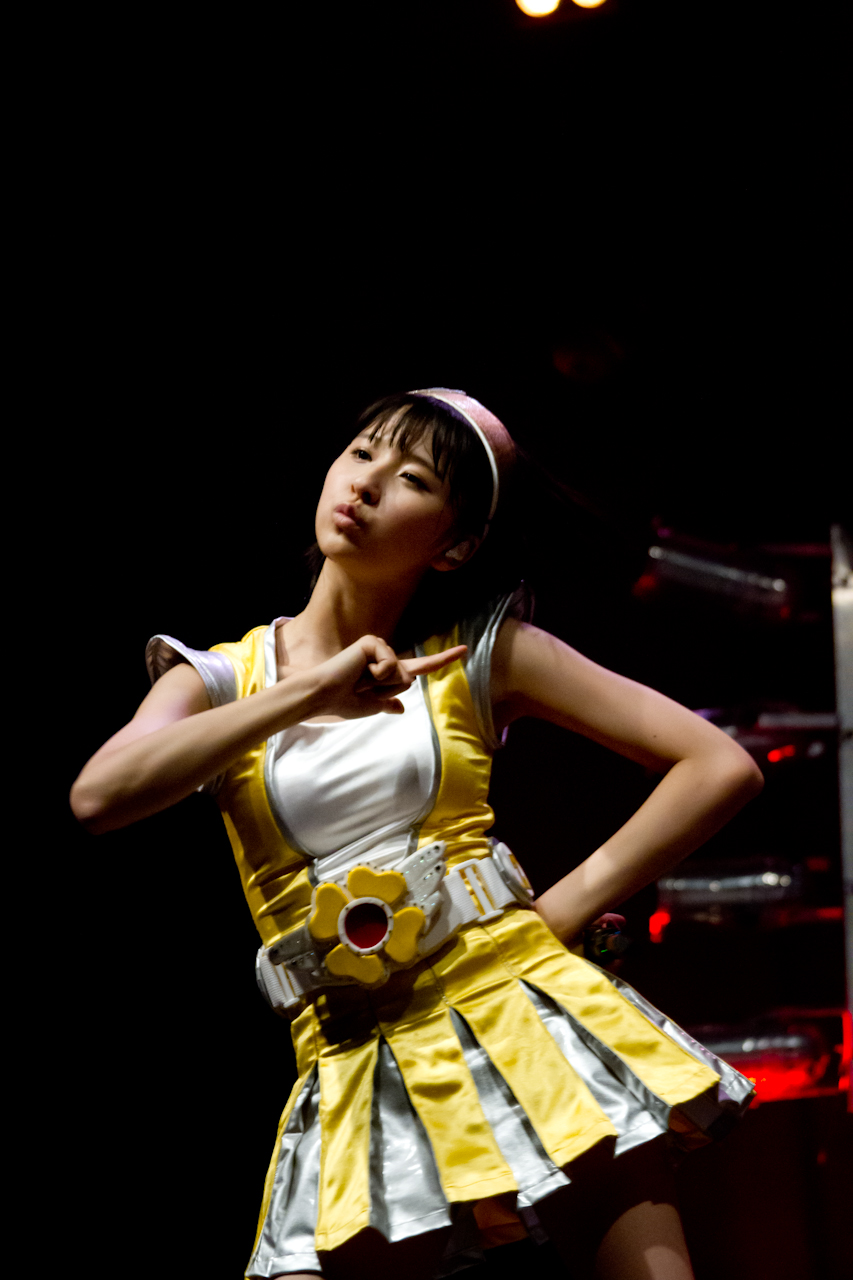
- Tamai performing at the 2012 Japan Expo
- Born: June 4, 1995 (age 31); Kanagawa Prefecture, Japan
- Other name: Shiorin (nickname)
- Occupation: Singer
- Musical career
- Genre: Pop
- Years active: 2005–present
- Label: King Records
- Member of: Momoiro Clover Z
- Website: http://www.momoclo.net/

Shiori Tamai (玉井 詩織, Tamai Shiori; born June 4, 1995) is a Japanese singer who is a member of the girl group Momoiro Clover Z. As of December 2022, she was voice acting in the Nippon Television series Akumu-chan as a personage from the dreams of Keiko Kitagawa's character.

== Personal life ==
Tamai was born in Kanagawa Prefecture. Her signature color in the group Momoiro Clover Z is yellow. Her self-introduction is "This is a spoiled crybaby, everyone's kid sister Shiori Tamai a.k.a. Shiorin" (泣き虫で甘えん坊なみんなの妹、しおりんこと玉井詩織です).

== Discography ==
=== Studio albums ===
- colorS (2024), Oricon albums chart peak position: 9

=== Video albums ===
- Momotamai Marriage Live with Kanako Momota (2017)
- Iroiro -SHIORI TAMAI SOLO CONCERT at TOKYO INTERNATIONAL FORUM (2024)
- ―30th Anniversary―SHIORI TAMAI SOLO CONCERT「Maison de Poupée」 (2025)

=== Singles ===
- "Akatsuki" (暁) (2023)
- "Another World" (2023)
- "Nichijō" (日常) (2023)
- "Eyes on Me" (2023)
- "Spicy Girl" (2023)
- "Nakuna Himawari" (泣くな向日葵) (2023)
- "Happy-End" (2023)
- "Marine Blue" (マリンブルー) (2023)
- "Sepia" (2023)
- "Hōseki" (宝石) (2023)
- "Velvet no Mori" (ベルベットの森) (2023)
- "We Stand Alone" (2023)
- "Shape" (2024)
- "Kimi ni 100-ko iitai koto ga a nda" (君に100個言いたいことがあんだ) (2025)
- "Mawaruki Mochi" (まわるきもち) (2025)

== Filmography ==
=== Movies ===
- 2010: Shirome: Spirit of the Underworld (シロメ), Shiori Tamai
- 2011: The Citizen Police 69 (市民ポリス69)
- 2012: Momodora (ももドラ momo+dra) (In omnibus format, Tamai starred in "Kamisama datte" (神様だって、))
- 2012: Spotlight (2012)
- 2012: Ninifuni (Short movie)
- 2014: Akumu-Chan The Movie, Dream Beast (voice)
- 2015: Maku ga Agaru (幕が上がる) (Yukko)
- 2015: Dragon Ball Z: Resurrection 'F', Tenshi (voice)
- 2016: Anniversary (アニバーサリー) (In omnibus format, Tamai starred in "Happy Birthday")
- 2016: Stranger ~Bakemono ga Jiken o Abaku~, Shiori Nishizaki
- 2019: Saiko no Jinsei no Mitsuke Kata (最高の人生の見つけ方)
- 2021: Tom and Sawyer in the City (都会のトム&ソーヤ)
- 2026: Bayside Shakedown: N.E.W (2026)

=== Dramas ===
- 2012: NTV Akumu-chan (voice of Dream Beast, Support Role)
- 2013: NHK G Tenshi to Jump (Mina Kawazoe (Yellow Angel, Minha) - Support Role)
- 2016: NHK BS Premium Denshichi Torimono-chō (伝七捕物帳) (Kiyoshi, Support Role)
- 2017: Hulu Manga Mitai ni Ikanai (漫画みたいにいかない) (Anmomo - Support Role)
- 2018: NHK Joshi Teki Seikatsu (女子的生活) (Kaori, Support Role)
- 2021: AbemaTV Tom and Sawyer in the City: Boku ra no Toride (都会のトム&ソーヤ ぼくらの砦) (Julius Warner, Support Role)
- 2022: Fuji TV Series Number MG5 (Nancy, "Yokohama Makusu" member, Guest Role)
- 2023: Tokai TV's 65th anniversary "Never Give Up! ～Takeshima Suizokukan Monogatari～ (ネバー・ギブアップ！～竹島水族館ものがたり～)” (Shizuka Oshima)
- 2025: JoJo no Kimyou na Bouken: Sutīru Bōru Ran (ジョジョの奇妙な冒険 Part7 スティール・ボール・ラン) (Hot Pants)

== Stage ==
- The Dinner Table Detective (2025) Reiko Hosho
