= Ayaka Sasaki =

Japanese idol singer (born 1996)

- 佐々木 彩夏
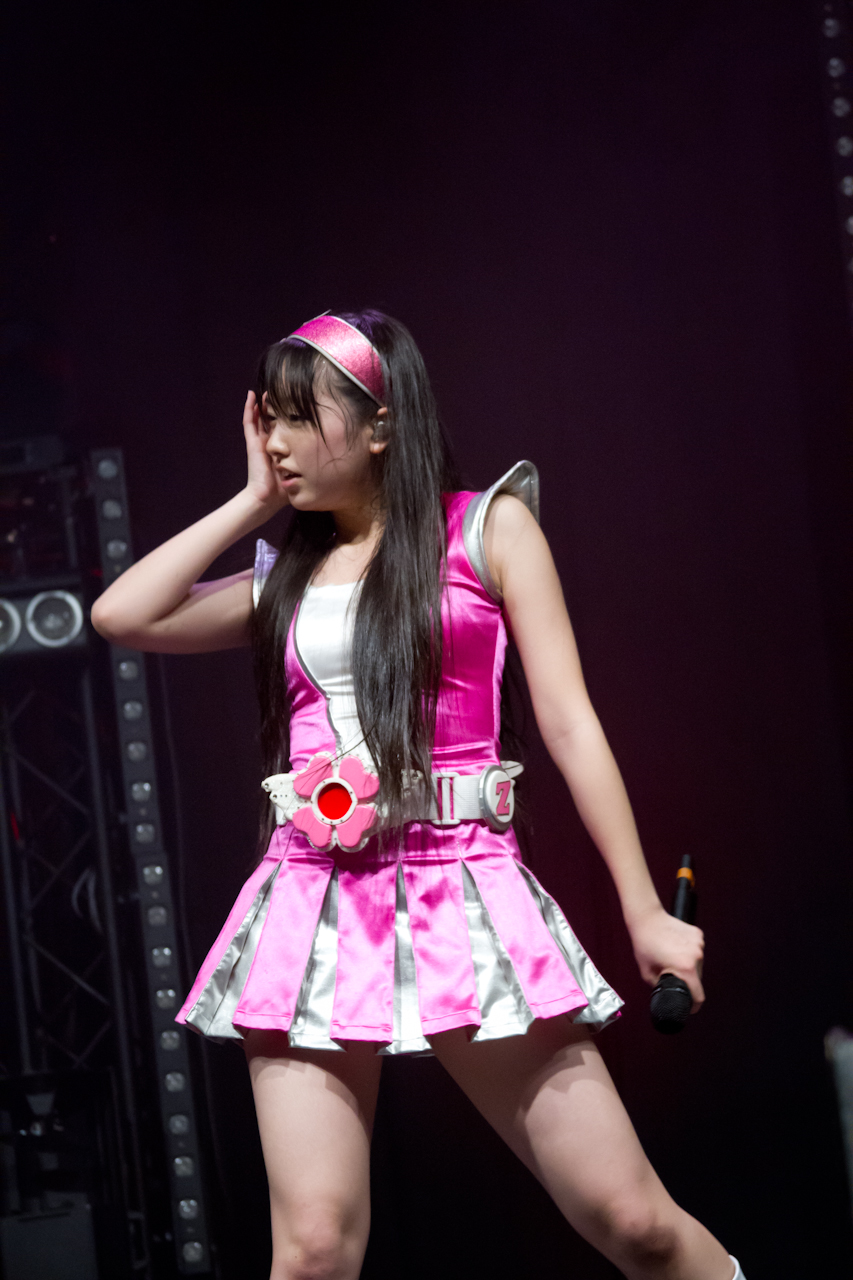
- Ayaka Sasaki performing at the 2012 Japan Expo.
- Born: June 11, 1996 (age 30); Kanagawa, Japan
- Other name: Ārin (あーりん) (nickname)
- Occupation: Singer
- Musical career
- Genre: Pop
- Years active: 2008–present
- Label: King Records
- Member of: Momoiro Clover Z
- Website: http://www.momoclo.net/

Ayaka Sasaki (佐々木 彩夏, Sasaki Ayaka; born June 11, 1996) is a Japanese idol. She is known as a member of the female musical group Momoiro Clover Z.

Her Momoiro Clover Z signature color is Pink. She is the youngest member of the group. Her self-introduction is: "I am a playful and little bit sexy idol of Momoclo Ayaka Sasaki a.k.a. Ārin!".

On July 24, 2021, it was reported Sasaki was hospitalized on July 23. She was diagnosed with right peripheral facial nerve paralysis. A concert that was scheduled for August 1, 2021 has been postponed.

== Career ==
Ayaka Sasaki was born on June 11, 1996, in Kanagawa, Japan.

Ayaka entered Momoiro Clover together with Yukina Kashiwa and Akari Hayami on November 23, 2008.

On October 12, 2012, she made a solo appearance in a special issue of the Japanese culture magazine QuickJapan. The 21-page material featuring her was titled "Summer Memories of a 16-year-old". It reported about Momoclo's summer of 2012 activities, included many photographs and a long interview with Ayaka.

Since 2019, she has also been part of the unit idol group LumiUnion (formerly named Namie Joshihatsu Kumiai (浪江女子発組合) until June 28, 2025), serving as a producer and member. In the same year, she started her fashion brand Chubby Bunny.

== Discography ==
=== Singles ===
- 2016: Aarin wa Aarin (あーりんはあーりん)
- 2017: Hen'na kitai shicha dameda yo…? (ヘンな期待しちゃ駄目だよ…?)
- 2018: Early SUMMER!!!
- 2019: Bunny Gone Bad
- 2019: Kimi ga Suki Dato Sakebitai (君が好きだと叫びたい)
- 2020: Happy Sweet Birthday! (ハッピースイートバースデー!)
- 2021: A-rin Kingdom / SPECIALIZER
- 2022: Lady Cat
- 2023: Joyful Wonderland (ジョイフルワンダーランド) / Kirarin! (きらりんっ!)
- 2024: Ladybird
- 2025: Where We Go

=== Studio albums ===
- 2017: My Cherry Pie / My Hamburger Boy (小粋なチェリーパイ / 浮気なハンバーガーボーイ)

=== Compilation albums ===
- 2020: A-rin Assort

=== Video albums ===
- 2017: AYAKA-NATION 2016 in Yokohama Arena Live
- 2018: Ayaka Nation 2017 In Ryogoku Kokugi Kan Live
- 2019: Ayaka Nation 2019 In Yokohama Arena Live
- 2021: A-CHANNEL
- 2022: Ayaka Nation 2021 In Yokohama Arena Live
- 2023: AYAKA NATION 2022 in TOKYO GARDEN THEATER

== Appearances ==
=== Movies ===
- Death Note 2: The Last Name (2006)
- Yoshimoto Director's 100 "Boku to Takeda-kun" (2007)
- Saint Seiya: Legend of Sanctuary (2014; voice of Saori Kido)
- Maku ga Agaru (幕が上がる) (2015)

=== TV dramas ===
- Niji no Kanata (虹のかなた; "Somewhere Over the Rainbow") (2004, TBS)
- Hungry! (Ep. 8, February 28, 2012, Kansai TV)
- Friend-Ship Project ~ kon'nichiwa, joyū no sagara itsukidesu.~ (Friend-Ship Project ～こんにちは、女優の相楽樹です。～; "Friend-Ship Project ~ Hello, I'm actress Itsuki Sagara. ~") (2017, TV Tokyo)
- Kotaro Lives Alone (Ep. 7, Jun 5, 2021, TV Asahi; Maid at a Maid café)
- Strange and Mysterious! Superstition Detective File - Chase the Mysteries of Curses and Curses (July 31, 2021, Fuji TV)
- TBA: JoJo no Kimyou na Bouken: Sutīru Bōru Ran (ジョジョの奇妙な冒険 Part7 スティール・ボール・ラン) (Tusk: Act 4)

=== TV variety shows ===
- Oha Star (August 2005 — September 2007, TV Tokyo)
- Kaminuma Emiko wa Mita! Nichijō Waido Gekijō (上沼恵美子は見た!日常ワイド劇場) (TBS)
- Downtown DX (ダウンタウンDX) (Special edition, January 5, 2012)

=== Internet ===
- OCN Tonay Kyō no Bishōjo Shashin Vol. 43 (OCN TODAY 今日の美少女写真Vol.43)

=== Magazines ===
- QuickJapan (Vol. 104, October 12, 2012, Ohta Publishing Co.)
