= Nana (manga) =

Japanese manga series

- First tankōbon volume cover, featuring Nana Osaki
- Genre: Drama; Music; Romance
- Manga
- Written by: Ai Yazawa
- Published by: Shueisha
- English publisher: AUS: Madman Entertainment; NA: Viz Media
- Imprint: Ribon Mascot Comics Cookie
- Magazine: Cookie
- English magazine: NA: Shojo Beat
- Original run: May 26, 2000 – May 26, 2009 (on hiatus)
- Volumes: 21
- Anime television series
- Directed by: Morio Asaka
- Produced by: Toshio Nakatani; Manabu Tamura; Masao Maruyama
- Written by: Tomoko Konparu
- Music by: Tomoki Hasegawa
- Studio: Madhouse
- Licensed by: Sentai Filmworks: NA: Viz Media (former)
- Original network: Nippon TV
- English network: NA: Neon Alley; US: Funimation Channel
- Original run: April 5, 2006 – March 28, 2007
- Episodes: 47 + 3 recaps
- Live-action films
- Nana (2005); Nana 2 (2006)
- icon

Nana (stylized as NANA) is a Japanese manga series written and illustrated by Ai Yazawa. First published as a two-part prologue in Shueisha's monthly shōjo manga magazine Cookie in 1999, Nana was later serialized in the same magazine from May 2000 to May 2009 before going on indefinite hiatus. Its chapters have been collected in 21 tankōbon volumes. The series centers on Nana Osaki and Nana Komatsu, two women who move to Tokyo at the age of 20, with the story focused on Nana O.'s pursuit for fame and Nana K.'s pursuit for romance, all while struggling to maintain their friendship.

The manga was adapted into a live-action film in 2005, with a sequel released in 2006. A 47-episode anime television series adaptation, produced by Madhouse and directed by Morio Asaka, aired on Nippon TV between April 2006 and March 2007. All Nana media has been licensed for English language release in North America by Viz Media, which serialized the manga in their Shojo Beat magazine until the August 2007 issue, while also publishing it in the tankōbon format. They released both films in 2008, and their English dub of the anime was broadcast on the Funimation Channel beginning in 2009. The anime series was later re-licensed by Sentai Filmworks in 2021.

Nana won the 48th Shogakukan Manga Award for the shōjo category in 2003. By 2019, the manga had over 50 million copies in circulation, making it one of the best-selling manga series of all time.

== Plot ==
On March 5, 2001, Nana Osaki and Nana Komatsu, nicknamed Hachi, (Note: In Japan, Nana Osaki and Nana Komatsu are referred to by their true names, as both of their names are written with different characters. In English promotions, Viz Media initially differentiated them by referring to them as Nana O. and Nana K. in promotional material until vol. 6 onwards, where Nana K. is referred to by her nickname, Hachi.) meet when Nana K. moves to Tokyo at age 20. Nana O. aims to establish a music career with her band, Black Stones, while Nana K. joins her friends and moves in with her boyfriend. Despite their contrasting personalities, the two decide to become roommates to save money on rent. Their friendship later faces challenges as they navigate love, ambition, and personal struggles.

After Nana K. breaks up with her unfaithful boyfriend, she becomes involved with Takumi, the bassist of the popular band Trapnest, complicating her friendship with Nana O., who rekindles a relationship with her ex-boyfriend Ren, Trapnest's guitarist. Nana K. also develops feelings for Nobu, Black Stones' guitarist, but upon discovering her pregnancy, she marries Takumi. Nana O., distressed by the growing distance between them, resolves to reclaim their friendship by elevating Black Stones' success.

When a tabloid exposes Nana O. and Ren's relationship, Black Stones gains widespread recognition and debuts professionally. However, their relationship deteriorates due to Nana O.'s jealousy and Ren's substance abuse, despite their engagement. As media scrutiny intensifies, Nana K. uncovers details about Nana O.'s family, including her birth mother. Before Black Stones' first tour, their bassist Shin is arrested, prompting Nana O. to pursue a solo career. Shortly afterward, Ren dies in a car accident, leaving Nana O. to grapple with grief and reassess her reliance on Nana K.

Later narrative segments reveal that years have passed, with rumors circulating about Nana O.'s alleged death. Nana K. and their friends eventually discover that she fled to England and attempt to locate her.

== Characters ==
=== Main characters ===
Nana Osaki (大崎 ナナ, Ōsaki Nana)
Voiced by: Junko Minagawa (video game); Romi Park (anime), Anna Tsuchiya (anime singing voice) (Japanese); Rebecca Shoichet (anime) (English)^{Ep. 1}
Portrayed by: Mika Nakashima
Nana Osaki is a 20-year-old girl who moves to Tokyo to pursue a professional music career with her band, Black Stones, of which she is the main vocalist. She dresses in a punk style and often wears Vivienne Westwood accessories. She develops a close friendship with Nana Komatsu, a girl she meets while traveling by train who eventually becomes her roommate.
Nana Komatsu (小松 奈々, Komatsu Nana)
Voiced by: Rumi Shishido (video game); Kaori (anime) (Japanese); Kelly Sheridan (anime) (English)^{Ep. 1}
Portrayed by: Aoi Miyazaki (film 1), Yui Ichikawa (film 2)
Nana Komatsu is a 20-year-old girl who moves to Tokyo to join her friends and her boyfriend, Shoji. She has a penchant for falling in love easily, and when she was in her third year of high school, she was in an extramarital relationship with Asano before Asano ended their relationship. Due to her kindness and faithfulness, Nana O. nicknames her Hachi (ハチ), after the dog Hachikō.^{Ep. 8} Wildly imaginative, Nana K. often blames her misfortunes on the "demon lord".

=== Black Stones ===
Black Stones, known as Blast (ブラスト, Burasuto) for short, is a punk rock band with Nana O. as the lead vocalist. Ren was once a member of the group, but, after his departure to join Trapnest, they recruit a new member, Shin. They attract a large following, and ultimately sign a deal with Gaia Records.

Nobuo Terashima (寺島 伸夫, Terashima Nobuo)
Voiced by: Tomokazu Seki (anime) (Japanese); Matthew Erickson (anime) (English)^{Ep. 1}
Portrayed by: Hiroki Narimiya
Nicknamed Nobu (ノブ), he is the guitarist of Black Stones and Nana O.'s best friend from high school. Nobu does not smoke and has a low alcohol tolerance. He also hails from a wealthy family who owns a Japanese-style inn and disowns him when he pursues a music career.
Shin'ichi Okazaki (岡崎 真一, Okazaki Shin'ichi)
Voiced by: Akira Ishida (anime)^{Ep. 1} (Japanese); David A. Kaye (anime) (English)
Portrayed by: Kenichi Matsuyama (film 1), Kanata Hongo (film 2)
Nicknamed Shin (シン), he is Black Stones' 15-year-old bassist. He initially lied that his age was 18 years old, but Black Stones let him stay even after finding out the truth. Shin is mature for his age and acts as a confidant to Nobu, while he views Nana K. as a mother figure. Because Shin was born and raised in Sweden, he is not familiar with Japanese culture.
Yasushi Takagi (高木 泰士, Takagi Yasushi)
Voiced by: Yoshihisa Kawahara (anime) (Japanese); Brian Drummond (anime) (English)^{Ep. 1}
Portrayed by: Tomomi Maruyama
Nicknamed Yasu (ヤス), Yoshihisa is the drummer of Black Stones. Off-stage, he is a trainee lawyer. Acting as the band's leader, he handles business partnerships and financial decisions needed for the band's success. Due to his maturity, he acts as an older brother figure to Black Stones.

=== Trapnest ===
Ren Honjō (本城 蓮, Honjō Ren)
Voiced by: Hidenobu Kiuchi (Japanese); Sam Vincent (English)^{Ep. 1}
Portrayed by: Ryuhei Matsuda (film 1), Nobuo Kyo (film 2)
Ren is Trapnest's guitarist. Prior to being recruited, he was Black Stones' original bassist, as well as Nana O.'s boyfriend. From a young age, Ren grew up at an orphanage with Yasu and found school boring, opting to practice his guitar alone. He is deeply in love with Nana O., but the two initially break up when Ren leaves for Tokyo to join Trapnest, as Nana O. felt that his success would cheapen her own fame. The two get back together, but Ren begins feeling that he and Nana O. have been growing distant, especially when Black Stones begins to become famous.
Reira Serizawa (芹澤 レイラ, Serizawa Reira)
Voiced by: Aya Hirano (anime)^{Ep. 1}, Olivia (anime singing voice) (Japanese); Ashleigh Ball (anime) (English)
Portrayed by: Yuna Ito
Reira is Trapnest's 22-year-old vocalist and lyricist. She is half-American and half-Japanese. She has been friends and in love with Takumi since childhood, but is frustrated that he sees her nothing more than a muse and the face of Trapnest. Reira dated Yasu for two years in high school and becomes one of Shin's clients to state her loneliness.
Takumi Ichinose (一ノ瀬 巧, Ichinose Takumi)
Voiced by: Toshiyuki Morikawa^{Ep. 1} (anime) (Japanese); Andrew Francis (anime) (English)
Portrayed by: Tetsuji Tamayama
Takumi is Trapnest's 23-year-old leader and bassist, performing under the stage name "Takumi" (タクミ). Handsome and somewhat of a playboy, he is a workaholic and dedicated to cultivating Trapnest's image, particularly Reira. He eventually enters into a relationship with Nana Komatsu.
Naoki Fujieda (藤枝 直樹, Fujieda Naoki) a.k.a. Naoki (ナオキ)
Voiced by: Anri Katsu^{Ep. 1} (Japanese); Adrian Petriw (English)
Portrayed by: Momosuke Mizutani
Naoki is the sharp-tongued drummer of Trapnest. His musical interest was awakened by Takumi during middle school. He hoped attract attention from girls by playing in the band. Naoki was the playboy of the band, tricking his bandmates to fund their cause, to which end is not explained.

=== Supporting characters ===
Junko Saotome (早乙女 淳子, Saotome Junko)
Voiced by: Takako Honda (Japanese); Saffron Henderson (English)^{Ep. 1}
Junko is Hachi's sensible and no-nonsense best friend. She is much more emotionally mature than Hachi and often pushes her to be more independent and responsible.
Kyōsuke Takakura (高倉 京助, Takakura Kyōsuke)
Voiced by: Junichi Suwabe (Japanese); Michael Adamthwaite (English)^{Ep. 1}
Portrayed by: Takehisa Takayama
Kyōsuke is Junko's boyfriend who currently shares an apartment with her. He is good friends with Hachi and Shōji. His laid-back attitude to life may deem him a slacker in their eyes, but he is actually quite perceptive.
Shōji Endō (遠藤 章司, Endō Shōji)
Voiced by: Hiroki Takahashi (Japanese); Jeremy From (English)
Portrayed by: Yuta Hiraoka
Shōji is Hachi's ex-boyfriend. During their relationship, he decided to move to Tokyo to pursue his career. He is a struggling art student and works as a waiter.
Sachiko Kawamura (川村 幸子, Kawamura Sachiko)
Voiced by: Megumi Kojima^{Ep. 1}
Portrayed by: Saeko
Sachiko is Shōji's restaurant coworker who becomes his girlfriend.
Nao Komatsu (小松 奈緒, Komatsu Nao)
Voiced by: Akemi Okamura^{Ep. 1}
Nao is Hachi's older sister who lives near the Komatsu family's home.
Natsuko Komatsu (小松 奈津子, Komatsu Natsuko)
Voiced by: Akiko Hiramatsu^{Ep. 1}
Natsuko is Hachi's mother. Kind and understanding, she is a model mother to her daughters, and Nana Osaki considers Natsuko to be cool.
Satsuki Ichinose (一ノ瀬 皐, Ichinose Satsuki)
Voiced by: Yuko Katō
Satsuki is the daughter of Takumi Ichinose and Nana K.
Takashi Asano (浅野 崇, Asano Takashi)
Voiced by: Hideyuki Tanaka^{Ep. 1}
Hachi's first lover, Takashi is a married man Asano carried on a secret affair with Hachi, which ended when he was abruptly transferred to Tokyo.

=== Music industry characters ===
==== Gaia Records ====
Gō Kanemoto (金本 豪, Kanemoto Gō)
Voiced by: Norio Wakamoto
Gō is the leader of the corporation which owns Gaia Records.
Ginpei Shiroboshi (諸星 銀平, Shiroboshi Ginpei) a.k.a. Gin (銀ちゃん, Gin-chan)
Voiced by: Fumihiko Tachiki (Japanese); Richard Ian Cox (English)
Ginpei is Blast's gay manager with an open interest in Yasu.
Mai Tsuzuki (都築 舞, Tsuzuki Mai) / "Misato Uehara" (上原 美里, Uehara Misato)
Voiced by: Mika Kanai^{Ep. 1} (Japanese); Nicole Bouma (English)
An ardent fan of Blast since its inception, Misato loves Nana and has befriended the band. However, "Uehara Misato" is not her true name. Mai claims that a fortune-teller told her that if she used the name "Uehara Misato", she could become closer to Nana, but may have actually chosen it because it is the name of Nana's half-sister. She later joins the staff at Gaia, Blast's record label.
Miu Shinoda (篠田 美雨, Shinoda Miu)
Voiced by: Saeko Chiba
Miu is an actress who shares a boarding house with Blast and Yuri. She seems to be aloof, but is sincere and perceptive enough to predict what Yasu will do. Miu quickly befriends Hachi and Nana notes after they met her for the first time.
Yuri Kōsaka (香坂 百合, Kōsaka Yuri) / Asami Matsumoto (松本 朝海, Matsumoto Asami)
Voiced by: Reiko Suhō
Yuri is a porn star who shares a boarding house with Blast and Miu and tends to speak rude. She has a large advance to pay off, but is pressured by her manager into continuing adult films when Yuri has almost paid off the debt when he promises that her new contract will allow her to star in a film adaptation of a popular novel.
Yamagishi (山岸)
Voiced by: Takaya Kuroda
Yamagishi is the security guard who guards the hostel where Blast stays in. He has the look of a gangster and frequently sleeps at his post.

==== Cookie Music ====
Mitsuru Narita (成田 充, Narita Mitsuru)
Voiced by: Sho Hayami
The head of Cookie Music, Narita is flamboyant, but reasonably talented with music. He works frequently with Takumi when it comes to Trapnest's music and marketing strategies. Narita also provides Ren with drugs (a powder which Takumi later identifies as heroin). In exchange, Ren must continue to write hit songs. It is implied that Narita introduced Ren to heroine but later regretted this after Ren had become addicted.
Mari (マリ)
Voiced by: Megumi Toyoguchi
Reira's personal assistant and manager. She is intelligent and has experience as a student at a law university.

==== Search Magazine ====
Kudō (工藤)
Voiced by: Masahiko Tanaka (Japanese); Michael Dobson (English)
Kudō is the editor-in-charge of the tabloids surrounding Blast and Trapnest. According to Arai, he is supposed to answer to a higher supervisor, Yokoyama, but he chooses to be more impetuous in his actions. He employs Miyake and Kurada to investigate in his place.
Yoshiyuki Arai (新井 良行, Arai Yoshiyuki)
Yoshiyuki is aearch magazine's editor-in-chief. He has already been married for two years. He is often the one to chide Kudou for his brash methods of investigations.
Minoru Kurada (倉田 稔, Kurada Minoru)
Voiced by: Susumu Chiba (Japanese); Richard Ian Cox (English)
Minoru is a hotographer hired by Search magazine to track Nana O. and Ren. He has conflicting opinions with his employer, Kudou, and claims that once he sees a face, he will never forget it.

=== Other characters ===
Keiichi Mizukoshi (水越 誠一, Mizukoshi Keiichi)
Voiced by: Kenji Hamada^{Ep. 1}, Takeshi Maeda (PS2 game)
Keiichi is the owner of a vintage furniture and clothing store near both Nana's apartment in Tokyo.
Sakagami (坂上)
Voiced by: Emi Shinohara^{Ep. 1}
Sakagami is a 38-year-old woman who is Hachi's boss at her new job at the magazine production industry. She is crude and scornful, and will not hesitate to throw insults at all sorts of minor imperfections that Hachi has made.
Kōichi Satō (佐藤 公一, Satō Kōichi)
Voiced by: Takahiro Sakurai (video game), Keisuke Fujii (anime)^{Ep. 1} (Japanese); Michael Daingerfield (anime) (English)
Kōichi is a waiter at the Jackson's Burger restaurant. He is friendly with Hachi, Junko, and Shōji, who all curiously address him by his full name.

== Production ==
Manga author Ai Yazawa was asked to create two one-shots to accompany the launch of Shueisha's Cookie manga magazine, and she decided to make both stories related to each other so that they would be easier to read in case they were picked up for serialization. Yazawa stated that while creating I'm No Angel in the early 1990s, she had wanted to draw a story centered on a rockabilly band. For Nana, she decided to focus on a punk band instead because she had already drawn one of the main characters for I'm No Angel with a pompadour. The series prominently features the brand Vivienne Westwood, as Yazawa herself is a fan of the brand. Some outfits featured in the series are clothing from her personal collection.

Nana ran in Cookie for 84 chapters, until May 26, 2009 (July 2009 issue), and in June of that same year it was announced that the series would be put on hiatus due to Yazawa falling ill. Yazawa returned from the hospital in early April 2010, but it was unspecified when or if she would resume the manga. During Yazawa's 2022 art exhibition, she expressed interest in continuing the series once she could.

== Media ==
=== Manga ===
Written and illustrated by Ai Yazawa, Nana first appeared as a two-part prologue in 1999 in Shueisha's Cookie manga magazine (volumes 1 and 2), a sister magazine of Ribon. Nana later started its regular serialization in Cookie on May 26, 2000 (July 2000 issue), when it was relaunched as a monthly magazine. The series went on an indefinite hiatus after Chapter 84, published on May 26, 2009. The individual chapters of Nana have been collected by Shueisha into 21 tankōbon volumes, published under the Ribon Mascot Comics Cookie imprint, between May 15, 2000, and March 13, 2009. Its latest four chapters have not been published in a tankōbon volume. In addition to Nana, each volume features a short bonus comic called Junko's Room (淳子の部屋, Junko no Heya), featuring Junko as the owner of a bar, with characters from Yazawa's works making guest appearances.

Nana is licensed for English-language release in North America by Viz Media. It was serialized in Viz Media's manga anthology Shojo Beat, premiering in the July 2005 debut issue and continuing until the August 2007 issue. The 21 volumes were published between December 6, 2005, and July 6, 2010. Viz Media added the series to its Viz Manga digital service in May 2023. On January 24, 2025, Viz Media announced that it would publish the series in a 2-in-1 omnibus edition, under the title Nana 25th Anniversary Edition. The first volume was released on October 21, 2025.

=== Films ===
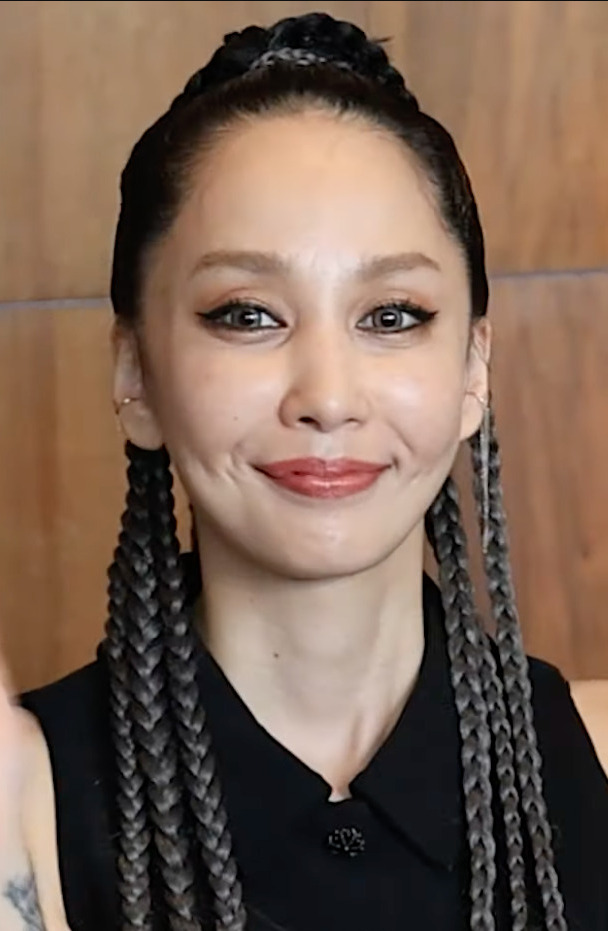
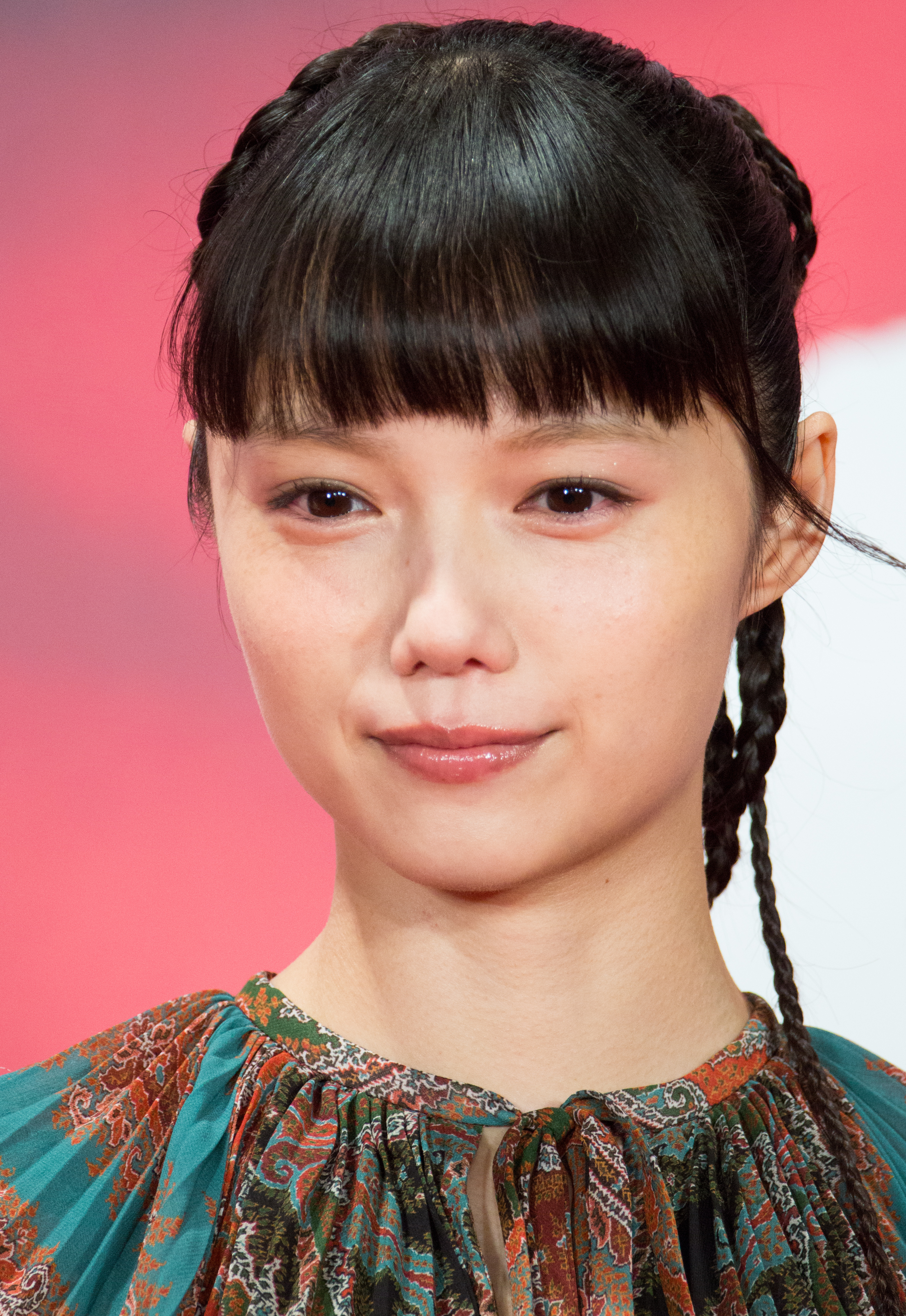
Mika Nakashima (left, 2023) and Aoi Miyazaki (right, 2017) starred as Nana Osaki and Nana Komatsu (in the 2005 film) respectively.

Two live-action film adaptations were produced. The first, Nana, was released on September 3, 2005. The film stars Mika Nakashima as Nana Osaki, Aoi Miyazaki as Hachi (Nana Komatsu), Ryuhei Matsuda as Ren Honjou, Tetsuji Tamayama as Takumi Ichinose, Hiroki Narimiya as Nobuo Terashima, and Kenichi Matsuyama as Shinichi Okazaki. The DVD edition was released on March 3, 2006. The film grossed more than ¥4 billion at Japanese box office and stayed in the top 10 for several weeks.

A sequel, Nana 2, premiered on December 9, 2006. Miyazaki, Matsuda and Matsuyama would not be reprising their respective roles as Hachi, Ren, and Shin; as such, their roles were assigned to Yui Ichikawa, Nobuo Kyo, and Kanata Hongō, respectively.

=== Anime ===
An anime adaptation of Nana was produced by Nippon Television, VAP, Shueisha and Madhouse and directed by Morio Asaka, with Tomoko Konparu handling series composition, Kunihiko Hamada designing the characters and Tomoki Hasegawa composing the music. The series aired on Nippon TV from April 5, 2006, to March 28, 2007. The first and third opening song, "Rose" and "Lucy", respectively, and the third ending song, "Kuroi Namida" (黒い涙; "Black Tears"), were performed by Anna Tsuchiya (credited as Anna inspi' Nana), who provided the singing voice for Nana Osaki; Tsuchiya also performed the ending song "Stand By Me" for episodes 45 and 46. The second opening song, "Wish", and the first two ending songs, "A Little Pain" and "Starless Night", were performed by Olivia Lufkin (credited as Olivia inspi' Reira), who provided the singing voice for Reira Serizawa; Lufkin also performed the ending song "Winter Sleep" (for episodes 43 and 44). The episodes were collected and distributed on 17 DVD volumes by VAP from July 7, 2006, to November 21, 2007.

In 2007, Viz Media licensed the anime for release in North America, and released it on four DVD box sets between September 9, 2009, and April 13, 2010, including an English dub. Funimation acquired the broadcast rights to Viz Media's dub and it premiered on the Funimation Channel in 2009. After Viz Media lost the rights, Sentai Filmworks re-licensed the series in 2021 and premiered on its Hidive service on April 22 that same year. Sentai Filmworks released the series on a SteelBook Blu-ray edition on February 22, 2022, and on a regular Blu-ray edition on May 17 of that same year.

The anime was intended to be equal to the manga, and adapted up to the first chapter of volume 12 to avoid filler. In April 2007, when asked about a continuation of the anime, Junko Koseki (editor of Nana in Shueisha) and Masao Maruyama (the then-managing director of Madhouse) stated that they had decided to wait until the manga's conclusion before producing more material.

=== Image and tribute albums ===
Nana inspired two image albums; Punk Night: From Nana, released by King Records on September 26, 2003; and Nana's Song is My Song, released by Momo & Grapes on November 6 of that same year. A tribute album, Love for Nana: Only 1 Tribute, was released by EMI Music Japan on March 16, 2005; several famous artists contributed to it, including English musician Glen Matlock of the Sex Pistols, Canadian singer-songwriter Skye Sweetnam, and various Japanese artists.

=== Video games ===
A video game adaptation for the PlayStation 2 platform was produced by Konami and released on March 17, 2005. A PlayStation Portable game, Nana: Everything Is Controlled By The Great Demon King!? (ナナ: すべては大魔王のお導き！？, Nana: Subete wa Daimaō no Omichibiki!?) was released on July 6, 2006. A Nintendo DS game, Nana: Live Staff Mass Recruiting! Beginners Welcome (ナナ: ライブスタッフ大募集! 初心者歓迎, Nana: Raibu Sutaffu Daiboshū! Shoshinsha Kangei) was released by Konami on June 21, 2007.

== Reception ==
Nana was one of the Manga Division's Jury Recommended Works at the sixth and eighth installments of the Japan Media Arts Festival Awards in 2002 and 2004, respectively. Along with Kaze Hikaru, Nana won the 48th Shogakukan Manga Award in the shōjo category in 2003. It was the top favorite shōjo manga for Oricon Style in 2005. It was nominated for the 10th Osamu Tezuka Cultural Award in 2006.

The Young Adult Library Services Association in the United States listed the series in its "Great Graphic Novels for Teens" in 2007. Deb Aoki of About.com ranked Nana as the fifth "Must-Read" shōjo manga series in its "Top shojo Manga Must-Reads" list, with Aoki stating the manga is "a beautifully-drawn series that is filled with heartfelt drama, big city glamor, fabulous fashion, rock and roll sass and many unexpected twists." She also ranked the manga in its "50 Essential Manga for Libraries" list, noting its mature themes and "demonstrates the need for an adult collection. In a survey conducted by Goo in 2012 among 1,939 people, Nana was among the top favorite manga for women. The Independent stated that part of the appeal of Nana in Japan was how it was centered on the juxtaposition between a rebellious character and a character aligned to traditional values.

The 18th volume was the second highest-selling manga volume of 2007. During 2008, the 19th volume was the third highest-selling manga volume, and the 20th was the fifth highest-selling one in Japan, selling 1,645,128 and 1,431,335 copies respectively. In the first half of 2009, the 21st ranked as the third best-selling manga volume, having sold 1.4 million copies. By the end of 2009, Nana was the sixth best-selling manga series, with 3,122,146 copies sold. The first twelve volumes of the manga had cumulatively sold over 22 million copies by 2005. By 2008, the manga had sold over 43.6 million copies. By 2019, the manga had over 50 million copies in circulation. In the United States, the 21st volume debuted ninth on the New York Times Graphic Books list for the week of July 10.

The highest average TV ratings for the anime television series adaptation was 6.3% in the Kanto region, which was unusually high for a late night anime; the record was broken by Nodame Cantabile at 6.6% in November 2008.
