= Paradise Kiss =

Japanese manga series and its adaptations

- First volume cover
- Genre: Coming-of-age; Romance
- Manga
- Written by: Ai Yazawa
- Published by: Shodensha
- English publisher: AUS: Madman Entertainment; NA: Tokyopop (former); Vertical (current)
- Imprint: Feel Comics
- Magazine: Zipper
- English magazine: NA: Smile
- Original run: March 23, 1999 – March 22, 2003
- Volumes: 5
- Anime television series
- Directed by: Osamu Kobayashi
- Produced by: Kōji Yamamoto; Masao Maruyama; Ryō Oyama; Tetsuya Watanabe; Yōko Matsuzaki; Yukihiro Itō
- Written by: Osamu Kobayashi
- Music by: Narasaki; The Babys
- Studio: Madhouse
- Licensed by: AUS: Madman Entertainment; NA: Funimation (former)
- Original network: Fuji TV (Noitamina)
- English network: US: iaTV; ZA: Animax
- Original run: October 14, 2005 – December 30, 2005
- Episodes: 12
- Live-action film
- Paradise Kiss (2011)
- icon

Paradise Kiss is a Japanese manga series written and illustrated by Ai Yazawa. It appeared as a serial in Shodensha's fashion magazine Zipper from March 1999 to March 2003, with its chapters collected in five volumes. A 12-episode anime television series adaptation, produced by Aniplex and studio Madhouse, aired on Fuji TV's Noitamina programming block from October to December 2005. A live-action film adaptation was released in Japan in 2011.

== Plot ==
Yukari Hayasaka, a third-year student at an elite college preparatory high school, is under pressure from her mother to study for her exams and enter college. On her way to school, she catches the attention of Paradise Kiss, a fashion collective of four senior students from Yazawa School of Arts: Miwako, Arashi, Isabella, and their leader, George. The students attempt to recruit Yukari as a model for their senior project at the school's upcoming fashion showcase, but she initially rejects them. Yukari later comes to understand the students' passion for fashion, admiring how they are able to live freely, and agrees to become their model.

As Yukari spends more time at Paradise Kiss' studio, she begins skipping cram school to help with sewing beads onto their dress. At the same time, she becomes drawn to George, and the two immediately fall into a whirlwind romance. Despite their mutual attraction, Yukari finds herself frustrated at George's unpredictable and twisted behavior, as well as him prioritizing career and independence over love. Inspired to be true to herself, Yukari tells her mother the truth but runs away from home and drops out of school after she opposes her decision. Yukari gets a job modeling for Miwako's sister's brand, Happy Berry, which connects her to a modeling agency, but they are unable to sign her without her parents' permission. After an encounter with George's negligent mother, Yukari begins to understand him more and returns home, convincing her mother to allow her to become a model and attending school once again.

Once Paradise Kiss completes their dress, Yukari models it at the senior project showcase. Despite the praise, they win only second place. As graduation draws near, Paradise Kiss sees little outside success and sells only one dress at a co-signment shop. Meanwhile, George is undecided about his career path, but his friend and senior, Kaori, visits him to convince him to continue studying design, which causes Yukari to become jealous. By graduation, Paradise Kiss disbands. George decides to study design in Paris and invites Yukari to come with him, but Yukari declines due to her budding modeling career. Realizing that their lifestyles are incompatible and their relationship will progress no further, the two become distant and quietly move on with their lives. Yukari hopes to become a model in Paris to be with him once again.

10 years later, Yukari is unable to become a model in Paris but pursues other career paths in entertainment in Japan. She is also married to her classmate, Hiroyuki, and they are invited to watch a Broadway show with costumes designed by George.

== Characters ==
Yukari Hayasaka (早坂 紫, Hayasaka Yukari)
Voiced by: Yu Yamada (Japanese); Julie Ann Taylor (English)
Portrayed by: Keiko Kitagawa, Sea Kumada (childhood)
Yukari is a third-year high school student pressured by her strict mother to excel academically. Her life changes when she encounters the fashion group Paradise Kiss. Initially dismissive, she grows to respect their passion and begins questioning her own path, eventually choosing to pursue modeling. She develops a turbulent relationship with the group's leader, George, grappling with her emotions and his expectations. Nicknamed "Caroline" by Miwako and "Carrie" by Isabella, Yukari eventually gains independence. After George leaves for Paris, she builds a career as a model and engages to Hiroyuki. In the live-action film, she rejects Hiroyuki and reunites with George in New York.
Johji Koizumi (小泉 譲二, Koizumi Jōji)
Voiced by: Kenji Hamada (Japanese); Patrick Seitz (English)
Portrayed by: Osamu Mukai
George (ジョージ, Jōji) is a talented fashion design student at Yazawa School of Arts, specializing in haute couture. Hedonistic and unconventional, he rejects mainstream ideals and embraces a lavish lifestyle, funded by his estranged wealthy father. Despite his cold demeanor, he forms a complex relationship with Yukari, whom he calls his muse while pushing her toward independence. His unpredictable behavior—alternately affectionate and distant—fuels tension between them. Bisexual and self-described as an "equal opportunity lover", George has a strained relationship with his mother, a former model who resents his resemblance to his father. After Paradise Kiss disbands, he moves to Paris with Isabella to pursue fashion design. He later sends Yukari a key to his stored designs, and in the live-action film, they reunite in New York.
Miwako Sakurada (櫻田実和子, Sakurada Miwako)
Voiced by: Marika Matsumoto (Japanese); Melissa Fahn (English)
Portrayed by: Aya Omasa
Miwako is a third-year student at Yazawa School of Arts who first appeared in Neighborhood Story. A member of Paradise Kiss, Miwako is the younger sister of Mikako Kouda, the protagonist of Neighborhood Story and the founder of the fashion brand Happy Berry. She carries around a jar of konpeitō candy that makes her feel better by reminding her of how she is loved.
Arashi Nagase (永瀬嵐, Nagase Arashi)
Voiced by: Shunsuke Mizutani (Japanese); Derek Stephen Prince (English)
Portrayed by: Kento Kaku
Arashi is a third-year student at Yazawa School of Arts and the son of Neighborhood Story character Risa Kanzaki. With a punk rock style and band background, he serves as Paradise Kiss's most grounded member, often providing rational advice. Childhood friends with Miwako and Hiroyuki, he harbors deep feelings for Miwako but struggles with insecurity, particularly toward academically superior Hiroyuki. His jealousy leads him to aggressively interfere in Miwako and Hiroyuki's relationship early on. Eventually, he reconciles with Hiroyuki and matures emotionally, marrying Miwako by the story's end. The two later have a daughter together.
Isabella (イサベラ, Isabera)
Voiced by: Chiharu Suzuka (Japanese); Mari Devon (English)
Portrayed by: Shunji Igarashi
Isabella is the mother figure to the members of ParaKiss. Isabella was born into a wealthy family and was the inspiration for George's very first dress during childhood, becoming his first client. She often had the habit of taking every piece of clothing that he finished. As a child, she had always wanted gorgeous dresses, and George was the one that fulfilled her wish. Isabella provides a source of support to Yukari when she needs it the most, whether it be regarding her relationship with George or choice to abandon her studies. Isabella is a transgender woman and she is mortified when anyone refers to her as her birth name.
Hiroyuki Tokumori (徳森浩行, Tokumori Hiroyuki)
Voiced by: Noriyuki Uchino (Japanese); Johnny Yong Bosch (English)
Portrayed by: Yusuke Yamamoto
Hiroyuki is Yukari's classmate, a top student aiming to become a physician. Initially the object of her affection, he harbored unrequited feelings for Miwako until Arashi intervened. Despite this, he helps Arashi reconcile with Miwako, restoring their friendship. Academically gifted but emotionally insecure, he struggles with feeling overshadowed in relationships—first by Arashi, then by George. He confesses his frustration to Yukari, admitting he prefers studying because it offers predictable success. In the manga, he eventually marries Yukari after her relationship with George ends. He is the son of Hiroaki Tokumori ("Toku-chan"), a character from Gokinjo Monogatari. In the live-action film, Yukari rejects him in favor of reuniting with George.
Kaori Asō (麻生香, Asō Kaori)
Voiced by: Miho Saiki (Japanese); Dorothy Elias-Fahn (English)
Portrayed by: Natsuki Kato
A former Yazagaku student who is now studying abroad on a scholarship received as the previous winner of the junior Grand Prize. She is noted for her talent and incredible determination. She has romantic feelings for her old friend George, but knows that he is not the type to make a woman happy. According to George's conversation with Yukari, Kaori is the only woman George cannot court and it is hinted that he harbors unique feelings toward her, whether merely those of admiration or romance.
Alice Yamaguchi (山口アリス, Yamaguchi Arisu)
Voiced by: Rumi Shishido (Japanese); Stephanie Sheh (English)
Miwako's niece. She is in third grade, and just as perky as Miwako. In the anime, she only makes a brief appearance. Alice has the same eyes as Tsutomu.

== Media ==
=== Manga ===
Written and illustrated by Ai Yazawa, Paradise Kiss was serialized in Shodensha's fashion magazine Zipper from March 23, 1999, (Note: It started in the magazine's May issue of 1999, released on March 23 of that same year.) to March 22, 2003. (Note: It finished in the magazine's May issue of 2003, released on March 22 of that same year.) Shodensha collected its chapters in five wideban volumes, released from March 31, 2000, to August 23, 2003.

Paradise Kiss features several cameos from Neighborhood Story, one of Yazawa's previous works.

Tokyopop licensed Paradise Kiss for an English-language release in North America and serialized it in its manga magazine Smile. The five volumes were released from May 21, 2002, to March 9, 2004. After Tokyopop's dissolving in 2011, New York based publishers Vertical acquired the rights to the property with plans on releasing the series in a three-volume A5 sized set with new covers, color plates and newly commissioned translation from September 2012 to March 2013. They re-released the series in a single omnibus volume as the "20th Anniversary Edition" on December 3, 2019. Madman Entertainment distributed the series in Australia and New Zealand.

The series has also been licensed in Italy, Germany and Mexico by Panini Comics; Argentina, Spain, and Finland by Editorial Ivrea; in France by Kana; in Poland by Waneko; in Russia by Comics Factory; and in Taiwan by Sharp Point Press. In Brazil, it was first licensed by Conrad Editora, but was later re-licensed by Panini Comics.

==== Volumes ====
===== Tankōbon release =====
No.	Original release date	Original ISBN	English release date	English ISBN
1	March 31, 2000	4-396-76219-4	May 21, 2002	1-931514-60-7
2	January 23, 2001	4-396-76240-2	August 13, 2002	1-931514-61-5
3	October 31, 2001	4-396-76259-3	October 15, 2002	1-59182-053-7
4	June 27, 2002	4-396-76276-3	January 14, 2003	1-59182-108-8
5	August 23, 2003	4-396-76308-5	March 9, 2004	1-59182-242-4

===== Second English release =====
No.	English release date	English ISBN
1	September 25, 2012	978-1935654711
2	December 11, 2012	978-1935654728
3	March 5, 2013	978-1935654735

=== Anime ===
Produced by Fuji TV, Aniplex, Dentsu, Shodensha and Madhouse, the Paradise Kiss anime series was broadcast on Fuji TV's Noitamina programming block from October 14 to December 30, 2005. (Note: Fuji TV listed the series air dates on Thursday at 24:35, which is effectively Friday at 0:35 a.m. JST.) It was directed by Osamu Kobayashi, who also wrote the series scripts. Nobuteru Yūki served as character designer and chief animation director, while noted fashion creator Atsurō Tayama designed the outfits and THE BABYS and Narasaki (of Coaltar of the Deepers) composed the music. The anime was licensed for release in North America by Geneon Entertainment. On July 3, 2008, Geneon and Funimation Entertainment announced an agreement to distribute select titles in North America. While Geneon retained the license, Funimation Entertainment assumed exclusive rights to the manufacturing, marketing, sales and distribution of select titles. Paradise Kiss was one of several titles involved in the deal. Funimation let the license expire in 2011.

The opening theme song is "Lonely in Gorgeous" by Tomoko Kawase (as alter ego Tommy february6). The ending theme features Franz Ferdinand's hit song "Do You Want To". Both songs appear on the Paradise Kiss Original Soundtrack released on December 21, 2005.

==== Production ====
In an interview in the January, 2007 issue of Newtype USA, director Kobayashi revealed many of the personal decisions which went into restructuring the manga into a television series. Wanting to avoid straying too far from the source material without approval, Kobayashi worked closely with Ai Yazawa on the new interpretations of the characters. In many instances, Yazawa was concerned that taking the original material straight would distract casual viewers or worse drive them away. Chief among these concerns was the handling of George's bisexual nature and interest in sadomasochism. Yazawa agreed that the dialogue should reflect this, but that actual onscreen depictions (as can be found in the original manga) were to be avoided. However, Kobayashi felt this was not being entirely true to the character, so he included a few hints of this side of George in the final episode. In another instance of modification, this time brought by Kobayashi, the character design of Arashi was modified to suit a scruffier, less slick appearance. "I wanted to make him look like Lupin the 3rd... sort of slouching and walking around with his hands in his pockets," Kobayashi explained. In agreement with the director, Yazawa went for the change.

One area Yazawa and Kobayashi did not agree on was the casting of Shunsuke Mizutani as Arashi. The fact that he was not a professional voice actor, but rather a musician, was the cause of this debate. Kobayashi had wanted a more natural performance that did not sound like the typical voice acting found in anime. "Yazawa and I even had a few rows because of that," Kobayashi explains. "But after she'd seen about three episodes, she finally admitted that Mizutani's voice is a great match, and I was able to relax."

In relation to the clothing design, despite Tayama's involvement with all of George's outfits, most of the clothing was left largely as originally depicted in the manga. Director Kobayashi had specifically requested a real designer to work on the project, and Tayama's role on the production had originally been conceived as reworking the designs to fit better with the real world, but much to everyone's surprise, the original manga designs by Ai Yazawa were already quite good. So, Tayama mostly was involved in updating the clothes to suit the very latest hot trends, and touching up the designs to make them look and behave realistically when animated. He also provided cloth samples and photographs with all of his illustrations to aid the animators with getting the textures right. Besides George's outfits, the majority of clothing for the other characters was designed by art director and stylist Asami Kiyokawa. After the rough designs were completed, texture artist Yoshikazu Suehiro drew all of the textures and lace by hand, and then scanned them into the computer and digitally applied them as textures during the animation coloring process.

==== Episodes ====
No.	Title	Directed by	Original release date
1	"Studio"; Transliteration: "Atorie" (Japanese: アトリエ)	Osamu Kobayashi	October 14, 2005
2	"Illumination"; Transliteration: "Iruminēshon" (Japanese: イルミネーション)	Motonobu Hori	October 21, 2005
3	"kiss"	Osamu Kobayashi	October 28, 2005
4	"George"; Transliteration: "Jōji" (Japanese: ジョージ)	Mitsuyuki Masuhara	November 4, 2005
5	"MOTHER"	Kenichi Ishikura	November 11, 2005
6	"NEW WORLD"	Shigetaka Ikeda	November 18, 2005
7	"Butterfly"; Transliteration: "Chō" (Japanese: 蝶)	Norihiko Nagahama	November 25, 2005
8	"Tokumori" (Japanese: 徳森)	Motonobu Hori	December 2, 2005
9	"Designer"; Transliteration: "Dezainā" (Japanese: デザイナー)	Yūichi Tanaka	December 9, 2005
10	"Rose"; Transliteration: "Bara" (Japanese: 薔薇)	Mitsuyuki Masuhara	December 16, 2005
11	"Stage"; Transliteration: "Sutēji" (Japanese: ステージ)	Osamu Kobayashi	December 23, 2005
12	"Future"; Transliteration: "Mirai" (Japanese: 未来)	Osamu Kobayashi	December 30, 2005

=== Live-action film ===
Together with the Japanese production company IMJ, Fox International produced a live-action, Japanese-language film based on Paradise Kiss; the film had an estimated budget of US$3–4 million.

The live-action film features Keiko Kitagawa as Yukari Hayasaka and Osamu Mukai as George. Other cast members are Natsuki Katō as Kaori Aso, Aya Ōmasa as Miwako Sakurada, Kento Kaku as Arashi Nagase, Shunji Igarashi as Isabella Yamamoto, and Yūsuke Yamamoto as Tokumori Hiroyuki.

The film was released in Japan in June 2011. It featured the songs "Hello (Paradise Kiss)" and "You" by Yui.

== Reception ==
Melissa Sternenberg of THEM Anime Reviews called the character designs and animation "fresh and appealing" with the closing and opening sequences "some of the best of the Fall 2005 season," and praised the animation and artwork, especially the fashion designs. However, she felt the series went wrong in cramming the story into 12 episodes, saying 26 episodes would have been better, and said that she disliked the main characters. However, she said that the sentimentality of ParaKiss seems to "accurately reflect the real fashion world".

Carl Kimlinger of Anime News Network had a more positive view, saying that apart from the established characters, the show's true star is the "costume design" which is shown in much detail, with a "delicate balancing of realism with drama." He said that the treatment of the series is "unusually thoughtful", and that the series is "about being young...having dreams...[and] romance." He called the series a "refreshingly mature story", but said it is not for "those in search of reassuring escapism."

In 2024, through a survey of 100 people by TV Maga (a web magazine operated by TV Log), Paradise Kiss was voted second for most fashionable manga, along with Neighborhood Story, another series by Yazawa.
