= Gokinjo =

Gokinjo (ご近所) is the Japanese word for "neighborhood". Its use can refer to titles such as:

- Gokinjo Bōkentai, a 1996 video game
- Gokinjo Monogatari, a Japanese manga series
