= Nazca (TV series) =

Japanese anime television series

時空転抄ナスカ (Jikū Tenshō Nasuka)
- Genre: Adventure, fantasy, mythological
- Created by: Yoshihiko Inamoto
- Manga
- Written by: Akira Himekawa
- Published by: Kadokawa Shoten
- Magazine: Ace Dash
- Original run: 1997 – 1998
- Volumes: 2
- Anime television series
- Directed by: Hiroko Tokita
- Produced by: Motoki Ueda; Yasuyuki Ueda
- Written by: Naruhisa Arakawa; Tsunehisa Ito; Katsuyuki Sumisawa
- Music by: Tsuneyoshi Saito
- Studio: Radix
- Licensed by: NA: Geneon
- Original network: TV Tokyo
- Original run: April 6, 1998 – June 23, 1998
- Episodes: 12

Nazca (時空転抄ナスカ, Jikū Tenshō Nasuka; lit. Nazca: Dimensional Transfer) is an anime series created by Yoshihiko Inamoto. It is about a group of people who are reincarnations of ancient Inca warriors who have returned to re-enact a civil war that resulted in the fall of the Inca Empire.

== Plot ==
Miura Kyoji, a dedicated kendo student, discovers that his instructor, Tate Masanari, is a reincarnated Inca warrior named Yawaru who wishes to destroy the world to purify it. Kyoji himself is the warrior Bilka, who foiled Yawaru's plans in their previous lives. As Yawaru gathers other awakened spirits such as from Kyoji's friends & enemies to give him ever more power, Kyoji faces conflicting loyalties; he must decide if he is merely a vessel for the reincarnated soul, destined to fulfill a role given to him and destroy a person he liked and respected in order to save the world, or if he is a free individual who can bring Masanari to his senses and break the cycle of rebirth and human possession. Kyoji gathers his girlfriend; Tate's ex-fiancé, Yuka Kiritake, his best friend Dan Takuma, & Dan's friend Seino Keita to stop Tate's/Yawaru's mission, while Tate gathers Kyoji's best friend, Daimon, Kyoji & Dan's rival, Shiogami, Shiogami's half-sister, Tatsuko, and Garos, another reborn God to stop Kyoji, Yuka, Dan & Seino's interference. They all travel to Asuka to release or prevent Iryatesse, a source of power & energy for all that lives on Earth. Tate/Yawaru plans to release Iryatesse in order to create his ideal world, which will also cause the deaths of millions. Kyoji/Bilka & his friends plan to stop him, so that they can protect their futures.

== Manga ==
No.	Release date	ISBN
1	May 27, 1998	978-4047132238
2	May 25, 1999	978-4047132672

== Episodes list ==
No.	Title	Written by	Original release date
1	"Those Who Awaken"; Transliteration: "Mezaméshi Monotachi" (Japanese: 目覚めし者たち - Despertar)	Tsunehisa Ito	April 6, 1998
2	"Reunion in the Andes"; Transliteration: "Andesu no Kaigō" (Japanese: アンデスの邂逅 - Encuentro)	Tsunehisa Ito	April 13, 1998
3	"Meeting of the Sleeping Souls"; Transliteration: "Tamashī Hito no Shundō" (Japanese: 魂人の蠢動 - Actividad)	Tsunehisa Ito	April 20, 1998
4	"Tears and Farewell!"; Transliteration: "Namida! Soshite Ketsubetsu!" (Japanese: 涙! そして決別！ - Lágrimas)	Katsuyuki Sumisawa	April 27, 1998
5	"Iriyatesse"; Transliteration: "Irya Tesse" (Japanese: イリャ・テッセ - Irra Tezze)	Tsunehisa Ito	May 4, 1998
6	"Decisive Battle in an Empty Town!"; Transliteration: "Kessen! Kyomu no Machi" (Japanese: 決戦! 虚無の街 - ¡Batalla decisiva!)	Naruhisa Arakawa	May 11, 1998
7	"Memory, Separate Ways"; Transliteration: "Kioku… Sorezore no Futari" (Japanese: 記憶… それぞれの二人 - Memoria de cada uno)	Naruhisa Arakawa	May 18, 1998
8	"The Promised Land"; Transliteration: "Yakusoku no Chi Asuka e" (Japanese: 約束の地・アスカへ - La tierra de Promisión)	Katsuyuki Sumisawa	May 25, 1998
9	"Light Chasing Darkness"; Transliteration: "Yami o ō Hikari" (Japanese: 闇を追う光 - Luz y oscuridad)	Naruhisa Arakawa	June 2, 1998
10	"Beyond Light, Towards Tomorrow"; Transliteration: "Akari no Mukō no Ashita e" (Japanese: 灯の向こうの明日へ - Mi profesor)	Naruhisa Arakawa	June 9, 1998
11	"Towards the Final Fate!"; Transliteration: "Unmei no Itadaki ni Mukatte" (Japanese: 運命の頂に向かって - Punto mas suerte)	Naruhisa Arakawa	June 16, 1998
12	"And for the Future!"; Transliteration: "Soshite Mirai no Tame ni!" (Japanese: そして未来のために！ - ¡Mañana!)	Naruhisa Arakawa	June 23, 1998

== Popular culture ==
Two clips from episode 3 of Nazca are used in the opening titles of the American sitcom Malcolm in the Middle.
