= Mirai Bowl / Chai Maxx =

- Regular Edition's cover

Single by Momoiro Clover

from the album Battle and Romance
- B-side: "Zenryoku Shōjo (Regular Edition)"
- Released: March 9, 2011 (Japan)
- Genre: J-pop
- Label: Starchild

Momoiro Clover singles chronology
"Pinky Jones" (2010)	"Mirai Bowl / Chai Maxx" (2011)	"Z Densetsu (Owarinaki Kakumei)" (2011)

Music videos
- "Mirai Bowl" on YouTube
- "Chai Maxx" on YouTube
- "Chai Maxx" (dance cover) on YouTube

"Mirai Bowl / Chai Maxx" (ミライボウル／Chai Maxx, Mirai Bōru/Chai Makkusu) is the 3rd major-label single by the Japanese female idol group Momoiro Clover, released in Japan on March 9, 2011. It was the last to feature former member Hayami Akari.

== Track listing ==
=== Limited Editions A, B ===
CD
No.	Title	Length
1.	"Mirai Bowl" (ミライボウル Mirai Bōru)	4:25
2.	"Chai Maxx"	4:34
3.	"Mirai Bowl" (off vocal ver.)
4.	"Chai Maxx" (off vocal ver.)

Limited Edition A DVD
No.	Title	Length
1.	"Mirai Bowl" (Music Video)
2.	"Flash anime" (「FLASHアニメ「週末お届け! ももクロ便 〜不毛な戦い篇〜」)

Limited Edition B DVD
No.	Title	Length
1.	"Chai Maxx" (Music Video)
2.	"Flash anime" (「FLASHアニメ「週末お届け! ももクロ便 〜不毛な戦い篇〜」)

=== Regular Edition ===
CD
No.	Title	Length
1.	"Mirai Bowl" (ミライボウル)	4:25
2.	"Chai Maxx"	4:34
3.	"Zenryoku Shōjo" (全力少女)	4:26
4.	"Mirai Bowl" (off vocal ver.)
5.	"Chai Maxx (instrumental)" (off vocal ver.)
6.	"Zenryoku Shōjo (instrumental)" (off vocal ver.)

== Chart performance ==
Chart (2011)	Peak position
Oricon Weekly Singles Chart	3
Oricon Monthly Singles Chart	13
Billboard Japan Hot 100	12
Billboard Japan Hot Singles Sales	3
