= Nana (2005 film) =

- Theatrical release poster
- Directed by: Kentarō Ōtani
- Screenplay by: Taeko Asano; Kentarō Ōtani
- Based on: Nana by Ai Yazawa
- Starring: Mika Nakashima; Aoi Miyazaki
- Cinematography: Kazuhiro Suzuki
- Edited by: Shuichi Kakesu
- Music by: Tadashi Ueda
- Production companies: Aniplex; IMJ Entertainment; Mainichi Broadcasting System; Sedic International; Shueisha; Toho; Tokyo Broadcasting System; True Project Company Ltd.
- Distributed by: Toho
- Release date: September 3, 2005 (Japan)
- Running time: 113 minutes
- Country: Japan
- Language: Japanese
- Box office: $34,671,042

Nana (Japanese: ナナ) is a 2005 Japanese drama film directed by Kentarō Ōtani. Based on the manga of the same name by Ai Yazawa, the film stars Mika Nakashima as Nana Osaki and Aoi Miyazaki as Nana "Hachi" Komatsu. The film was released on September 3, 2005.

The film was followed by a sequel, Nana 2, in 2006. Nakashima reprised her role as Nana Osaki, but some of the original cast, including Miyazaki and Ryuhei Matsuda, did not reprise their roles.

== Synopsis ==
Nana is about the relationship between two young women who are both named Nana. Although their names are the same, their lives are completely different. One of them, Nana Osaki (Mika Nakashima), is an ambitious punk who is looking to break into the world of rock and roll, while the other, Nana "Hachi" Komatsu (Aoi Miyazaki), simply wants a new life with her boyfriend, Shoji Endo (Yūta Hiraoka). After moving to Tokyo while chasing their hopes and dreams, their lives greatly change after meeting each other.

== Cast ==
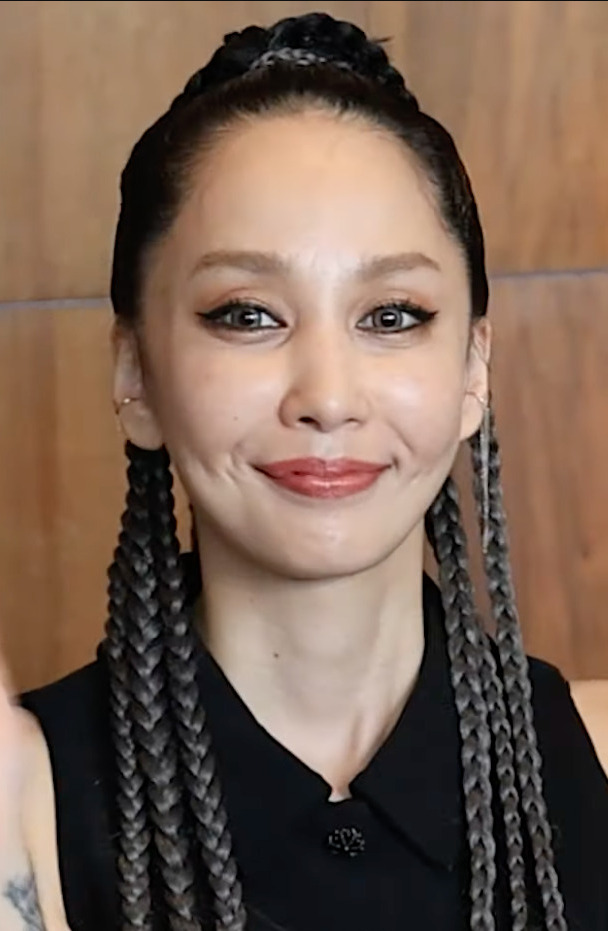
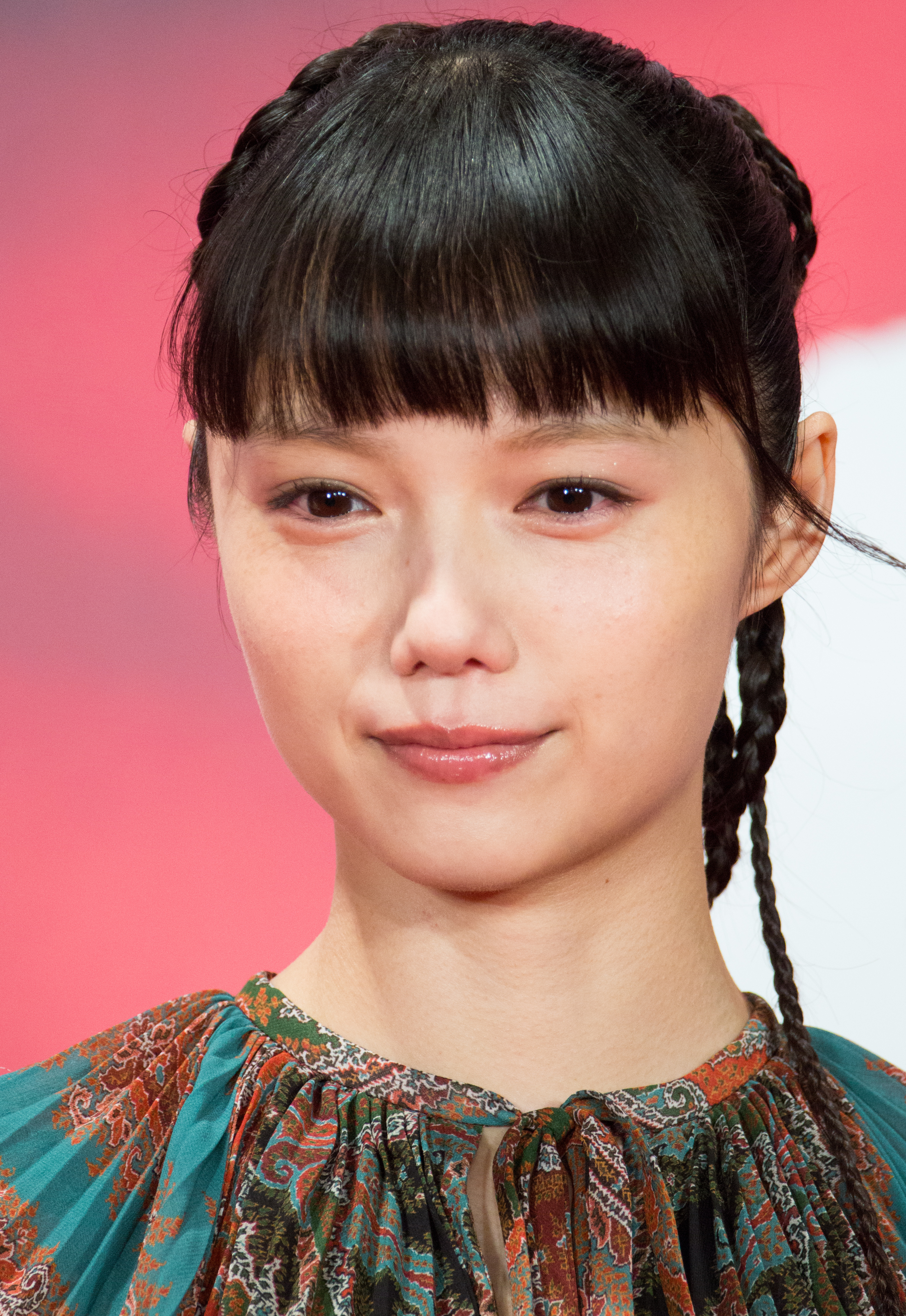
Mika Nakashima (left, 2023) and Aoi Miyazaki (right, 2017) starred as Nana Osaki and Nana Komatsu respectively.
- Mika Nakashima - Nana Osaki
- Aoi Miyazaki - Nana "Hachi" Komatsu
- Hiroki Narimiya - Nobuo Terashima
- Kenichi Matsuyama - Shin
- Ryuhei Matsuda - Ren Honjo
- Yuna Ito - Reira Serizawa
- Saeko - Sachiko
- Momosuke Mizutani - Naoki
- Anna Nose - Junko
- Takehisa Takayama - Kyosuke
- Tomomi Maruyama - Yasu
- Tetsuji Tamayama - Takumi
- Yūta Hiraoka - Shoji Endo
- Gou Ayano

== DVD ==
The DVD edition was released on March 3, 2006.

== Reception ==
The film grossed $33,154,571 at the Japanese box office and stayed in the top 10 for several weeks.

== Theme songs ==
In addition to creating a Nana craze throughout Asia, the film also helped launch Mika Nakashima to the peak of her career as she released the single "Glamorous Sky" under the name Nana starring Mika Nakashima. The single created topicality with its special collaboration between Nakashima, Hyde (who wrote the music for the song), and Nana author Yazawa Ai (who wrote the lyrics). The single became Nakashima's first number one single on the Oricon charts. It was also featured in Osu! Tatakae! Ōendan 2 and Konami's drum simulation game Drum Mania.

The film also helped promote another artist, Yuna Ito, who starred in the film as Trapnest vocal Reira, released her debut single "Endless Story," the insert song of the film, under the name Reira starring Yuna Ito. The single ranked second on the Oricon charts, next to Nakashima's "Glamorous Sky," and made Yuna Ito one of the most successful debuting artists of 2005.
