= Descendants of Darkness =

Manga

- Cover of the first volume

闇の末裔 (Yami no Matsuei)
- Genre: Dark fantasy; Mystery; Supernatural
- Manga
- Written by: Yoko Matsushita
- Published by: Hakusensha
- English publisher: NA: Viz Media
- Magazine: Hana to Yume
- Original run: June 20, 1996 – present
- Volumes: 13
- Anime television series
- Directed by: Hiroko Tokita
- Music by: Tsuneyoshi Saito
- Studio: J.C.Staff
- Licensed by: NA: Discotek Media
- Original network: Wowow
- English network: CA: Super Channel; SEA: AXN; US: AZN Television, Syfy
- Original run: October 2, 2000 – December 18, 2000
- Episodes: 13

Descendants of Darkness (Japanese: 闇の末裔, Hepburn: Yami no Matsuei) is a Japanese manga series written and illustrated by Yoko Matsushita. The story revolves around shinigami. These Guardians of Death work for Enma Daiō, the king of the dead, sorting out the expected and unexpected arrivals to the Underworld.

An anime television series adaptation by J.C.Staff aired on Wowow from October to December 2000.

== Plot ==
Asato Tsuzuki has been a 'Guardian of Death' for over 70 years. He has the power to call upon twelve shikigami, mythical creatures that aid him in battle. The manga portrays Tsuzuki's relationship with the shinigami in much more detail. Tsuzuki is the senior partner of the Second Division, which watches over the region of Kyūshū.

In the anime, the story begins when Chief Konoe, the boss, and the other main characters discussing recent murders in Nagasaki. The victims all have bite marks and a shortage of blood, which leads to the case being known as "The Vampire Case."

After some food troubles, Tsuzuki travels to Nagasaki with Gushoshin, a flying creature/helper who can speak, and together they do a bit of investigating. The rule is that Guardian of Death are supposed to work in pairs, and until Tsuzuki meets up with his new partner, he needs someone to watch him. However, Gushoshin gets held back by groceries, and Tsuzuki is on his own.

While exploring Nagasaki, Tsuzuki hears a scream and has a run-in with a strange white-haired woman with red eyes, who leaves blood on his collar. Taking this as is a sign that the woman might be the vampire, Tsuzuki tries to follow her. He comes to a church called Oura Cathedral, where he meets the story's primary antagonist, Muraki.

Doctor Kazutaka Muraki is initially portrayed as a pure figure, with much religious and color symbolism. He meets Tsuzuki with tears in his eyes and Tsuzuki, thrown off, asks if Muraki has seen a woman recently. Muraki says no body has been in the church, and Tsuzuki leaves. Tsuzuki later learns that the woman that he encountered is Maria Won, a famous singer from China.

From there Tsuzuki continues through Nagasaki into the area of the city known as Glover Garden, where he is held at gunpoint from behind. His attacker tells him to turn around, and when he does, he discovers a young man glaring at him. He suspects this man is the vampire. Tsuzuki is then saved by Gushoshin. Afterwards Tsuzuki learns that the boy is Hisoka Kurosaki, his new partner, and the rest of the story is heavily based on character development and the relationships between characters.

Later in the Nagasaki Arc (the first fourth of the anime series, and the first collection of the manga), Hisoka is kidnapped by Muraki, and the truth about his death is revealed. Tsuzuki rescues him after his "date" with Muraki, and the series follows the relationship between these three characters, supported and embellished by the rest of the cast.

== Media ==
=== Manga ===
The manga was serialized in Hakusensha's semi-monthly shōjo manga magazine, Hana to Yume from the 14th issue of 1996 until the author decided to put the story on hiatus in the 2nd issue of 2003. The published chapters have been collected in 12 volumes with the 12th volume published on January 19, 2010 with revisions that differ from the chapters originally serialized in the magazine. The series resumed serialization in Hana to Yume magazine in the September 2011 issue. The English-language version is published by Viz Media that originally released the first volume on September 14, 2004, and the eleventh on May 2, 2006. From volume 10 onwards the English edition adjusts the chapter enumeration, giving the Japanese and English editions different chapter numbers.

No.	Original release date	Original ISBN	English release date	English ISBN
1	19 September 1997	4592124464	September 14, 2004	1591165075
"Two on the River's Edge" (むこう岸の2人, "Mukō kishi no futari"); "Descendants of Darkness" (闇の末裔, "Yami no matsuei"); "A Fairy Tale" (フェアリー・テイル, "Fearī teiru"); "The Ministry of Hades: Orientation" (十王町基礎講座, "Jūō-chō kiso kōza")
2	12 December 1997	459217402X	November 8, 2004	1591165970
"The Last Waltz" (ラストワルツ, "Rasuto Warutsu"); "The Devil's Trill" (悪魔のトリル, "Akuma no toriru")
3	19 March 1998	4592174038	January 11, 2005	1591164605
"The Sword of K" (スォードのK, "Swōdo no K"): Chapter 1 (第1回); Chapter 2 (第2回); Chapter 3 (第3回); Chapter 4 (第4回); Chapter 5 (第5回); Chapter 6 (第6回); "The Ministry of Hades: Orientation II" (十王町基礎講座, "Jūō-chō kiso kōza")
4	17 July 1998	4592174046	March 15, 2005	1591167027
"Descendants of Darkness" (闇の末裔, "Yami no matsuei"): Chapter 1 (第1回); Chapter 2 (第2回); Chapter 3 (第3回); Chapter 4 (第4回); Chapter 5 (第5回); Chapter 6 (第6回); "Afterward" (あとがき, "Atogaki")
5	19 October 1998	4592174054	May 17, 2005	1591167787
Chapter 7 (第7回); Chapter 8 (第8回); Chapter 9 (第9回); Chapter 10 (第10回); Chapter 11 (第11回); Chapter 12 (第12回); "Atogaki (Afterword)" (あとがき, "Atogaki")
6	19 February 1999	4592174062	July 12, 2005	1591168422
Chapter 13 (第13回); Chapter 14 (第14回); Chapter 15 (第15回); Chapter 16 (第16回); Chapter 17 (第17回); "The Kids and I" (お子様と私＜番外編＞, "Okosama to watashi" (Bangai-hen)); "Character Profiles" (キャラクタープロフィール集, "Kyarakutā purofīru-shū")
7	19 May 1999	4592174070	September 8, 2005	1591169836
Chapter 18 (第18回); Chapter 19 (第19回); Chapter 20 (第20回); Chapter 21 (第21回); Chapter 22 (第22回); Chapter 23 (第23回)
8	14 December 1999	4592174089	November 8, 2005	1421501155
Chapter 24 (第24回); Chapter 25 (第25回); Chapter 26 (第26回); Chapter 27 (第27回); Bonus: "Professor Watari's Road to Discovery" (亘理博士の発明王への道＜番外編＞, "Watari-hakase no hatsumei-ō e no michi" (Bangai-hen))
9	19 July 2000	4592174097	January 10, 2006	1421501716
Chapter 28 (第28回); Chapter 29 (第29回); Chapter 30 (第30回); Chapter 31 (第31回); Chapter 32 (第32回); Chapter 33 (第33回); Chapter 34 (第34回); Chapter 35 (第35回); Chapter 36 (第36回)
10	14 December 2000	4592174100	March 14, 2006	1421503212
Chapter 37 (第37回); Chapter 38 (第39回); Chapter 39 (第40回); Chapter 40 (第41回); Chapter 41 (第42回); Chapter 42 (第43回); Chapter 43 (第44回); Chapter 44 (第45回); Chapter 45 (第46回); "Afterword" (あとがき, "Atogaki")
11	December 14, 2001	4592174119	May 2, 2006	1421505363
Chapter 46 (第47回); Chapter 47 (第48回); Chapter 48 (第49回); Chapter 49 (第50回); Chapter 50 (第51回); Chapter 51 (第52回); Chapter 52 (第53回); Chapter 53 (第54回)
12	January 19, 2010	9784592174165	—	—
第55回; 第56回; 第57回; 第58回; 第59回; 第60回; 第61回; 第62回; 第63回
13	July 20, 2017	9784592194170	—	—

=== Anime ===
An anime adaptation of the manga aired on WOWOW beginning on October 10, 2000, to June 24, 2001. The anime was directed by Hiroko Tokita and was animated by J.C. Staff. The series was divided by four story arcs. Central Park Media had licensed the series and released them on DVD in 2003. The series initially aired on AZN Television in 2004. In 2008, the series, along with a few other CPM titles, was aired on Sci-Fi Channel's Ani-Monday block in 2008 and then on their sister network Chiller in 2009. In Canada, the anime series was shown on Super Channel 2 beginning on December 8, 2008. Discotek Media has since licensed the anime and will re-release the series in 2015. The series opening theme is "Eden" by To Destination, while the closing theme is "Love Me" by The Hong Kong Knife.

No.	Title	Original air date	English air date
1	"The Nagasaki File (Part 1)"; Transliteration: "Nagasaki Hen 1" (Japanese: 長崎編①)	October 2, 2000	November 4, 2008
2	"The Nagasaki File (Part 2)"; Transliteration: "Nagasaki Hen 2" (Japanese: 長崎編②)	October 9, 2000	November 4, 2008
3	"The Nagasaki File (Part 3)"; Transliteration: "Nagasaki Hen 3" (Japanese: 長崎編③)	October 16, 2000	November 11, 2008
4	"The Devil's Trill (Part 1)"; Transliteration: "Akuma no Trill Hen 1" (Japanese: 悪魔のトリル編①)	October 23, 2000	November 25, 2008
5	"The Devil's Trill (Part 2)"; Transliteration: "Akuma no Trill Hen 2" (Japanese: 悪魔のトリル編②)	October 30, 2000	November 25, 2008
6	"The Devil's Trill (Part 3)"; Transliteration: "Akuma no Trill Hen 3" (Japanese: 悪魔のトリル編③)	November 6, 2000	December 1, 2008
7	"The King of Swords (Part 1)"; Transliteration: "Sword no K Hen 1" (Japanese: スォードのK編①)	November 13, 2000	December 1, 2008
8	"The King of Swords (Part 2)"; Transliteration: "Sword no K Hen 2" (Japanese: スォードのK編②)	November 20, 2000	December 8, 2008
9	"The King of Swords (Part 3)"; Transliteration: "Sword no K Hen 3" (Japanese: スォードのK編③)	November 27, 2000	December 8, 2008
10	"The Kyōto File (Part 1)"; Transliteration: "Kyouto Hen 1" (Japanese: 京都編①)	December 4, 2000	December 15, 2008
11	"The Kyōto File (Part 2)"; Transliteration: "Kyouto Hen 2" (Japanese: 京都編②)	December 11, 2000	December 15, 2008
12	"The Kyōto File (Part 3)"; Transliteration: "Kyouto Hen 3" (Japanese: 京都編③)	December 18, 2000	December 22, 2008
13	"The Kyōto File (Part 4)"; Transliteration: "Kyouto Hen 4" (Japanese: 京都編④)	December 18, 2000	December 22, 2008

== Reception ==
Descendants of Darkness has been called "a gateway drug into shōnen-ai and yaoi" despite it not really being as such. Anime News Network praised the TV series' humor. Descendants of Darkness sold 10,000 copies in its first few months on the English-language market. Volume 5 of the series ranked 6th in the week ending of May 22, 2005, according to BookScan's Graphic Novel List.
