= My Pretend Girlfriend =

- Poster
- Directed by: Saiji Yakumo
- Screenplay by: Kyoko Inukai
- Based on: Momose, Kotchi o Muite by Eiichi Nakata
- Produced by: Naomi Akashi; Kumi Kobata; Sekine Takeharu
- Starring: Akari Hayami; Osamu Mukai; Tarou Takeuchi; Anna Ishibashi; Asuka Kudo
- Cinematography: Shuhei Umene
- Edited by: Maho Inamoto
- Production companies: Robot Communications; Happinet; Nippon BS Broadcasting; Suurkiitos; Sony PCL; Tsutaya Group; Tokyu Agency Inc.; A-Sketch; Horipro; Television Saitama
- Release date: May 10, 2014 (Japan)
- Running time: 109 minutes
- Country: Japan
- Language: Japanese

My Pretend Girlfriend (Japanese: 百瀬、こっちを向いて。, Hepburn: Momose, Kotchi o Muite) is a 2014 Japanese romance film directed by Saiji Yakumo. The theme song is sung by Weaver.

== Cast ==
- Akari Hayami as Momose
- Osamu Mukai as Noburo (Aged 30)
- Tarou Takeuchi as Noboru
- Anna Ishibashi as Tetsuko
- Asuka Kudo as Miyazaki
