= Hiroko Tokita =

Japanese anime screenwriter and director (born 1956)

Hiroko Tokita (ときた ひろこ, born October 24, 1956) is a Japanese anime screenwriter and director.

== Productions worked on ==
- Bonobono: Storyboard, Episode Director
- Chocchan's Story: Director, Screenplay
- Descendants of Darkness: Director, Storyboard (ep. 1)
- Galaxy Angel A: Screenplay (eps. 9B, 11A, 17A)
- Mamotte! Lollipop: Series Composition, Script (ep. 1)
- Master Keaton: Storyboard (ep. 7)
- Miracle Girls: Director (eps. 30–51), Script (ep. 43), Storyboard (ep. 30)
- Mirage of Blaze: Series Composition, Script (eps. 1, 5, 7, 10, 13), Series Formation
- Mizuiro Jidai: Director
- Nazca: Director, Storyboard, Technical Director
- Peach Girl: Series Composition, Screenplay (eps. 1, 6, 11, 17, 20, 23)
- School Rumble: Series Composition, Script (eps. 1, 5, 9, 17, 19, 26)
- School Rumble Nigakki: Series Composition, Script (eps. 1, 5–7, 14, 16, 20, 25–26)
- School Rumble OVA Ichigakki Hoshu: Series Composition, Script (eps. 1–2)
- Sensual Phrase: Series Director
- Suzuka: Series Composition, Script (eps. 1–2, 5, 8, 12, 15, 17, 19–20, 25–26)
- Tenshi Nanka Ja Nai: Director
- Touch: Series Director
- Tsukihime, Lunar Legend: Script (eps. 1–12), Series Story Editor
- Ultra Nyan: Hoshizora Kara Maiorita Fushigi Neko: Director, Storyboard
- Ultra Nyan 2: Happy Daisakusen: Director, Storyboard
- X: Script (eps. 20, 23–24)
- YAWARA! a fashionable judo girl!: Director, Storyboard (eps. 1, 15, 23, 27, 44, 54–55, 75, 90, 124), Episode Director (eps. 1, 15, 23, 27, 44, 54–55, 75, 90, 124)
- Yawara! Soreyuke Koshinuke Kiss!!: Director, Storyboard
