= Akari Hayami =

Japanese actress and model (born 1995)

- 早見 あかり
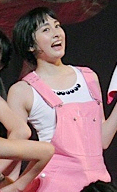
- Hayami in 2011
- Born: March 17, 1995 (age 31); Tokyo, Japan
- Other name: Akarin (nickname)
- Occupations: Actress; model; former idol
- Years active: 2008–present
- Children: 1
- Musical career
- Genre: Pop
- Years active: 2008–2011
- Website: Stardust Profile

Akari Hayami (早見 あかり, Hayami Akari; born March 17, 1995) is a Japanese actress, model and former idol singer. She is known as a former member and subleader of the female musical group Momoiro Clover Z; her Momoiro Clover image color was blue.

== Career ==
Akari Hayami was scouted near her graduation from elementary school and was signed to the agency Stardust Promotion. On November 23, 2008, together with Yukina Kashiwa (presently a member of Nogizaka46) and Ayaka Sasaki she was added to her agency's girl group Momoiro Clover. The group existed since 2008 and its name signified that they were "innocent girls who wanted to spread happiness". At the time, Momoiro Clover performed on the walkways in Yoyogi Park in Shibuya, Tokyo, but with the release of its first indie single in summer of the next year the group quickly rose to fame.

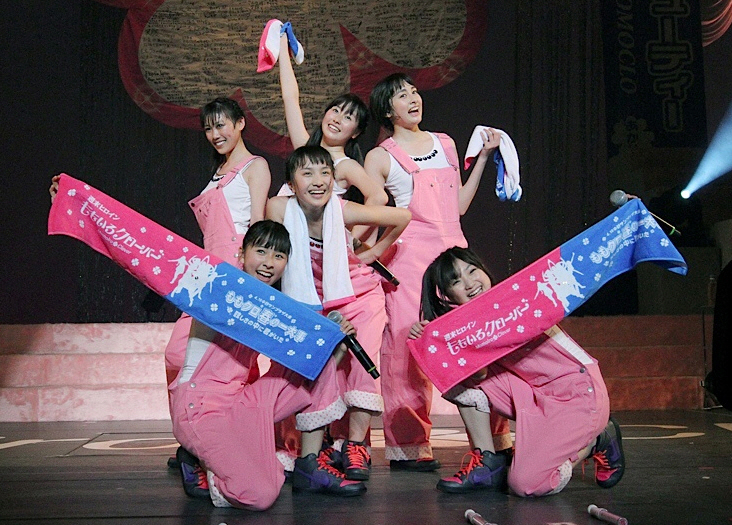
Akari Hayami's final concert with Momoiro Clover. April 10, 2011.

On January 16, 2011, at a launch event for the single "Mirai Bowl", set for release on March 9, Akari announced that she would leave Momoiro Clover in April. The announcement came suddenly to the 500 fans that were present. As for Momoiro Clover leader Kanako Momota, she only learned about it three days prior. Akari explained to the fans: "Ever since I was little, my personality wasn't suited to being an idol. [...] There were times when I was fed up of being in Momoclo." The date of Akari's withdrawal from the group had been already determined, her last concert was to be held on April 10 at Nakano Sun Plaza. As Akari recalled later, one year after leaving Momoiro Clover, she entered entertainment industry with the aim to be an actress and a model. In her days in the group, she struggled with being known as an idol. Rather than "idol Akarin" from Momoiro Clover, she wanted to be "actress and model Akari Hayami". During her final concert with Momoclo, it was announced that the group without Akari would be renamed Momoiro Clover Z. Towards the end of the concert, other members surprised Akari performing a new song called "Akarin e Okuru Uta" (あかりんへ贈る歌; "Farewell Song to Akarin") for her. The song was subsequently released as a limited-issue CD single.

After leaving the group, Akari Hayami was mainly active as a fashion magazine model. She also starred in the Universal Music Japan cheerleading movie Cheerfu11y, which came out on October 22, 2011. In September, after the movie announcement came the news that she would be in a new TV Tokyo sitcom series entitled Urero Mikakunin Shōjo that would start airing on October 7, 2011. The series also features her former Momoiro Clover bandmates.

In November 2012, Momoiro Clover Z was invited to the Kohaku Uta Gassen, an annual New Year's Eve music show on NHK. To qualify for Kohaku had been the girls' dream and common goal as a group also when Akari was in Momoiro Clover. She congratulated her former bandmates in her blog and expressed the desire to appear at Kohaku together with them. In homage to her wish, Momoiro Clover Z performed the song Ikuze! Kaitō Shōjo in Kohaku with the version that included her name on it.

In May 2014, Akari Hayami appeared in her first leading role in a feature film called My Pretend Girlfriend.

== Bibliography ==
- Akari Hayami (March 17, 2015), Akari Hayami Photobook "Twenteen" (in Japanese) (JP Oversized ed.), Tokyo: SDP, ISBN 978-4-906-95322-6

== Filmography ==
=== Film ===
- Shirome (2010)
- Fly! Kobato (飛べ！コバト, Tobe! Kobato) (short, 2010)
- The Citizen Police 69 (市民ポリス69) (2011) — main heroine
- Cheerfu11y (2011)
- Ninifuni (NINIFUNI) (short, February 4, 2012)
- My Pretend Girlfriend (2014) as Momose
- Forget Me Not (忘れないと誓ったぼくがいた) (2015) as Oribe Azusa (main heroine)
- A Loving Husband (恋妻家宮本) (2017) as young Miyoko
- Gintama (2017) as Tetsuko Murata
- Shin Ultraman (2022) as Yumi Funaberi
- Zom 100: Bucket List of the Dead (2023)
- Sana (2023) as Rin
- A Girl Named Ann (2024) as Sara Misumi

=== TV dramas ===
- Here is Greenwood (2008, Tokyo MX)
- Urero Mikakunin Shōjo (ウレロ☆未確認少女; "Unidentified Fantastic Idol") (2011, TV Tokyo)
- Sayonara, Kinoko (さよなら、キノコ; "Goodbye, Mushroom") (2012, TV Asahi)
- Urero Mikansei Shōjo (ウレロ☆未完成少女; "Unfinished Fantastic Idol") (2012, TV Tokyo)
- Nichōme no Hōmuzu (二丁目のホームズ; "Holmes of 2 Chome") (2013, Fuji TV)
- Saito San 2 (斉藤さん2) (2013, Nippon Television Network)
- Subete ga F ni Naru (すべてがFになる) (2014, Fuji TV)
- Ramen Daisuki Koizumi-san (ラーメン大好き小泉さん) (2015, Fuji TV)
- Agein!! (アゲイン!!; "Again!!") (2014, TBS)
- Ramen Daisuki Koizumi-san 2016 Shinshun SP (ラーメン大好き小泉さん2016新春SP) (2016, Fuji TV)

=== TV commercials ===
- Tokyo DisneySea Haru no Campus Day Passport (東京ディズニーシー「春のキャンパスデーパスポート」) (2009)
- Cecile Cupop Fuyu Gō Catalog (セシール「Cupop 09冬号カタログ」) (2009)
- Lion Clinica (LION「クリニカ」, Raion Kurinika) (2012)
- Sony PlayStation Vita Gravity Rush (ソニー・コンピュータエンタテインメント「GRAVITY DAZE」) (2012)
- Granblue Fantasy (グランブルーファンタジー) (2016) (alongside Masaki Suda)

=== Theatre ===
- Urero Mikōkai Shōjo (ウレロ☆未公開少女; "Unbroadcast Fantastic Idol") (2013)

=== Music videos ===
- Little by Little – "Pray" (2008)
- Bourbonz – "Autumn" (2008)
- Bourbonz – "Yukiguni" (2008)
- Bourbonz – "Kizuna" (2009)
- Hyadain – "Hyadain no Jōjō Yūjō" (2011)
- MiChi – "Tokyo Night" (2012)
- Page – "You Topia" (2012)
- CNBlue – "Blind Love" (2013)
- A.F.R.O. – "black" (2013)

=== Dubbing ===
- A Dog's Journey, Clarity June Montgomery (Kathryn Prescott)
- Ultraman: Rising, Ami Wakita (Julia Harriman)
