= I'm No Angel (manga) =

Japanese manga series

- First tankōbon volume cover, featuring Midori Saejima

天使なんかじゃない (Tenshi Nanka ja Nai)
- Genre: Coming-of-age; Romance
- Manga
- Written by: Ai Yazawa
- Published by: Shueisha
- English publisher: NA: Viz Media
- Imprint: Ribon Mascot Comics
- Magazine: Ribon
- Original run: September 1991 – November 1994
- Volumes: 8
- Original video animation
- Directed by: Hiroko Tokita
- Produced by: Masahiro Kon
- Written by: Tomoko Konparu
- Music by: Fujio Takano
- Studio: Group TAC
- Released: September 21, 1994
- Runtime: 30 minutes
- icon

I'm No Angel (Japanese: 天使なんかじゃない, Hepburn: Tenshi Nanka ja Nai) is a Japanese manga series written and illustrated by Ai Yazawa. It was serialized in Shueisha's shōjo manga magazine Ribon from 1991 to 1994, with its chapters collected in eight tankōbon volumes. An original video animation (OVA), animated by Group TAC and directed by Hiroko Tokita, was released in 1994.

== Plot ==
Midori Saejima is a first-year high school student at the newly established Hijiri Gakuen. She is persuaded by her classmates to run for student council, and she becomes eager to apply once she realizes that Akira Sudō, a mysterious boy to whom she is attracted, is also running for student council. Akira and Midori are elected president and vice-president respectively, along with Bunta Kōno, Yūko Mamiya, and Shūichi Takigawa as other officers.

Though Midori and Akira quickly develop a close relationship, Midori learns that he has been romantically attracted to Hiroko Maki, her favorite art teacher, since middle school. Akira reveals that while Hiroko remains an important person in his life, she is already romantically involved with his tutor, Masashi Sakamoto. Akira eventually reciprocates Midori's feelings and they begin dating. However, after Hiroko and Masashi break up, Midori suggests to Akira that they too should break up once she notices he is unable to prioritize her over Hiroko.

After their break-up, Midori begins dating Ken Nakagawa, a musician and friend from middle school, but she realizes she cannot love anyone but Akira and ends their relationship. Before she is able to reconcile with Akira, he suddenly takes a three-month leave of absence from school to search for Masashi abroad. While traveling in France, Akira calls Midori and admits he is in love with her, and the two resolve their relationship. Midori later learns Akira decided to look for Masashi in order to find closure with his complicated feelings towards Hiroko, as well as the fact that he had discovered Masashi is his half-brother.

Once Akira locates Masashi in India, the two return to Japan. Hiroko and Masashi get married and decide to travel abroad, with Hiroko quitting her teaching job. Akira decides to enter a preparatory college to eventually take over his father's company, while the rest of their classmates make plans for after high school graduation. Midori decides to enter a 4-year art college and eventually becomes an art teacher at Hijiri Gakuen.

== Characters ==
Midori Saejima (冴島 翠, Saejima Midori)
Voiced by: Aya Hisakawa
Midori is a happy-go-lucky high school student who is popular among her peers and is seen as an "angel" by them. She falls in love with Akira on her first day of high school and runs for student council, eventually becoming vice president. Yazawa wrote Midori to be a popular girl at school to appeal to her reader demographic. She wrote Midori to be a "kind" and "good girl" comparable to an "angel", but she also aimed to depict her as a "human girl" where she has moments where she is naturally not like that to avoid making her appealing solely to her readers.
Akira Sudō (須藤 晃, Sudō Akira)
Voiced by: Toshiyuki Morikawa
Akira becomes the president if the student council and stands out among the student body with his pompadour hairstyle. After creating a "refreshing" male lead for her previous work, Marine Blue no Kaze ni Dakarete, Yazawa decided to create Akira as the opposite, with him having a "tough" but "kind" personality with a "dark side." Yazawa also wanted to draw a character with a pompadour hairstyle, having been a fan of Eikichi Yazawa and James Dean.
Bunta Kōno (河野 文太, Kōno Bunta)
Voiced by: Toshihiko Seki
The secretary of the student council. His nickname is "Bun" (文ちゃん, Bun-chan). He is from class D.
Yūko Mamiya (麻宮 裕子, Mamiya Yūko)
Voiced by: Akiko Yajima
Mamiya is the secretary of the student council with Bunta Kōno. Midori nicknames her "Mamirin" (まみりん) due to her resemblance to Marilyn Monroe. Yazawa considers Mamiya to be Midori's foil due to their opposite personalities, and despite them clashing, they eventually become friends. She has been in love with Takigawa since middle school.
Shūichi Takigawa (瀧川 秀一, Takigawa Shūichi)
Voiced by: Ryōtarō Okiayu
Takigawa is the treasurer of the student council. He is very popular among the girls in his school because of his good looks and friendly personality. Midori nicknames him "Takigawaman" (タキガワマン) as he reminds her of a superhero.
Shino Harada (原田 志乃, Harada Shino)
She was Shūichi's girlfriend and Mamiya's rival. She is seen as an idol by the boys in Hijiri. She is jealous of Mamiya and doubts about Shūichi's fidelity. This will cause them to break up.
Hiroko Maki (牧 博子, Maki Hiroko)
Voiced by: Kikuko Inoue
Art teacher at Midori's school. She is popular among her students due to her beauty and kind personality. She is in a long-distance relationship with Masashi Sakamoto. Not seeing the love of her life makes her reach her limit but the couple finally gets married in the 4th volume.
Masashi Sakamoto (坂本 将志, Sakamoto Masashi)
Akira's tutor before high school. An avid artist, he leaves Hiroko in Japan and travels around the world (mostly France) for his art. It is revealed in the story that Masashi is Akira's half-brother.
Ken Nakagawa (中川 ケン, Nakagawa Ken)
Midori's friend from junior-high. Ken is a musician who dreams of becoming a star. He first appears in volume 3, when Midori meets up with some of her old friends on her birthday. He is often mentioned in another of Yazawa's works, Neighborhood Story, as the character Tsutomu bears an uncanny resemblance to him. Ken was inspired by a boy who Yazawa saw pass by her on the street.
Tomoko Kawakami (川上 友子, Kawakami Tomoko)
Voiced by: Junko Iwao
A student of class A. Her nickname is "Tonko" (トン子).
Kayo (カヨ)
Voiced by: Mayumi Nomura
A student of class A. She is calm and takes pride in her soft skin.

== Production ==
While conceptualizing the series, manga author Ai Yazawa debated on the story centered on a rockabilly band or a student council. While she settled for a student council at the recommendation of her editor, the band concept would later be reused for Nana in 2000. Yazawa also stated that she was asked by her editor to make her female characters more "attractive" and was also faced with the challenge of creating a story that would draw in Ribon's reader demographic of elementary school girls. After consulting people for suggestions on the main character, Yazawa was given feedback that children project themselves onto the main character, and that if she made the main character a popular girl at school, the target audience might find interest with it. Yazawa then decided to draw a school life story that people would be "entertained" by. The title came from a random phrase Yazawa pieced together that she felt expressed the main character, Midori, which she aimed to depict as a "proper human girl" who, while she was a "kind" and "good girl" that was "like an angel", also naturally had moments where she is "not like that all the time." Chapter 29 shows a cameo appearance of characters from Marine Blue no Kaze ni Dakarete, Yazawa's previous work.

== Media ==
=== Manga ===
Written and illustrated by Ai Yazawa, I'm No Angel was serialized in Shueisha's shōjo manga magazine Ribon from the September 1991 to the November 1994 issues. Shueisha collected its chapters in eight tankōbon volumes, released from May 15, 1992, to March 15, 1995. The series was republished in a four-volume kanzenban edition in 2000, and a six-volume bunkoban edition from 2008 to 2009. A five-volume "reorganized" version was released in 2019.

In October 2025, Viz Media announced that it had licensed the series for English-language publication, publishing the kanzenban reprint of the series. The first volume was released on June 2, 2026.

==== Tankōbon edition ====
No.	Release date	ISBN
1	May 15, 1992	4-08-853610-X
2	September 14, 1992	4-08-853628-2
3	March 15, 1993	4-08-853655-X
4	August 9, 1993	4-08-853680-0
5	January 14, 1994	4-08-853709-2
6	June 15, 1994	4-08-853738-6
7	October 14, 1994	4-08-853758-0
8	March 15, 1995	4-08-853785-8

==== Kanzenban edition ====
No.	Original release date	Original ISBN	English release date	English ISBN
1	October 30, 2000	4-08-782129-3	June 2, 2026	978-1-9747-5785-5
1. "The Student Council Takes Shape"; 2. "Stand by Me"; 3. "The Two Hirokos"; 4. "Welcome, New Students"; Extra: "Behind-the-Scenes Story"
2	October 30, 2000	4-08-782130-7	September 1, 2026	978-1-9747-6525-6
3	December 15, 2000	4-08-782131-5	December 1, 2026	978-1-9747-6555-3
4	December 15, 2000	4-08-782132-3	—	—

=== Original video animation ===
A 30-minute original video animation (OVA) was released on September 21, 1994. It was animated by Group TAC and directed by Hiroko Tokita, with script by Tomoko Konparu, character designs by Yasuomi Umetsu, and music composed by Fujio Takano.

== Reception ==
By June 2019, the manga had over 10 million copies in circulation. The series ranked fifth in a survey conducted by Oricon on the top ten shōjo manga series.
