= Yōko Kawanami =

Japanese voice actress (1957–2025)

- 川浪 葉子
- Born: April 22, 1957; Motomachi, Naka-ku, Yokohama City, Kanagawa Prefecture, Japan
- Died: March 18, 2025 (aged 67)
- Occupation: Voice actress
- Years active: 1970–2025
- Agent: Aoni Production
- Notable work: Dragon Ball Z as Bulma's mother
- Website: Official profile

Yōko Kawanami (川浪 葉子, Kawanami Yōko; April 22, 1957 – March 18, 2025) was a Japanese voice actress affiliated with Aoni Production.

== Biography ==
Born on April 22, 1957, Kawanami grew up in Motomachi, Naka-ku, Yokohama City, Kanagawa Prefecture.

She graduated from Yokohama Municipal Minami-Yoshida Elementary School and Yokohama Kyoritsu Gakuen Junior and Senior High School, the second mission school in Japan, where she became a gentle, well-mannered woman. As an only daughter, she was shy and introverted.

Kawanami, an only child of a dentist, initially pursued dentistry in high school but decided to become a voice actor and enroll at the Toho Gakuen, motivated by her love of foreign films. After discussions, her parents supported her choice, and as of 1982, she expressed gratitude for their understanding.

Near graduation, she recognized that attending vocational school alone wouldn’t suffice to become a voice actor and lacked direction. To avoid disappointing her parents, she enrolled at Theatre Echo Training Institute, improved her acting skills, and was selected as co-host for the radio program "A Thousand and One Nights" with Yasuo Yamada.

Afterwards, following a new project, Kawanami joined Aoni Production, where was she affiliated with until her death. She made her voice acting debut in Captain Caveman and the Teen Angels.

=== Death ===
Kawanami died from cancer on March 18, 2025, at the age of 67. Her death was announced a week later on March 27 by Aoni. Eiko Yamada, Jun'ichi Kanemaru, Megumi Ogata, Mika Kanai, Naoko Matsui, Ryōtarō Okiayu, Toshio Furukawa, Yū Mizushima, her agency Aoni, and TMS Entertainment paid respects and gave condolences the day following the announcement on Twitter.

== Filmography ==
=== Television animation ===
List of voice performances in television animation
| Year | Title | Role | Notes | Source |
|---|---|---|---|---|
| 1979 | Mobile Suit Gundam | Loran | | |
| 1979 | Lupin the 3rd Part II | Margaret | Ep. 86 | |
| 1980 | Ganbare Gonbe | Monko | | |
| 1980 | The Rose of Versailles | A Woman of the City | | |
| 1981 | GoShogun | Arusha | | |
| 1981 | Fang of the Sun Dougram | Rita Berrett | | |
| 1981 | The New Adventures of Gigantor | Additional voice | Debuts in Ep. 17 | |
| 1981 | Hello! Sandybell | Alice | | |
| 1981 | Dotakon | Yumi Dan, Misato Saijo, Jenny Yamauchi, Soyoka Harukaze | | |
| 1981 | God Mars | Mika Hyuga | | |
| 1982 | Little Pollon | Aphrodite | | |
| 1982 | The Monster Kid | Mako | | |
| 1982 | Thunderbirds 2086 | Jenny, Gran's daughter | | |
| 1982 | Robby the Rascal | Kurumi Yukino, Matomo | | |
| 1982 | Dr. Slump - Arale-chan | Beautiful Woman, Lulu | Beautiful Woman in Ep. 48, Lulu in Ep. 103 | |
| 1982 | Call of the Wild | Additional voice | | |
| 1983 | Love Me, My Knight | Marino | Eps. 26–29 | |
| 1983 | Galactic Whirlwind Sasuraiger | Gina, Woman A | | |
| 1983 | Armored Trooper VOTOMS | Coconna | | |
| 1983 | Ninja Hattori-kun | Aiko-sensei | | |
| 1984 | Sōya Monogatari | Fudako, Wife, Yukiko | | |
| 1984 | Video Warrior Laserion | Monro | | |
| 1984 | Wing-Man | Aoi Yume | | |
| 1985 | GeGeGe no Kitarō | Yūko Tendō, Shinichi's Mom, Announcer, Female Teacher, Shigekusa Nagayo, Omu's Mother, Lantern Bearer | | |
| 1986 | Dragon Ball | Ranfan | | |
| 1986 | Wonder Beat Scramble | Ritsuko Sugita | | |
| 1987 | City Hunter | Syo, Yōko Makino | Syo in Ep. 4, Yōko Makino in Ep. 9 | |
| 1987 | Tsuide ni Tonchinkan | Kyōko Yoshizawa | | |
| 1987 | Transformers: The Headmasters | Arcee | | |
| 1987 | Mister Ajikko | Mitsuko Yamaoka | | |
| 1988 | Topo Gigio | Daina, Miss Gloria, Miss Warren, Customer, Mrs. Russell, Aunt, Girl, Aria, Boss, Pepe, Mouse A, Teacher, Stefano, Shop Clerk B, Sofia Monte | | |
| 1988 | The Secret of Akko-chan | Vivid, Yamaguchi's mother, Kenta's mother | | |
| 1989 | Kariage-kun | Kayoko, Beautiful Woman | First voice of Kayoko | |
| 1989 | Let's Go! Anpanman | Princess Bazuru, Kinoko-chan, Nenko-chan, Sarako-chan | First voice of Kinoko-chan and Sarako-chan | |
| 1989 | Dragon Quest | Martina | | |
| 1989 | Sally the Witch 2 | Siam | | |
| 1990 | Madö King Granzört | The Ice Queen | | |
| 1992 | Super Bikkuriman | Upper Palace | | |
| 1992 | Dragon Ball Z | Bulma's mother, Cynthia | Second voice of Bulma's mother | |
| 1992 | Sailor Moon | Countess Rose/Shakoukai | Ep. 37 | |
| 1992 | My Patrasche | Anna | | |
| 1992 | Mikan Enikki | Molly | | |
| 1992 | Yadamon | Queen | | |
| 1993 | Ghost Sweeper Mikami | Medusa | | |
| 1994 | Crayon Shin-chan | Mrs. Ujuin | Debuted in Ep. 133a | |
| 1994 | Sailor Moon S | U Ikasaman | Ep. 118 | |
| 1994 | Marmalade Boy | Rumi Koishikawa | | |
| 1995 | World Fairy Tale Series | Fairy | | |
| 1995 | Neighborhood Story | Ruriko Kōda | Main role | |
| 1996 | The Legend of Zorro | Leona's mother | | |
| 1996 | GeGeGe no Kitarō | The Blowing-Out Old Woman | | |
| 1996 | Sailor Moon SuperS | Mayako | Ep. 142 | |
| 2006 | Atashin'chi | TV Voice, TV Voice A, Mrs. Ijuin | | |
| 2006 | Demashita! Powerpuff Girls Z | Miss Sara Bellum, Primitive Man Who Looks Like Miss Bellum | Primitive Man Who Looks Like Miss Bellum in Ep. 51 | |
| 2007 | Great Detective Conan | Hiroko Inoue, Mari Izunami | | |
| 2007 | One Piece | Abi's mother | | |
| 2008 | GeGeGe no Kitarō | Kyūketsuki, Monroe | Kyūketsuki in Ep. 94, Monroe in Eps. 43 and 54 | |
| 2008 | Hakaba Kitarō | Gama-Reijō | Ep. 7 | |
| 2009 | Element Hunters | Naomi Filina | | |
| 2009 | Dragon Ball Z Kai | Bulma's mother | | |
