= Osamu Mukai =

Japanese actor (born 1982)

- 向井 理
- Born: 7 February 1982 (age 44); Kanagawa Prefecture, Japan
- Occupation: Actor
- Years active: 2006–present
- Agent: Hori Agency
- Known for: GeGeGe no Nyōbō; Beck
- Spouse: Ryoko Kuninaka (m. 2014)
- Children: 2

Osamu Mukai (向井 理, Mukai Osamu; born February 7, 1982) is a Japanese actor. He was born in Kanagawa Prefecture, Japan. He graduated from Meiji University.

== Early life ==
He was born in Isogo-ku, Yokohama, Kanagawa prefecture and went to Hama Junior high school (浜中学校) and Hitorizawa High school, where it became the location for After the Rain. He graduated from Meiji University, and majored in genetic engineering. He received the "Best Poster Award" at the International Zoological Genetics Conference in 2004. While he was attending university, he worked as a bartender. He became a full-time employee there after graduation, and he became a manager later. While working as a bartender, he got into the magazine Tokyo Graffiti. A reader later recruited him to be an actor. Now, he works for Hori agency, as an actor.

== Filmography ==
=== Television ===
Year	Title	Role	Notes	Ref.
2006	Journey Under the Midnight Sun			
2010	My Husband Is a Cartoonist	Murai Shigeru	Asadora	
2010	Shinzanmono	Kyose Koki		
2010	Hotaru no Hikari 2	Seno Kazuma		
2011	Gō	Tokugawa Hidetada	Taiga drama	
2012	Summer Rescue: Hospital of Sky	Keigo Hayami	Lead role	
2014	S: The Last Policeman	Kamikura Ichigo	Lead role	
2014	Nobunaga Concerto	Ikeda Tsuneoki		
2016	Daddy Sister	Tetsurō Kohashi	Asadora	
2017	Akira and Akira	Akira Kaidō	Lead role	
2020	Awaiting Kirin	Ashikaga Yoshiteru	Taiga drama	
2021	The Grand Family	Teppei Manpyō		
2022	Bakumatsu Aibō-den	Hijikata Toshizō	Lead role; television film	
2022	First Love			
2023	Ya Boy Kongming!	Zhuge Kongming	Lead role	
2023	Angel Flight	Yukito Adachi		
2024	The Great Passage	Masashi Nishioka		
2024	Light of My Lion	Shogo Tachibana		

=== Films ===
Year	Title	Role	Notes	Ref.
2007	I'll Die For You			
2010	Hanamizuki	Junichi Kitami		
2010	Beck	Yoshiyuki Taira		
2011	Paradise Kiss	Joji "George" Koizumi		
2012	SPEC: Ten	Sekai		
2012	We Can't Change the World. But, We Wanna Build a School in Cambodia.	Tanaka Kota	Lead role	
2014	My Pretend Girlfriend	Noburo (Aged 30)		
2014	Her Granddaughter	Toshio Nakagawa		
2015	S The Last Policeman - Recovery of Our Future	Ichigo Kamikura	Lead role	
2016	Nobunaga Concerto	Ikeda Tsuneoki		
2017	When Will You Return?	Gorō Ashimura		
2019	The Fable	Sunagawa		
2021	Brothers in Brothel	Mita		
2022	Wedding High	Noriaki Sawada		
2023	Ichikei's Crow: The Movie	Eiji Ujō		
2025	Ya Boy Kongming! The Movie	Zhuge Kongming	Lead role	
2026	Angel Flight: The Movie	Yukito Adachi		

== Awards and nominations ==
Year	Award	Category	Work(s)	Result	Ref.
2010	GQ Japan Men of the Year		Himself	Won	
2011	35th Elan d'or Awards	Best New Actor	Himself	Won	
2011	32nd Yokohama Film Festival	Best Newcomer	Beck and Hanamizuki	Won	
2011	TVnavi Drama of the Year 2010	Best Supporting Actor	GeGeGe no Nyōbō	Won	
2011	19th Hashida Awards	Best Newcomer	GeGeGe no Nyōbō	Won	
