= Ai Yazawa =

Japanese manga author

- 矢沢 あい
- Born: March 7, 1967 (age 59); Amagasaki, Hyōgo, Japan
- Occupation: Manga artist
- Writing career
- Years active: 1985–present
- Notable works: I'm No Angel, Neighborhood Story, Paradise Kiss, Nana

Ai Yazawa (矢沢 あい, Yazawa Ai; born March 7, 1967) is a Japanese manga artist and illustrator. Yazawa debuted as a manga artist with her short story Ano Natsu (1985). She gained mainstream popularity in the 1990s and 2000s with her series I'm No Angel (1991), Neighborhood Story (1995), Paradise Kiss (1999), and Nana (2000), the latter being one of the best-selling manga series. Since June 2009, Yazawa has been focusing on illustration projects due to health concerns.

== Early life ==
Yazawa started reading manga magazines when she was 10 years old, and when she was 12 years old, she attempted to draw manga and submitted it to Ribon Manga School, making it into the lowest class. Yazawa began training and submitting her works seriously around age 15, eventually making it into a higher class. As a student, she was a fan of Eikichi Yazawa, whose surname she adopted for her pseudonym.

At the time of her manga debut, Yazawa was 17 years old and in her final year of high school. Unsure of whether she would be able to make a living off of being a manga artist, Yazawa wound up attending Osaka Mode Gakuen to become a stylist. However, once Ribon decided to serialize her works, Yazawa dropped out of school to focus on drawing manga, a decision she describes as "disappointing" and "painful" at the time.

== Career ==
=== 1985–1991: Debut and early works ===
With the help of an editor, Yazawa debuted as a manga artist on her 10th submission to Ribon in 1985 with the short story Ano Natsu.

=== 1991–2009: Mainstream breakthrough ===
From 1991 to 1995, Yazawa published I'm No Angel in Ribon, which became her breakthrough series. Following I'm No Angel, Yazawa went onto publish Neighborhood Story. After the end of Neighborhood Story, Yazawa created Last Quarter.

Yazawa was later requested to draw two short stories to accompany the launch of Cookie. This led to the creation of Nana, as she decided to make the two stories related to each other so that they would be easier to read if they were later picked up for serialization. In 2003, Yazawa was awarded the Shogakukan Manga Award for Nana. Yazawa illustrated the cover of Rumi Shishido's 2003 album Rumi Roll, who she had been friends with since Shishido was cast as Mikako in the anime adaptation of Neighborhood Story.

In June 2009, Yazawa became hospitalized after contracting an illness, putting Nana on indefinite hiatus. She returned from the hospital in April 2010. In 2022, Yazawa stated she was still recovering from her illness and expressed interest in continuing Nana in the future.

=== 2009–present: Nana hiatus and illustration work ===
Yazawa has focused on illustration work since putting Nana on hold. She provided artwork for singer Juju's single "Iiwake" in 2017 and a celebratory illustration for Space Channel 5 VR: Kinda Funky News Flash in 2020, drew a mini-manga featuring characters from I'm No Angel and Neighborhood Story in 2016, contributed new images to the 2015 Nana calendar, and published a new "Junko's Room" chapter, her first new manga in over three years, in 2013.

From July 20, 2022, to August 8, 2022, Yazawa held an art exhibit titled "All Time Best", featuring original manga manuscripts and illustrations for I'm No Angel and her other series.

On January 31, 2024, Yazawa illustrated a promotional visual as part of a collaboration with fashion brand Lulu Felice, who created wedding dresses based on Nana and Neighborhood Story.

== Personal life ==
Yazawa became hospitalized in June 2009 for an unspecified illness, which caused her to put Nana on hiatus. She was discharged in April 2010.

== Artistry and themes ==
Yazawa cites manga artists Fuyumi Ogura and Ryo Ikuemi as her inspirations, as well as music from the singers Miyuki Nakajima and Yumi Matsutoya. In 2008, Japanese Visual Culture: Explorations in the World of Manga and Anime compared her to manga artist Taku Tsumugi for her play with depth and layering. Animefringe columnist Steve Diabo noted that Yazawa's works feature her "bizarre" sense of humor, with Yazawa often making cameos in her own works.

While Yazawa initially started drawing manga using dip pens and brushes, after the conclusion of Neighborhood Story in 1996, she began using drawing pens, oil pastels and markers. However, Yazawa also stated that she would return to use dip pens and brushes for Last Quarter as the tools helped her convey the mood of the series. For color manuscripts, Yazawa used color ink until working on Marine Blue no Kaze ni Dakarete, and after I'm No Angel, Yazawa began using digital tools. Currently, she uses an iPad and MacBook to illustrate.

Yazawa's work has been highlighted for its focus on Japanese alternative fashion; from 1998 to 1999, fashion magazine Kera ran features on Mikako Komatsu, the main character of Neighborhood Story, and produced sewing patterns based on Happy Berry, a fictional fashion brand by the character. In addition, Yazawa prominently features Vivienne Westwood in Nana, and some clothing featured in the show are based on clothing from her own personal collection. In 2024, through a survey of 100 people by TV Maga (a web magazine operated by TV Log), Nana was voted no. 1 for most fashionable manga, along with Yazawa's other works Paradise Kiss and Neighborhood Story following at no. 2.

== Works ==
=== Series ===
Year	Title	Magazine	Notes
1986	Love Letter; Rabu Retā (ラブレター)	Ribon	
1988	Ballad Made Soba ni Ite; Barādo Made Soba ni Ite (バラードまでそばにいて)	Ribon	
1989	Marine Blue no Kaze ni Dakarete; Marin Burū no Kaze ni Dakarete (マリンブルーの風に抱かれて)	Ribon	
1991	I'm No Angel (天使なんかじゃない, Tenshi Nanka ja Nai)	Ribon	
1995	Neighborhood Story; Gokinjo Monogatari (ご近所物語)	Ribon	
1998	Last Quarter; Kagen no Tsuki (下弦の月)	Ribon	
1999	Paradise Kiss	Zipper	
2000	Nana	Cookie	

=== Short stories ===
- Ano Natsu (1985)
- 15-nenme (1986)
- Kaze ni Nare! (1988)
- Escape (1988)
- Usubeni no Arashi (1992)

=== Character design ===
- Princess Ai (2004–2005) – 3 volumes
