= Neighborhood Story =

Japanese manga series and its adaptations

- First tankōbon volume cover, featuring Mikako Kouda

ご近所物語 (Gokinjo Monogatari)
- Genre: Coming-of-age; Romance; Slice of life
- Manga
- Written by: Ai Yazawa
- Published by: Shueisha
- English publisher: NA: Viz Media
- Imprint: Ribon Mascot Comics
- Magazine: Ribon
- Original run: February 1995 – October 1997
- Volumes: 7
- Anime television series
- Directed by: Atsutoshi Umezawa
- Produced by: Kōichirō Fujita (ABC); Yasuo Kameyama (Asatsu); Takashi Horiuchi (Asatsu); Hiromi Seki
- Written by: Aya Matsui
- Music by: Masahiro Kawasaki
- Studio: Toei Animation
- Original network: ANN (ABC, TV Asahi)
- Original run: September 10, 1995 – September 1, 1996
- Episodes: 50
- Anime film
- Directed by: Junji Shimizu
- Produced by: Tan Takaiwa; Tomio Anzai; Tsutomu Tomari
- Written by: Yumi Kageyama
- Music by: Masahiro Kawasaki
- Studio: Toei Animation
- Released: March 2, 1996
- Runtime: 30 minutes
- icon

Neighborhood Story (Japanese: ご近所物語, Hepburn: Gokinjo Monogatari) is a Japanese manga series written and illustrated by Ai Yazawa. It was serialized by Shueisha's shōjo manga magazine Ribon from 1995 to 1997, with its chapters collected in seven tankōbon volumes. The manga has been licensed for English release in North America by Viz Media.

A 50-episode anime television series adaptation, produced by Toei Animation, was broadcast on ABC, TV Asahi and other stations from September 1995 to September 1996. An anime film was released in March 1996.

== Story ==
Mikako Kōda is an aspiring fashion designer who attends Yazawa Art Academy in Tokyo and is slowly building up her clothing brand, Happy Berry. Having been childhood friends with her neighbor, Tsutomu Yamaguchi, Mikako reassesses her once-platonic feelings for him when he suddenly becomes popular at school due to his resemblance to the singer Ken Nakagawa and begins dating Mariko, a popular and attractive girl.

== Characters ==
=== Main characters ===
Mikako Koda (幸田 実果子, Kōda Mikako)
Voiced by: Rumi Shishido
Mikako is driven by her dream of becoming a fashion designer and having all the stores sell her handiwork under the brand name "Happy Berry". Mikako is at her most conspicuous when she is inspired or in a stormy mood for one reason or another. The former earns her the admiration of her classmates while the latter incenses her teacher Ms. Hamada who thinks nothing of keeping her after school to revise her clumsy handiwork. Mikako has a ferocious rivalry with Mariko who she fears will wield Tsutomu to his detriment along with unrealistic expectations of Tsutomu that leads to a very vivacious and adversarial discourse that often inflames matters on many occasions.
Tsutomu Yamaguchi (山口 ツトム, Yamaguchi Tsutomu)
Voiced by: Kappei Yamaguchi
Unlike his fiery friend and next-door neighbor Mikako, Tsutomu is somewhat equivocal in regards what he wishes to do with his life as he synthesizes abstract art from odds and ends that he has found here and there but not his feelings about Mikako as his prologue is rife with instances where he has interceded on her behalf or otherwise come to her rescue. Tsutomu follows Mikako's lead in forming the street market club Akindo while seeming to operate according to the proverb "Keep moving forward by doing your best in the moment." Unfortunately, as much of a chivalrous knight as he has been that has long embraced being in love with Mikako, Tsutomu is not perfect. Tsutomu's eerie corporeal similarity to the Manbou lead singer Ken Nakagawa from I'm No Angel has caused several fangirls mistaking him for the musician and fanatically accosting him for an autograph, being given a love letter, or being chased around all over the place. In addition to being frightened of Mikako forcing him to forego the world and the rest of his life, Tsutomu also has a very accommodating »aim to please« personality that affords easy coercion/manipulation (or in Mariko's case, seduction). Tsutomu's chaotic conduct often frustrates Mikako into prosecuting a fierce adversarial divergent concourse that has led to several impulsive comments about which neither adolescent is really sincere.

=== Akindo members ===
Risa Kanzaki (神崎 リサ, Kanzaki Risa)
Voiced by: Shiho Niiyama
Mikako's best female friend, Risa comes from Hokkaido and her dream is to design children's clothes. She lives with her boyfriend Takeshi, a guitarist for a local band, and is Mikako's biggest supporter as well as (later in the series) the mother of Arashi whose best friend is George from Paradise Kiss.
Mai Oota (太田 麻衣, Ōta Mai)
Voiced by: Wakana Yamazaki
Also known as P, she is a friend of Mikako and Risa's. Mai wears Lolita-style clothing and always carries her stuffed animal Pucci Francois with her. She makes stuffed animals to sell at Akindo and falls for Seiji.
Jiro Nishino (西野 ジロー, Nishino Jirō)
Voiced by: Kyousei Tsukui
Has purple hair and always wears sunglasses, though Mikako gets to see his eyes during the last volume of the manga. He is close friends with Tsutomu and Yuusuke and is a computer programmer that creates various computer games.
Yuusuke Tashiro (田代 勇介, Tashiro Yūsuke)
Voiced by: Toshiyuki Morikawa
Tsutomu's best friend, Yuusuke studies painting at Yazawa (although half-heartedly) and has feelings for Mariko. He is very gruff, but has a good heart and rides a motorcycle.

=== Kouda family ===
Miwako Sakurada (櫻田 実和子, Sakurada Miwako)
Miwako is spawned as a result of her parents finally seeing the light in regards to their childish conduct and how it adversely affects Mikako. Miwako does not get to begin her postnatal life until Paradise Kiss, whose inception is several years after Neighborhood Story.
Ruriko Kouda (幸田 留里子, Kōda Ruriko)
Voiced by: Yōko Kawanami
Although she is Mikako's mother, Ruriko often acts more like a co-dependent elder sister than a mother whose irresponsibility forces Mikako to maintain their home life by herself. Ruriko is often seen sleeping the morning away after all-night deadline crunches due to her job as a shoujo manga author.
Hirohiko Sakurada (櫻田 広彦, Sakurada Hirohiko)
Voiced by: Yusaku Yara
Considering the conduct he demonstrates with his daughter and the sometimes erratic hours photographers like him are required to keep, Hirohiko's divorce from Ruriko when Mikako was young was probably caused by both Hirohiko and Ruriko growing apart because they failed to do the work necessary to maintain their marriage. Fortunately, Hirohiko comes back onto the scene and does the work alongside Ruriko necessary for the two eventually reconcile and remarry. Hirohiko is also a crucial force for Tsutomu deciding what to do with his life.

=== Nakasu family ===
Mariko Nakasu (中須 茉莉子, Nakasu Mariko)
Voiced by: Yumi Tōma
Nicknamed “Body Ko” for her usual, sultry appearance. She is popular at school and has had many boyfriends, but admits she is tired of dating men who only want her for sex. She is in love with her childhood friend from Yokohama, Shuuichi. After going out with Tsutomu for a short amount of time, she begin a volatile relationship with Yuusuke which lasts for almost the whole length of the series.
She later marries her Shuuichi, and has a son.
Shintarou Nakasu (中須 新太郎, Nakasu Shintarō)
Voiced by: Chizu Yonemoto
Body Ko's little brother, he sculpts dolls and sports dreadlocks (much to Mariko's chagrin). He studies ceramics and gives his sister advice, though she does not want to hear it most of the time.

=== Other characters ===
Hamada (浜田)
Voiced by: Junko Hagimori
Ms. Hamada is the strict teacher of the fashion design and sewing lab classes at Yazawa that has no qualms about detaining a student after school for inattentive or clumsy handiwork -- a trap that Mikako often instigates when she is upset for one reason or another. Strangely enough, Mikako is not sent packing by Ms. Hamada's abrasive personality or having her handiwork harshly appraised and even goes so far as to identify clumsy textile handiwork that would instigate an after-school detention at Ms. Hamada's hands. She was also the professor for Seiji and the cast of Paradise Kiss.
Noriji Sunami (陶波 法司, Sunami Noriji)
Voiced by: Takeshi Aono
Noriji is the old-fashioned but well-intentioned manager of the apartment complex where Mikako and Tsutomu live. It is his good-natured teasing that inspires the epiphany as to the metamorphosis in their mutual feelings that Mikako and Tsutomu undergo throughout the series. Noriji also has a bit of a crush on Ruriko and demonstrates an almost paternal concern when Mikako's status is unknown.
Ayumi Oikawa (及川 歩, Oikawa Ayumi)
Voiced by: Yūko Minaguchi
Tsutomu's classmate who owns the shed where the group creates Akindo's headquarters and she creates large, abstract 3-D sculptures. She likes Yuusuke and admires his paintings, but she is jealous of his relationship with Mariko. She later marries Yuusuke (which then makes her Ayumi Toshiro), and she is last seen pregnant with his child.
Hiroaki Tokumori (徳森 浩昭, Tokumori Hiroaki)
Voiced by: Hideyuki Tanaka
Owns a bar which is frequented by the characters who live in Mikako's apartment complex. Father of (later in the series) Hiroyuki Tokumori from Paradise Kiss. Initially considered an 'older-brother' type figure to Miwako, his role is late replaced by Seiji.
Seiji Kisaragi (如月 星次, Kisaragi Seiji)
A “sparkling foreigner” who applies for the job of manga assistant for Mikako's mother. He is saving up money to study abroad. He used to go to Yazawa for fashion, but dropped out when he realized that his passion was in hairstyling. He becomes a close friend of Mikako's and appears in Paradise Kiss.
Shuuji Araya (新谷 修司, Araya Shūji)
Mariko's childhood friend from Yokohama. He has a girlfriend when first introduced. He later breaks up with her, and the series ends with Mariko and him married, with a son.

== Media ==
=== Manga ===
Written and illustrated by Ai Yazawa, Neighborhood Story was serialized in Shueisha's shōjo manga magazine Ribon from the February 1995 to the October 1997 issues. Shueisha collected its chapters in seven tankōbon volumes, released from October 13, 1995, to April 15, 1998. The covers of all volumes created a panoramic picture of the characters eating at a picnic when put together side-by-side.

The series was republished in a four-volume aizōban edition in 2005, and a five-volume bunkoban edition in 2011.

In North America, the manga has been licensed for English release by Viz Media. The first volume was released on December 5, 2023. The fourth and final volume was released on December 2, 2024.

=== Anime ===
A 50-episode anime television series adaptation, produced by Toei Animation, Asahi Broadcasting Corporation and Asatsu-DK, was broadcast on TV Asahi from September 10, 1995, to September 1, 1996. It was directed by Atsutoshi Umezawa, with Aya Matsui handling series composition, Yoshihiko Umakoshi designing the characters and Masahiro Kawasaki composing the music. The anime stars Rumi Shishido as Mikako, who was encouraged to audition for the part after producer Hiromi Seki heard her speaking voice in her 1990 album, Do-Re-Mi-Fa-So-La-Ti-Do-Shi-Shi-Do-Ru-Mi. The opening theme is "He.Ro.I.Ne", the first ending theme is "Don't You Know?!" and the second ending theme is "NG!", all sung by Shishido. A DVD box set containing all episodes was released on September 28, 2005.

A 30-minute anime film premiered on March 2, 1996. It is an alternate retelling of the beginning of the series.

==== Episodes ====
No.	Title	Directed by	Written by	Original release date
1	"I Can't Stop Thinking of Him!"; Transliteration: "Ki ni naru aitsu!" (Japanese: 気になるアイツ！)	Atsutoshi Umezawa	Aya Matsui	September 10, 1995
2	"Just a Childhood Friend!"; Transliteration: "Osananajimi tte yatsu!" (Japanese: 幼なじみってやつ！)	Tōru Yamada	Aya Matsui	September 17, 1995
3	"A Nice Body-ko!"; Transliteration: "Naisu na badi-ko!!" (Japanese: ナイスなバディ子!!)	Yoshihiro Oka	Yumi Kageyama	September 24, 1995
4	"The One In Love Has Already Lost!"; Transliteration: "Hamatta hō no make!" (Japanese: ハマった方の負け！)	Akinori Yabe	Yumi Kageyama	October 1, 1995
5	"The Flaming-Hot Blonde Girl!"; Transliteration: "Moeru patsukin onna!" (Japanese: 燃えるパツキン女！)	Yasuo Yamayoshi	Genki Yoshimura	October 8, 1995
6	"Let's Make A Circle!"; Transliteration: "Sākuru shiyō ze!" (Japanese: サークルしようぜ！)	Ryō Tachiba	Aya Matsui	October 15, 1995
7	"Tsutomu or Akindo?"; Transliteration: "Tsutomu ka Akindo ka" (Japanese: ツトムかアキンドか)	Tōru Yamada	Aya Matsui	October 22, 1995
8	"Flea Market!"; Transliteration: "Furī māketto!" (Japanese: フリーマーケット！)	Atsutoshi Umezawa	Aya Matsui	October 29, 1995
9	"The Lover of My Sinful Mama!"; Transliteration: "Tsumibukaki mama no koibito!" (Japanese: 罪深きママの恋人！)	Yoshihiro Oka	Yumi Kageyama	November 12, 1995
10	"Love Expectation Relay"; Transliteration: "Koi no omowaku rirē" (Japanese: 恋のおもわくリレー)	Hiroshi Shidara	Yumi Kageyama	November 19, 1995
11	"For Real? A Double date?" Transliteration: "W dēto tte maji?" (Japanese: Ｗデートって本気(マジ)？)	Akinori Yabe	Genki Yoshimura	November 26, 1995
12	"Tsutomu's Been Dumped!"; Transliteration: "Furareta Tsutomu!" (Japanese: フラレたツトム！)	Ryō Tachiba	Yumi Kageyama	December 3, 1995
13	"Motorbike Misunderstanding"; Transliteration: "Baiku ni kansuru gokai" (Japanese: バイクに関する誤解)	Yasuo Yamayoshi	Genki Yoshimura	December 10, 1995
14	"Pii's Panic"; Transliteration: "Pii-chan panikku" (Japanese: ピイちゃんパニック)	Tōru Yamada	Yumi Kageyama	December 17, 1995
15	"A Present to Santa"; Transliteration: "Santa e no okurimono" (Japanese: サンタへの贈りもの)	Yoshihiro Oka	Aya Matsui	December 24, 1995
16	"A Love Prayer! Happy New Year"; Transliteration: "Ren'ai kigan! Hatsumōde" (Japanese: 恋愛祈願！初もうで)	Atsutoshi Umezawa	Genki Yoshimura	January 7, 1996
17	"Body-ko and Shintarou!!"; Transliteration: "Badi-ko to Shintarō" (Japanese: バディ子と新太郎!!)	Akinori Yabe	Yumi Kageyama	January 14, 1996
18	"Friendship? Or Romance?"; Transliteration: "Yūjō ka? Ren'ai ka?" (Japanese: 友情か？恋愛か？)	Yasuo Yamayoshi	Yumi Kageyama	January 21, 1996
19	"Revealed! Risa's Boyfriend!"; Transliteration: "Hakkaku!! Risa no kareshi!" (Japanese: 発覚!! リサの彼氏！)	Ryō Tachiba	Aya Matsui	January 28, 1996
20	"Lessons in Love At The Flea Market"; Transliteration: "Furima de koi no obenkyō" (Japanese: フリマで恋のお勉強)	Tōru Yamada	Aya Matsui	February 4, 1996
21	"If I'm Honest..."; Transliteration: "Sunao ni naretara..." (Japanese: 素直になれたら…)	Yoshihiro Oka	Genki Yoshimura	February 11, 1996
22	"Who's Oikawa Ayumi?!"; Transliteration: "Oikawa Ayumi tte nanimono?!" (Japanese: 及川歩って何者?!)	Atsutoshi Umezawa	Genki Yoshimura	February 18, 1996
23	"The Alighting Angel!"; Transliteration: "Maiorita tenshi!" (Japanese: 舞い降りた天使！)	Akinori Yabe	Genki Yoshimura	February 25, 1996
24	"All Grown Up"; Transliteration: "Otona ni natchatta" (Japanese: 大人になっちゃった)	Hiroshi Shidara	Yumi Kageyama	March 3, 1996
25	"Delusions of the Duo"; Transliteration: "Futari ni kansuru mōsō" (Japanese: 二人に関する妄想)	Ryō Tachiba	Genki Yoshimura	March 10, 1996
26	"Fired Up At The Hot Springs!"; Transliteration: "Onsen de meramera!" (Japanese: 温泉でメラメラ！)	Yasuo Yamayoshi	Yumi Kageyama	March 17, 1996
27	"Body-ko's Gripe"; Transliteration: "Badi-ko no iraira" (Japanese: バディ子のイライラ)	Tōru Yamada	Yumi Kageyama	March 24, 1996
28	"Why So Sullen?"; Transliteration: "Fukigen no riyū wa?" (Japanese: フキゲンの理由は？)	Atsutoshi Umezawa	Yumi Kageyama	March 31, 1996
29	"Flea Market Again!"; Transliteration: "Furima agein!" (Japanese: フリマ・アゲイン！)	Yoshihiro Oka	Yumi Kageyama	April 7, 1996
30	"Step-By-Step With Dreams and Romance!"; Transliteration: "Koi mo yume mo ippozutsu!" (Japanese: 恋も夢も一歩ずつ！)	Akinori Yabe	Yumi Kageyama	April 14, 1996
31	"Omigosh! Teacher Again..."; Transliteration: "Doki! Shishō futatabi..." (Japanese: ドキッ！師匠再び…)	Ryō Tachiba	Genki Yoshimura	April 21, 1996
32	"Robots Entwining The Hearts"; Transliteration: "Kokoro o tsunagu robotto" (Japanese: 心をつなぐロボット)	Yasuo Yamayoshi	Genki Yoshimura	April 28, 1996
33	"The Guy Who Fell For The Vapid Girl"; Transliteration: "Karui onna ni horeta yatsu" (Japanese: 軽い女に惚れたヤツ)	Atsutoshi Umezawa	Aya Matsui	May 5, 1996
34	"A Night With An Angel... Risa!"; Transliteration: "Ichiya no tenshi... Risa!" (Japanese: 一夜の天使…リサ！)	Yoshihiro Oka	Yumi Kageyama	May 12, 1996
35	"Feeling Heartbroken - Ayumi!"; Transliteration: "Setsunai omoi - Ayumi!" (Japanese: せつない想い・歩！)	Akinori Yabe	Yumi Kageyama	May 19, 1996
36	"Body-ko's Melancholy"; Transliteration: "Badi-ko no yūutsu" (Japanese: バディ子のゆううつ)	Ryō Tachiba	Genki Yoshimura	May 26, 1996
37	"I Still Don't Want to Go Back..."; Transliteration: "Mada kaeritakunai..." (Japanese: まだ帰りたくない…)	Yasuo Yamayoshi	Genki Yoshimura	June 2, 1996
38	"Making the Most of 16"; Transliteration: "Hanpa janai 16-sai" (Japanese: ハンパじゃない16才)	Hiroshi Shidara	Aya Matsui	June 9, 1996
39	"What I Want the Most..."; Transliteration: "Ichiban hoshii mono wa..." (Japanese: 一番ほしいものは…)	Atsutoshi Umezawa	Yumi Kageyama	June 16, 1996
40	"The Albums with No Pictures"; Transliteration: "Shashin no nai arubamu" (Japanese: 写真のないアルバム)	Akinori Yabe	Yumi Kageyama	June 23, 1996
41	"A Message for Papa"; Transliteration: "Papa e no messēji" (Japanese: パパへのメッセージ)	Yoshihiro Oka	Yumi Kageyama	June 30, 1996
42	"Papa's Blue Skies"; Transliteration: "Papa no aoi sora" (Japanese: パパの青い空)	Ryō Tachiba	Yumi Kageyama	July 7, 1996
43	"Mama, Why...?"; Transliteration: "Mama, dōshite...?" (Japanese: ママ、どうして…？)	Yasuo Yamayoshi	Genki Yoshimura	July 14, 1996
44	"Storm Warnings"; Transliteration: "Arashi no maebure" (Japanese: 嵐のまえぶれ)	Atsutoshi Umezawa	Yumi Kageyama	July 21, 1996
45	"Bad at Lying"; Transliteration: "Uso o tsuku no wa... heta" (Japanese: 嘘をつくのは…ヘタ)	Akinori Yabe	Aya Matsui	July 28, 1996
46	"Before I Say I'm in Love With You..."; Transliteration: "Aishiteru nante..." (Japanese: 愛してるなんて…)	Yoshihiro Oka	Yumi Kageyama	August 4, 1996
47	"Mama!..."; Transliteration: "Mama!..." (Japanese: ママ！…)	Ryō Tachiba	Yumi Kageyama	August 11, 1996
48	"The Love You Have ..."; Transliteration: ""Ai" tte yatsu..." (Japanese: ″愛″ってやつ…)	Yasuo Yamayoshi	Yumi Kageyama	August 18, 1996
49	"The Second Proposal"; Transliteration: "Nidome no puropōzu" (Japanese: 二度めのプロポーズ)	Atsutoshi Umezawa	Aya Matsui	August 25, 1996
50	"Thank You, Everyone"; Transliteration: "Arigatō, minna" (Japanese: ありがとう、みんな)	Akinori Yabe	Genki Yoshimura	September 1, 1996

== Reception ==
Viz Media's English release won the Japan Society and Anime NYC's first American Manga Awards in the Best New Edition of Classic Manga Series category in 2024. In 2024, through a survey of 100 people by TV Maga (a web magazine operated by TV Log), Neighborhood Story was voted second for most fashionable manga, along with Paradise Kiss, another series by Yazawa.
