= Rumi Shishido =

Japanese singer and voice actress

- 宍戸 留美
- Born: November 6, 1973 (age 52); Fukuoka Prefecture, Japan
- Occupations: Singer; voice actress
- Years active: 1990–present
- Height: 160 cm (5 ft 3 in)
- Musical career
- Genres: J-pop; anime song
- Instrument: Vocals
- Labels: Sony Records; CD Records; Tower Records; Majix
- Formerly of: Nanatsuboshi
- Website: rumi-shishido.com

Rumi Shishido (宍戸 留美, Shishido Rumi; born November 6, 1973) is a Japanese singer and voice actress from Fukuoka Prefecture, Japan. Shishido debuted as an idol singer with Sony Records in 1990 with the single "Cosmic Rendezvous." In 1992, she left her management and began releasing music independently.

Around the same time Shishido left her management, she also debuted as a voice actress, with her breakthrough role being Mikako Koda from Neighborhood Story. Other notable roles she has played include Onpu Segawa from Ojamajo Doremi, Rosemary Applefield from Ashita no Nadja, Viper from Reborn!, M.O.M.O. from the Xenosaga series, Diana and Luna from the Jewelpet series, and June Amou from Pretty Rhythm: Rainbow Live and King of Prism.

== Early life ==
Shishido was born in Fukuoka Prefecture, Japan as the only daughter of an old Samurai family; her grandfather was a buddhist monk. When Shishido was two years old, she moved to Hiroshima with her mother after her parents divorced. She was a cheerleader at school. Prior to being scouted, she was studying abroad in Seattle, Washington.

== Career ==
=== Musical career ===
Citing Etsuko Ichihara as her inspiration, in 1989, Shishido decided to audition for a contest hosted by Lotte through the encouragement of her mother. At the age of 16, Shishido was selected as the winner out of 85,000 contestants and appeared on their television commercial in the following year. Shishido's debut single, titled "Cosmic Rendezvous", was released in 1990. Known by her idol nickname "Run Run" (るんるん, Run Run), Shishido also joined the members of Lip's and Rakutenshi to form the project group Nanatsuboshi. During her time as an idol, she faced strict regulations during public appearances and was not allowed to speak out of turn, nor was she allowed to befriend other idols from rival managements.

In 1992, Shishido terminated her contract, citing interest in other career paths such as acting and film. Shishido continued her singing career as an independent singer. Her first indie album, Set Me Free, released in 1995 and had cost ¥500,000 to produce. Shishido's album was positively received, and Neil Strauss of The New York Times compared her "ripe, melodic voice" to Debbie Gibson and Liz Phair.

Since meeting guitarist Kohei Shigihara, most of Shishido's music has been composed by him. The first song produced by the two was titled "Lion to Kyūka" (ライオンと休暇, Raion to Kyūka) in 2006, which Shishido describes as the song "[seeming] to have been [her] image" and that "[t]hough [she is] refreshing, [she sings] the sense of the vanity of life of the man and woman".

On May 9, 2010, Shishido celebrated her 20th anniversary in the music industry with a commemorative performance that was streamed live on Ustream. Shishido's performance set a record of having the most people view her video on the entire history of the website.

=== Voice acting career ===
Shishido's first start at a voice acting career was in 1992, when she voiced Uni Charm Password from the OVA series of KO Beast. In 1995, she broke through with her first leading role as Mikako Koda from Neighborhood Story and was encouraged to audition after producer Hiromi Seki had heard her speaking voice through her album, Do-Re-Mi-Fa-So-La-Ti-Do-Shi-Shi-Do-Ru-Mi. Shishido auditioned for the role of Doremi in Ojamajo Doremi but did not get the part. Despite that, she was later cast as Onpu, a role that boosted her popularity as a voice actress.

== Filmography ==
=== Film ===
Year	Title	Role	Notes
1996	Gokinjo Monogatari	Mikako Kōda	
2000	Ojamajo Doremi # The Movie	Onpu Segawa	
2001	Mōtto! Ojamajo Doremi: Kaeru Seki no Himitsu	Onpu Segawa	
2017	King of Prism: Pride the Hero	June Amou	
2019	King of Prism: Shiny Seven Stars	June Amou	
2020	Looking for Magical Doremi	Onpu Segawa	

=== Television ===
Year	Title	Role	Notes
1995	Gokinjo Monogatari	Mikako Kōda	
1996	Hana Yori Dango	Sakurako Sanjō	
1999	Ojamajo Doremi	Onpu Segawa	Voice
2000	Ojamajo Doremi #	Onpu Segawa	
2001	Mōtto! Ojamajo Doremi	Onpu Segawa	
2002	Ojamajo Doremi Dokkān!	Onpu Segawa	
2002	Digimon Frontier	Lopmon	
2003	Ashita no Nadja	Rosemary Applefield	
2003	Popotan	Shizuku	
2003	Zatch Bell!	Laila	Season 2
2004	Ojamajo Doremi Na-i-sho	Onpu Segawa	
2005	Xenosaga: The Animation	M.O.M.O.	
2005	Paradise Kiss	Mikako Kōda	
2005	Onegai My Melody	Takao Miyamae	Episode 29
2005	Animal Yokocho	Iyo	
2005	Twin Princess of Wonder Planet	Pearl	
2006	Powerpuff Girls Z	Sakurako Kintoki/Sedusa	
2006	The Story of Saiunkoku	Sa Shunki	
2006	Welcome to the N.H.K.	Nanako Midorikawa, Pururin, Torotoro	
2006	Reborn!	Viper/Mammon	
2007	The Story of Saiunkoku: Second Series	Sa Shunki	
2009	Jewelpet	Diana, Luna	
2010	Jewelpet Twinkle	Diana, Luna	
2010	Highschool of the Dead	Naomi	Episode 3
2011	Jewelpet Sunshine	Diana, Luna	Episodes 5, 14, 25, 27, 31, 37, 41
2012	Jewelpet Kira Deco	Luna	
2013	Pretty Rhythm: Rainbow Live	June Amō	
2013	Jewelpet Happiness	Luna	
2019	Kiratto Pri Chan	Sara's mother	

=== OVA ===
Year	Title	Role	Notes
2004	Netrun-mon	Biscuit-tan	

=== Original Net Animation ===
Year	Title	Role	Notes
2008	Penguin Musume Heart	Aka	
2019	Ojamajo Doremi: Owarai Gekijou	Onpu Segawa	

=== Video games ===
Year	Title	Role	Notes
2002	Xenosaga Episode I: Der Wille zur Macht	M.O.M.O	
2004	Xenosaga Freaks	M.O.M.O.	
2004	Xenosaga Episode II: Jenseits von Gut und Böse	M.O.M.O.	
2005	Namco × Capcom	M.O.M.O.	
2006	Xenosaga Episode III: Also sprach Zarathustra	M.O.M.O.	
2007	Agarest: Generations of War	Fyuria	
2007	Tales of Innocence	Chitose Cxarma	
2010	Super Robot Wars OG Saga: Endless Frontier Exceed	M.O.M.O., Hal Gand	
2019	Puyo Puyo Quest	Onpu Segawa	
2026	Xenoblade Chronicles 2: Nintendo Switch 2 Edition	M.O.M.O.	

=== CD Drama ===
- Digimon Drama CD Natsu e No Tobira as Natsu-chan

=== Live-action films ===
Year	Title	Role	Notes
2005	Nana	Sakagami	
2006	Nana 2	Sakagami	
2015	The End of the World and the Cat's Disappearance	Itsuko's Mom	

=== Dubbing ===
- Hello Kitty's Furry Tale Theater - Fangora

== Discography ==
=== Studio albums ===
- Do-Re-Mi-Fa-So-La-Ti-Do-Shi-Shi-Do-Ru-Mi (1990)
- Punsuka (1992)
- Set Me Free (1995)
- Shinya Haikai (1997)
- Bambi Garden (1999)
- Rumi Roll (2003)
- Cherbourgh → Brighton (2010)
- Onna (2012)
- Luminescence (2013)
- Eight (2017)

=== Compilation albums ===
- Idol Miracle Bible Series: Rumi Shishido (2005)

=== Singles ===
Title	Year	Peak position	Album
Title	Year	JPN	Album
"Cosmic Rendezvous" (コズミック・ランデブー)	1990	61	Do-Re-Mi-Fa-So-La-Shi-Do-Shi-Shi-Do-Ru-Mi
"Naku yo Idol Heisei Ni-nen" (ナクヨアイドル平成2年)	1990	60	Non-album single
"Panic in My Room"	1991	—	Do-Re-Mi-Fa-So-La-Shi-Do-Shi-Shi-Do-Ru-Mi
"Chikyū no Kiki" (地球の危機)	1991	75	Do-Re-Mi-Fa-So-La-Shi-Do-Shi-Shi-Do-Ru-Mi
"Otokonoko" (おとこのこ)	1991	—	Non-album single
"Otokonoko ga Naichau Nante (La-Da-Dee)" (男のコが泣いちゃうなんて（La-Da-Dee）)	1991	—	Non-album single
"Koi wa Maketerare Nation" (恋はマケテラレネーション)	1992	93	Non-album single
"He-ro-i-ne" (ヒ・ロ・イ・ン)	1995	—	Non-album single
"Don't You Know?!"	1995	—	Non-album single
"Sunao ni Natte" (素直になって)	1996	—	Non-album single
"NG!"	1996	—	Non-album single
"Shinya Hakai" (深夜徘徊)	1997	—	Non-album single
"—" denotes releases that did not chart or were not released in that region.
