= Mermaid (disambiguation) =

A mermaid is a mythical creature with the upper body of a woman and the lower body of a fish.

Mermaid may also refer to:

== Places ==
=== Australia ===
- Mermaid Beach, Queensland, a suburb of the Gold Coast
- Mermaid Reach, a reach of the Brisbane River, Queensland
- Mermaid Reef, one of three reefs that make up Rowley Shoals, Western Australia
- Mermaid Waters, Queensland, a suburb of the Gold Coast
- Mermaids Cave, Blue Mountains, New South Wales, a site where an unknown creature was found

=== United Kingdom ===
- Mermaid Quay, a shopping and leisure complex in Cardiff Bay, Wales
- The Mermaid (river), a watercourse in Norfolk, England

== Arts, entertainment, and media ==
=== Literature ===
- The Mermaid, alternative title for "The Little Mermaid" (Den lille havfrue) by Hans Christian Andersen

=== Films ===
- The Mermaid (1910 film), a 1910 film by the Thanhouser Company
- The Mermaid (1965 film), a 1965 Hong Kong film
- Mermaids (1990 film), 1990 film starring Cher, Bob Hoskins, Winona Ryder, and Christina Ricci
  - Mermaids (soundtrack)
- Mermaid (1996 film), originally Rusalka, a 1996 animated short film by Aleksandr Petrov
- Mermaid (2000 film), directed by Peter Masterson
- Mermaids (2003 film), starring Erika Heynatz
- Mermaid (2007 film) (Russian: Русалка, Rusalka), 2007 film directed by Anna Melikian
- Mermaids: The Body Found, a 2012 documentary-style television film
- The Mermaid (2016 film), a Chinese film
- Mermaid (2025 film), an American film

=== Music ===
- Mermaidens, an indie rock band from New Zealand

==== Classical ====
- The Mermaid (ballad), from the 18th century
- Die Seejungfrau or The Mermaid, by Alexander von Zemlinsky
- The Mermaid, a choral song by Ralph Vaughan Williams (1872–1958)

==== Songs ====
- "Mermaid" (Hitomi Shimatani song)
- "Mermaid" (Train song), from their 2012 album California 37
- "Mermaid", a song by Jay Chou from the 2014 album Aiyo, Not Bad
- "Kanshō/Mermaid", a 2003 song by Aya Ueto
- "The Mermaid" (Shel Silverstein song), by Shel Silverstein
- "The Mermaid", recorded by the American quintet Bounding Main and released on their 2005 album Maiden Voyage

=== Visual artworks ===
- A Mermaid, a 1900 oil painting by J. W. Waterhouse
- Mermaid (Lichtenstein), a 1979 Roy Lichtenstein outdoor sculpture in Miami Beach
- Mermaid (Carl-Nielsen), a 1921 bronze sculpture
- The Mermaids (Kramskoi), an 1871 oil painting

=== Other arts, entertainment, and media ===
- Mermaid, a character from The Legendary Starfy video game series
- Mermaid Series, editions of English Renaissance and Restoration dramatists (named after the Mermaid Tavern, above)
- The Idle Mermaid, a 2014 South Korean romantic comedy television series
- Cure Mermaid, a character in Go! Princess PreCure

== Brands and enterprises ==
- Mermaids Casino, Las Vegas, Nevada
- Mermaids (charity), a UK charity which supports transgender youth
- The Mermaid Inn (disambiguation)

== Science ==
- MERMAID, a marine scientific instrument platform, short for Mobile Earthquake Recorder for Marine Areas by Independent Divers

== Vessels ==
- Mermaid (dinghy), a sailing dinghy designed by Roger Hancock
- Mermaid, Kenichi Horie's first solo voyage sailboat
- CZAW Mermaid, an amphibious flying boat aircraft
- Dublin Bay Mermaid, a class of sailing dinghy originated by Dublin Bay Sailing Club, Ireland
- HMAS Mermaid (A 02), a 1989 Royal Australian Navy survey motor launch
- HMS Mermaid, various ships in the British Royal Navy
  - Mermaid-class destroyer, a class of two Royal Navy destroyers in the First World War
  - Mermaid-class frigate, a class of six sailing warships built in the eighteenth century.
- Seaview Mermaid, a class of racing keelboat based at the Sea View Yacht Club, Isle of Wight

== Other uses ==
- Mermaid (Ninurta), in Sumerian mythology, one of the Heroes slain by Ninurta
- Mermaid, a hybrid tea rose cultivar
- Fiji mermaid, a hoax presented by PT Barnum
- Mermaid syndrome or Sirenomelia, a congenital deformity that gives an appearance of a mermaid
- Mermaiding, wearing a costume mermaid tail, often while swimming
- Mermaid, the ICAO radio callsign of Air Alsie, a small airline and charter company based in Sonderborg, Denmark
- Mermaid (software), an open-source JavaScript-based diagramming and charting tool

== See also ==
- Merman
- The Little Mermaid (disambiguation)
