= List of The Little Mermaid adaptations =

This is a list of The Little Mermaid adaptations. It is restricted to direct adaptations of Hans Christian Andersen's fairy tale "The Little Mermaid".

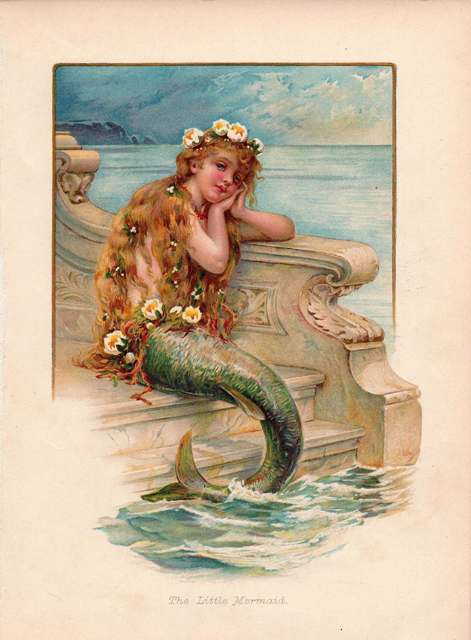
Illustration of The Little Mermaid, mid-19th century, by E. S. Hardy

== Print ==
- Classics Illustrated Junior (1950s), an American comic book series, published a print version in issue No. 525.
- Dyesebel (1952), a Filipino comic book series by Mars Ravelo loosely based on Hans Christian Andersen's story. It has been adapted into feature films and television shows.
- Angel's Hill (Angel no Oka, 1960), a manga by Osamu Tezuka.
- My Love, My Love; or The Peasant Girl (1985), a magical realism novel by Rosa Guy, loosely based on the fairy tale and set in early 20th-century Haiti. It follows an orphaned Black peasant girl who falls in love with a wealthy young mulatto on an island divided by ethnic and social tensions.
- Sword of Destiny (1992) by Andrzej Sapkowski includes a short story "A Little Sacrifice" loosely based on Andersen's tale.
- Mermaid Panic (1996), a light novel series by Marie Koizumi that loosely reimagines the classic fairy tale, featuring illustrations by acclaimed manga artist Naoko Takeuchi.
- Princess Mermaid (2002), a print adaptation by Japanese artist Junko Mizuno as the third and final part of her "fractured fairy tales".
- Mermaid: A Twist on the Classic Tale (2001), a novel by Carolyn Turgeon, focuses on the mermaid, Lenia, and the human princess, Margrete, as they both fall for the same prince and seek to marry him.
- The Mermaid's Madness (2010), a book adaptation by Jim C. Hines, in which the mermaid, Lirea, is on a quest of revenge on the human prince who used her, having been driven insane due to a side effect of her transformation.
- The Little Android (2014), a short story adaptation by Marissa Meyer as part of The Lunar Chronicles series and appearing in the collection Stars Above. The main character is reinterpreted as an android named Mech6.0.
- Drown: A Twisted Take on the Classic Fairy Tale (2015) by Esther Dalseno, a darker reimagining that presents the Sea Witch as the creator of the merfolk, a race portrayed with primal, animalistic behavior.
- The Mer Chronicles by Tobie Easton (2016–2019), a young adult novel series focusing on a distant relative of the Little Mermaid in modern times and her own romance with a human.
- The Little Mermaid (2017), a graphic novel adaptation by Metaphrog.
- The Mermaid's Daughter (2017) by Ann Claycomb centers on Kathleen Conarn, an Irish-American opera student and descendant of the Little Mermaid. Since her sixteenth birthday, she has suffered from mysterious pains in her throat and feet, and is tormented by a family curse that has led many of her ancestors to tragic ends. Kathleen eventually discovers that to break the curse, she must become a mermaid, a transformation that can only occur if she kills her true love with her ancestor's dagger and spills his blood on her legs.
- To Kill a Kingdom (2018) by Alexandra Christo, a young adult novel in which a siren princess Lira is sent to kill a siren-hunting prince named Elian but ends up falling in love with him. Together, they defeat Lira's mother, the wicked sea queen.
- Sea Witch (2018) and Sea Witch Rising (2019), by Sarah Henning, are a YA novel duology focused on the character of the sea witch, beginning with her life as a human girl in 19th-century Denmark. She sets out to help a mermaid win a prince's heart, but is betrayed and transformed into the sea witch of legend.
- When Water Sang Fire (2017), by Leigh Bardugo, is a short story set in the Grishaverse and published in the collection The Language of Thorns. It tells an origin story for the sea witch, Ulla, as an ostracized young mermaid, and recounts how the underwater sildroher race lost their magic.
- The Magic Fish (2020), a semi-autobiographical graphic novel by Trung Le Nguyen, uses classic fairy tales to mirror the protagonist's struggles with his sexuality. It features a modern, queer retelling of The Little Mermaid, where the mermaid, unable to win the affections of the human man she saved, finds salvation in the woman he loves.
- Skin of the Sea (2021), a young adult novel by Natasha Bowen that mixes the tale with West African religious traditions.
- Kiss of the Selkie (2021), a young adult novel by Tessonja Odette, part of the Entangled with Fae series, retells the story with a runaway selkie princess named Maisie as the lead. She saves a man from drowning, only to learn that he was sentenced to die by the Unseelie Queen of the Sea. Maisie is sent undercover at a bridal competition to assassinate him, but feels conflicted as she gets to know him.
- Beasts and Beauty: Dangerous Tales (2021), an anthology of twisted fairy tales by Soman Chainani, features a retelling in which the Sea Witch, the Sea King's spurned ex-lover, warns the mermaid against pursuing the prince from her own experience.
- The Salt Grows Heavy (2023) by Cassandra Khaw is a horror novella in which, after the destruction of her kingdom and death of her cruel husband, the little mermaid joins a mysterious plague doctor to investigate a cult.
- Upon a Starlit Tide (2025) by Kell Woods is a historical fantasy novel set in Saint-Malo, Brittany in 1758. Based on both The Little Mermaid and Cinderella, it follows Lucinde "Luce" Leon, a young woman with dreams of leaving behind her stifling life and sailing the sea. Suffering from a foot deformity that pains her with every step, she soon discovers a growing power within her and her true heritage as a sea-maid.

== Film ==
- Hans Christian Andersen (1952), features a ballet segment adaptation within the film.
- Fantasia 3 (1966), a Spanish anthology film, opens with the adaptation segment "Coralina: La Doncella del Mar" starring Dyanik Zurakowska. In this adaptation of the story the mermaid doesn't give up her voice in exchange to become human.
- The Daydreamer (1966), a Rankin/Bass film that combines live-action and stop-motion, features a stop-motion segment adaptation in the film.
- The Little Mermaid (Russian: Русалочка) (1968), a 29-minute Soviet Union animated film by film studio Soyuzmultfilm and directed by Ivan Aksenchuk.
- The Little Mermaid (Ningyo Hime) (1974), a stop-motion short film directed by Yasukuri Ichikawa.
- Hans Christian Andersen's The Little Mermaid (Anderusen Dowa Ningyo Hime) (1975), an anime feature film directed by Tomoharu Katsumata.
- Malá mořská víla (1976), a live-action Czechoslovak film directed by Karel Kachyňa and starring Miroslava Šafránková as the Little Mermaid, Radovan Lukavský as the King of the Seas, Petr Svojtka as the Prince, Milena Dvorská as the Sea Witch and Miroslava's sister, Libuše Šafránková, as the Princess. It features a score by Zdeněk Liška. Omitting Andersen's ending, the film ends with the Little Mermaid's death as she cannot bring herself to kill the Prince. Interestingly, the film eschews the traditional portrayal of merpeople with fish tails and presents them as water spirits.
- Rusalochka (Русалочка) (1976), a live-action Russian film that was a joint production by the USSR and Bulgaria; directed by Vladimir Bychkov and starring Vyctoriya Novikova as the mermaid.
- Splash (1984), it is one of the first films produced by Touchstone Films, a Disney company, which specialized in films also aimed at adult audiences, starring Daryl Hannah as Madison.
- The Little Mermaid (1989), an animated film by Walt Disney Feature Animation and released by Walt Disney Pictures, starring Jodi Benson as the voice of Ariel. The film launched a franchise that was continued with a sequel: The Little Mermaid II: Return to the Sea (2000), and a prequel: The Little Mermaid: Ariel's Beginning (2008).
- The Little Mermaid (1992), an animated film by American Film Investment Corporation II that was distributed originally by Trimark Pictures, and later by GoodTimes Entertainment.
- The Little Mermaid (1998), a 50-minute animated adaptation by Burbank Animation Studios.
- Rusalka (2007), a Russian film by Anna Melikyan, set in modern-day Russia.
- Ponyo (2008), an animated Hayao Miyazaki film based loosely on the story.
- Little from the Fish Shop (2014), a modern-day stop-motion film adaptation by Czech artist Jan Balej.
- The Silver Moonlight (2015), an experimental film by Russian-born filmmaker Evgueni Mlodik, retelling the story of The Little Mermaid in the style of a 1930s German melodrama made under the Nazis.
- The Lure (2015), a Polish film based on the Hans Christian Andersen story.
- Big Fish & Begonia (2016), a Chinese animated fantasy film heavily influenced by Andersen's fairy tale. It follows a sixteen-year-old mystical girl who journeys to the human world as a dolphin and forms a bond with a human boy, eventually sacrificing part of her lifespan for him.
- Little Mermaid (2017), an indie film set in the modern day with Rosie Mac as the titular character.
- The Little Mermaid (2018), an indie film based on the original Andersen fairytale set in Mississippi with Poppy Drayton as the titular character.
- The Little Mermaid (2023), a live-action remake of the 1989 film directed by Rob Marshall and starring Halle Bailey as Ariel and Melissa McCarthy as Ursula. It reincorporates elements from the original story omitted from the animated adaptation, most notably the mermaids’ inability to cry.
- The Little Mermaid (2023), an animated film produced by The Asylum.
- The Little Mermaid (2024), a horror film.
- ChaO (2025), a romantic comedy anime film inspired by the fairy tale, set in a futuristic Shanghai where humans and merfolk coexist. It follows a mild-mannered office worker whose life is turned upside down when a shapeshifting mermaid princess proposes to him.
- The Deadly Little Mermaid (2026), a horror film.

== Television ==
- Shirley Temple's Storybook (1961), a television anthology that broadcast a one-hour adaptation as an episode.
- Malá mořská víla (1966), a made-for-TV Czech adaptation with Susanna Martinková as the mermaid.
- Mahō no Mako-chan (1970), an anime television series loosely based on the story, ran for 48 episodes.
- Andersen monogatari (1971), an anime television series based on Andersen's stories, as a three half-hour episodes adaptation.
- The Little Mermaid (1974), a 30-minute animated version presented by Reader's Digest magazine, narrated by Richard Chamberlain.
- Manga Fairy Tales of the World (1976), an anime television series based on fairy tales and literature classics features a 10-minute adaptation.
- My Favorite Fairy Tales (Sekai Dōwa Anime Zenshū) (1986), an anime OVA anthology, has a 12-minute adaptation.
- Faerie Tale Theatre (1987), a television anthology produced by Shelley Duvall, has a one-hour live-action adaptation starring Pam Dawber as the mermaid, Treat Williams as the prince, Karen Black as the sea witch and Helen Mirren as the other princess.
- Adventures of the Little Mermaid (1991), an Fuji Television anime television series adaptation that ran for 26 episodes.
- The Little Mermaid (1992), an animated television series based on the 1989 film that ran for 31 episodes.
- Marsupilami (1993), an animated television series, featured Sebastian segments based on a character from the 1989 film.
- World Fairy Tale Series (Sekai meisaku dōwa shirīzu – Wa-o! Meruhen ōkoku) (1995), an anime series based on popular tales, as a half-hour adaptation.
- Happily Ever After: Fairy Tales for Every Child (1997), an animated television anthology series, has an East Asian-influenced retelling featuring the voices of Tia Carrere and Robert Guillaume.
- Pokémon: Indigo League (1998), an anime television series, broadcast episode 61, "The Misty Mermaid", that was inspired by the story.
- The Fairytaler (alternately titled as Tales from H.C. Andersen), a Danish animated television anthology, has a half-hour adaptation directed by Jorgen Lerdam in 2003.
- Mermaid Melody Pichi Pichi Pitch (2002), an anime television series, was inspired by the story.
- Fairy Tale Police Department (2002), an Australian animated television series, has one episode that is based on the story.
- Hans Christian Andersen: My Life as a Fairytale (2003), features the most accurate depiction of Andersen's original text, as this version includes many disturbing story elements often omitted in most adaptations, such as the sea witch cutting off the mermaid's tongue as payment in exchange for her magic potion, the mermaid's feet bleeding whenever she walks or dances and the mermaid's older sisters giving their hair to the sea witch in exchange for the dagger their youngest sister needs to murder the prince and recover her mermaid tail. The mermaid briefly considers fatally stabbing the prince and his bride on their wedding bed, but cannot bring herself to do so, dropping the dagger. She slowly walks towards an open window. The prince awakens and tries to stop her, but the mermaid's figure softly vanishes as she reaches the light. It was directed by Philip Saville and stars Emily Hamilton as the Little Mermaid, Miranda Pleasence as the Sea Witch and Kieran Bew as the Prince. Bew also plays Hans Christian Andersen in the miniseries' main storyline.
- The Triplets (2003), features an adaptation which, in comparison to other animated versions, remains remarkably faithful to the story's melancholic tone and core elements (most notably its bittersweet ending) despite some minor changes. It was aired during the series' second season as episode No. 26 (#91 of the entire series).
- Queen's Blade (2009), A side-story focused on princess mermaids, Tiina of Seabed.
- Simsala Grimm (2010), an animated German television anthology, broadcast a half-hour adaptation.
- Puella Magi Madoka Magica (2011), an anime series, has hints of "The Little Mermaid" in Sayaka Miki's story arc, which involves losing her unrequited crush to another girl and "losing her soul" in a sense, becoming a creature with a mermaid-like design.
- Once Upon a Time (2013), an ABC television series, uses characters and elements of the 1989 animated Disney film.
- In the animated series Ever After High the Little Mermaid has a daughter, Meeshell Mermaid.
- Die kleine Meerjungfrau (2013), a live-action made-for-TV German adaptation directed by Irina Popow and starring Zoe Moore as Undine, part of the series Sechs auf einen Streich.
- The Idle Mermaid (2014), a South Korean television serial modern retelling that ran for 10 episodes.
- Betoolot (2014), an Israeli TV series that follows the story of a modern family in which all the females have the characteristics of being a mermaid. The series has 28 episodes in 3 seasons.
- Hug! PreCure (2018), an anime series part of the Pretty Cure franchise, broadcast episode 32, "Is This Magic? Homare is a Mermaid Princess!", that was inspired by the story.
- Regal Academy (2018). In the second season of the series, the Little Mermaid appears as a recurring character.
- The Little Mermaid Live! (2019), a musical television special based on the Disney animated film, featuring additional songs from its Broadway adaptation.
- Tropical-Rouge! Pretty Cure (2021), an anime series part of the Pretty Cure franchise, uses Christian Andersen's fairy tale as a recurring theme. Laura La Mer, one of the main characters, and the Witch of Delays, the primary antagonist, are loosely based on the titular mermaid and the Sea Witch respectively.
- Drag Race Philippines (2023), in the second season of the series, the cast performs a musical number based on Andersen's fairy tale.
- Ariel (2024; currently airing), an animated television series based on the 2023 Disney film.
- Goodbye, Lara (2026), an anime series produced by Kinema Citrus in celebration of the studio's 15th anniversary. The story reimagines and continues Hans Christian Andersen’s tale, following Lara, a beloved mermaid princess who serves as a beacon of light to her underwater world. After saving a human prince and falling in love with him, she is persuaded by her banished sea-witch aunt, Grace, to become human and pursue his love. But when the prince rejects her after discovering she is a mermaid, Lara vanishes into foam. Two centuries later, Lara is resurrected in Japan’s Lake Biwa, where she discovers that her kingdom has fallen and her family has been placed in an enchanted sleep by Grace. They can only awaken once Lara finds true love. As she searches for it while navigating the modern human world, Lara makes new friends, reconnects with familiar faces, learns to appreciate life’s simple joys, and discovers the true meaning of love.

== Theatre ==
- Rusalka (1901), an opera with music composed by Dvořák, was first performed in Prague. It incorporates plot elements from the Andersen story and from de la Motte Fouqué's Undine (e.g. the Witch is from Andersen and the Water Goblin is from Fouqué).
- The Garden of Paradise (1914), a play written by Edward Sheldon.
- The Little Mermaid (1923), an opera written and composed by Gian Carlo Menotti (lost).
- La Petite Sirène (1957), a three-act opera version by French composer Germaine Tailleferre, with a libretto adapted by Philippe Soupault.
- Once on This Island (1990), a musical based on Rosa Guy's novel My Love, My Love; or The Peasant Girl, in turn based on Andersen's story.
- De Kleine Zeemeermin (2004), a stage musical adaptation by Studio 100 directed by Gert Verhulst, with music by Johan Vanden Eede. The show premiered in Belgium in 2004 starring Free Souffriau as the mermaid, and then transferred to the Netherlands where Kim-Lian and Kathleen Aerts portrayed the mermaid.
- The Little Mermaid (2005), a modern-rendition ballet by the Royal Danish Ballet, composed by Russian-American composer Lera Auerbach and choreographed by John Neumeier, premiered on 15 April 2005.
- The Little Mermaid (2008), a Broadway stage musical based on the 1989 Disney film, with music by Alan Menken and lyrics by Howard Ashman and Glenn Slater. The show premiered on 10 January 2008 at the Lunt-Fontanne Theatre.
- John Neumeier's The Little Mermaid (2010), a production of the San Francisco Ballet, premiered on 20 March 2010.
- Below (2013), a stage adaptation by Adapt Theatre Productions, a small fringe-theatre production company in Chicago, Illinois. The story is written in blank verse by actor/playwright Lane Flores and is from the perspective of the little mermaid's sisters, who have kidnapped the story's prince to judge his compassion for their deceased sister.
- The Little Mermaid (2013), a family show (play with music), dialogue by Joel Horwood, staged by Simon Godwin for the Bristol Old Vic, Bristol UK.
- The Little Mermaid (2013), a theatrical adaptation by Blind Tiger, a London-based Actor Musician theatre company, focuses on Hans Christian Andersen's influences when creating the fairytale. The show opened in December 2013 at Riverside Studios.
- The Little Mermaid (2017) a ballet with choreography by David Nixon and a score by Sally Beamish was staged by Northern Ballet in Leeds, Sheffield and other venues in the north of England in the winter of 2017 and 2018. Revived on tour 2022.
- Unfortunate (2023), a musical parody of Disney's 1989 animation staged at the Southbank Playhouse in London from 4 January 2023 to 17 February, then touring to 14 July.
- The Little Mermaid (2024), a musical with an environmental awareness storyline in which the mermaid seeks to save the coral reefs in her home the sea, staged at the Bristol Old Vic.
- Sea Witch (2026), a musical based on Sarah Henning’s novel of the same name. It is scheduled to open on March 3, 2026, at the Theatre Royal Drury Lane in London, with actress Natalie Paris in the lead role.

== Audio ==
- Die Seejungfrau (The Mermaid, 1903), a 47-minute-long symphonic poem by Austrian composer Alexander von Zemlinsky.
- Tale Spinners for Children: The Little Mermaid (UAC 11042), an audio dramatization of the story with Denise Bryer and the Famous Theatre Company with music by Edvard Grieg.
- "Little Mermaid" (1982), a song by Japanese jazz-fusion band The Square (now known as T-Square), released on the album Magic.
- The Little Mermaid (Die kleine Meerjungfrau, 2007), an orchestral piece by Lior Navok for an actress, two pianos and a chamber ensemble/orchestra, premiered on 28 July 2007.
- "人魚姫/Ningyo Hime" ("The Little Mermaid") and "リトマメ/Rito Mame" ("Little Mermaid", 2009), a pair of songs produced using the Vocaloid software, based on the story.
- "Ningyo No Namida" ("Tears of the Mermaid", 2009), a song by Japanese visual kei band LM.C, is loosely based on the story.
- "Mermaid Girl" by Cream puff and moimoi, a song first seen in beatmania IIDX 18 Resort Anthem is based on the story.
- "The Great Mermaid" (2022), a song by South Korean girl group LE SSERAFIM, puts a twist on the classic fairy tale by rejecting the traditional theme of self-sacrifice for love. Instead, it portrays the mermaid as a figure who embraces her voice and independence.
- The Little Mermaid, a 2023 Audible Original adapted by Dina Gregory from the Hans Christian Andersen story and is narrated by Leigh-Anne Pinnock.
- "Bipolar Mermaid" for piano, by Beatrice Berrut, broadcast on BBC Radio 3 "In Tune" 13 October 2023.
