= The Little Mermaid (disambiguation) =

"The Little Mermaid" is a fairy tale by Hans Christian Andersen.

The Little Mermaid may also refer to:

- The Little Mermaid (statue), in Copenhagen
- The Little Mermaid, a symbol featured in the coat of arms of Warsaw, Poland

== Film, television, theatre ==
- The Little Mermaid (1968 film), a Russian animated 29-minute film
- Hans Christian Andersen's The Little Mermaid (1975 film), a Japanese anime film by Toei
- The Little Mermaid (1974 film), an animated 30-minute film produced by Gerald Potterton and directed by Peter Sander
- The Little Mermaid (1976 Czech film), a live-action film directed by Karel Kachyňa
- The Little Mermaid (1976 Russian film), a live-action film directed by Vladimir Bychkov
- The Little Mermaid (1980 film), a French romantic drama film directed by Roger Andrieux
- "The Little Mermaid" (Faerie Tale Theatre), a live-action television episode
- "The Little Mermaid", an episode of the animated television episode Super Why!
- The Little Mermaid (franchise), comprising:
  - The Little Mermaid (1989 film), an animated film from Walt Disney Pictures
  - The Little Mermaid (TV series), based on the Disney film
  - The Little Mermaid (video game), based on the Disney film
  - The Little Mermaid II: Return to the Sea, a 2000 direct-to-video sequel to the Disney film
  - The Little Mermaid: Ariel's Beginning, a 2008 direct-to-video prequel to the Disney film
  - The Little Mermaid (musical), based on Disney's animated film
  - The Little Mermaid Live!, a 2019 musical television special based on the Disney film
  - The Little Mermaid (2023 film) a live-action film adaptation of the Disney original
- Saban's Adventures of the Little Mermaid, a 1991 Japanese anime TV series by Fuji Eight
- The Little Mermaid, a 2005 ballet with music by Lera Auerbach and choreography by John Neumeier
- The Little Mermaid, a live-action made-for-TV German adaptation directed by Irina Popow
- The Little Mermaid, a 2016 live action film starring Rosie Mac
- The Little Mermaid, a 2017 ballet with music by Sally Beamish
- The Little Mermaid (2018 film), a live-action film directed by Blake Harris

== Music ==
- The Little Mermaid (1989 soundtrack), for the 1989 Disney film
  - The Little Mermaid: Songs from the Sea, original songs inspired by the Disney film
- Disney's The Little Mermaid (2008 album), the original Broadway cast recording of the Disney musical
- The Little Mermaid (2023 soundtrack), for the 2023 Disney film
- Die Seejungfrau, a symphonic poem written in 1903 by Alexander von Zemlinsky

== Other ==
- Little Mermaid (comics), either of two heroines in the Global Guardians team from DC Comics
- The Little Mermaid: Ariel's Undersea Adventure, an attraction at Disney's California Adventure park and Disney's Magic Kingdom Park
- La Sirenita, a professional wrestler

== See also ==
- Mermaid (disambiguation)
