= Bolwick Hall =

Coordinates: 52.772743°N 1.259088°E

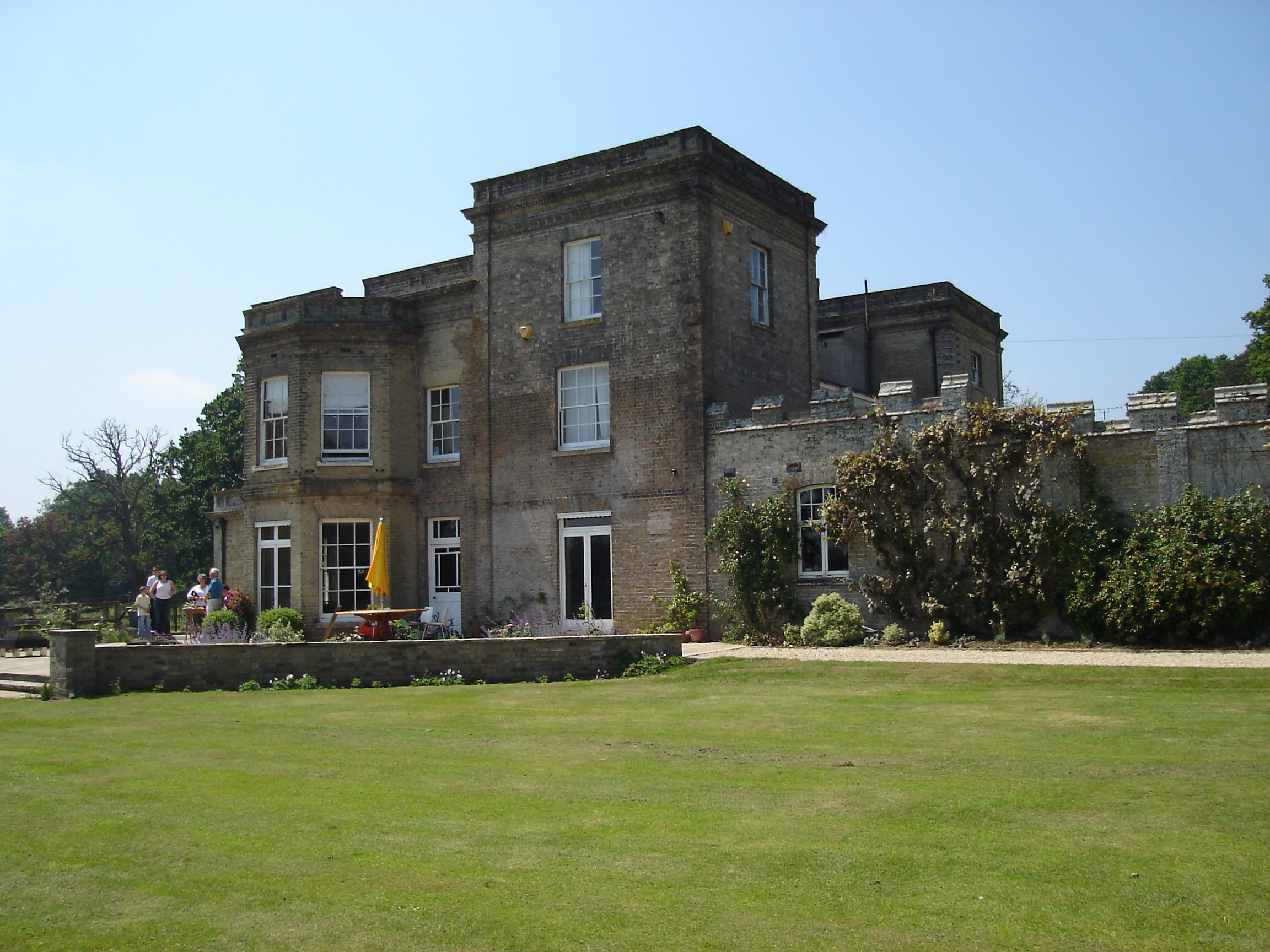
Bolwick Hall

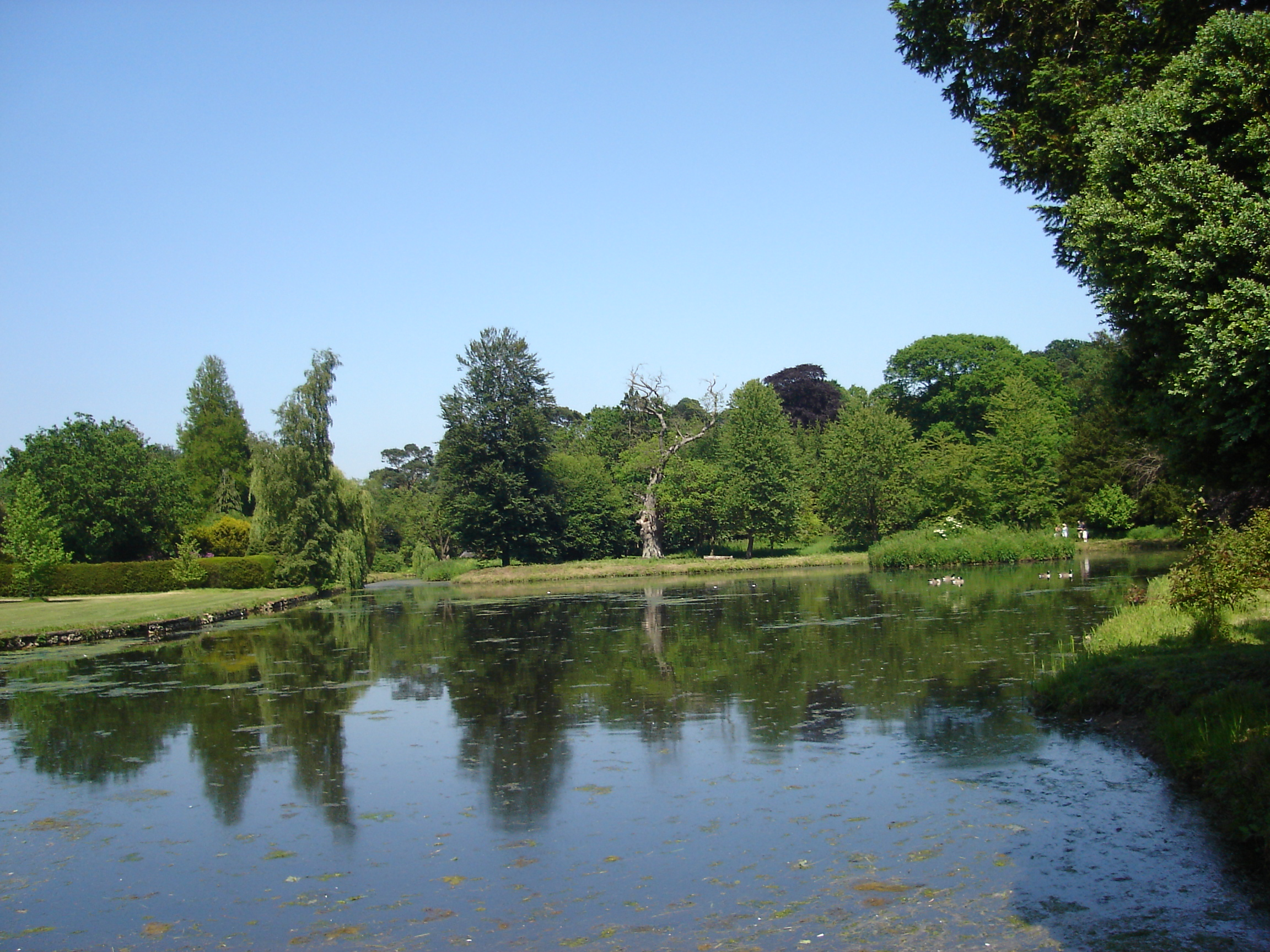
The lake

Bolwick Hall is located at Marsham, Norfolk, 1 mile south of Aylsham.

== History ==
The hall is recorded in the Domesday Book of 1086 and given to King John I by Hugh de Boves and then passed to Henry de Bolevic. By 1872 the hall had only changed ownership on 11 occasions. The present exterior was added in c.1800. Architecture such as Saxon and Tudor can be seen.

== Gardens ==
Landscaped gardens and parkland surrounding the late Georgian hall (not open to the public), are attributed to Humphry Repton. The gardens include a collection of mature trees, a working vegetable garden, woodland and lakeside walks. The ornamental lake was formed by the damming of The Mermaid a minor tributary of the River Bure to provide water for the Bolwick watermill. The garden is open to the public once a year under the National Gardens Scheme.

== Bolwick watermill ==
The watermill was an estate mill, originally belonging to the hall. The final structure was completed in 1812 and renovated in 1889. The mill was below the level of the dammed Bolwick lake and because the volume of water produced by the Mermaid was not great, the watermill had one of the largest diameter wheels in the county at 28 feet (8.5 m). The building survived to 1965.

== Notable residents ==
- Gerard Anstruther Wathen CIE (1878-1958) as entered - " Wathen of Bolwick Hall formally of Beckenham Lodge " in Burke's Landed Gentry. Wathen was a Companion of the Order of the Indian Empire, principal of Khalsa College, Amritsar, India (1914 - 1924) and the headmaster of Hall School Hampstead, (1924-1955). He married Melicent, daughter of Charles Louis Buxton of Bolwick Hall.
- John Warnes (fl. 1807–1847) and Louisa Blencowe Everard, prominent early 19th-century landowners. Warnes, an Aylsham timber merchant, purchased the estate in 1807 and operated it as a primary family seat. White's 1845 History, Gazetteer, and Directory of Norfolk explicitly records him as the lord of the manor of Bolwick Hall. Through his marriage to Louisa Blencowe Everard, the daughter of Captain James Everard, the estate was connected to the historic armorial lineages of the Blencowe family. The family's official armorial bearings mapping them to the residence were later registered in Burke's Visitation of Seats and Arms.
- John Warnes Jr. (fl. 1840s), son of John Warnes, who was an influential pioneer in the British agricultural sector while residing at the estate. He published several foundational treatises on cattle-fattening, summer-grazing layouts, and regional flax cultivation directly from Bolwick Hall.
