= Frederik J. Simons =

Belgian geophysicist

- Born: August 5, 1974 (age 52); Antwerp, Belgium
- Education: KU Leuven (BS), (MS); Massachusetts Institute of Technology (PhD)
- Known for: MERMAID, Slepian functions
- Awards: Charles Lagrange Prize, AGU Fellow
- Scientific career
- Fields: Geophysics, Seismology, Geodesy
- Workplaces: Princeton University (2006-present)

Frederik J. Simons is a Flemish Belgian geophysicist. He is a professor at Princeton University in the Department of Geosciences. From 2010 to 2013, Simons was the Dusenbury University Preceptor of Geological & Geophysical Sciences. From 2004 to 2006, he was a lecturer in the Department of Earth Sciences at University College London. Between 2002 and 2004 he was a Harry H. Hess Postdoctoral Fellow in the Department of Geosciences and a Beck Fellow with the Council on Science and Technology, also at Princeton University.

Simons has worked on a variety of theoretical problems in solid-earth geophysics, seismology, geodesy, and geomagnetism.

He has made numerous contributions to the study of Earth's mantle, continental structure and evolution using seismic tomography, the analysis of sea level change in the Last Interglacial and of ice sheet mass variations though the Gravity Recovery and Climate Experiment, and to the theory of spatiospectral localization via prolate spheroidal wave functions.

Simons is involved in the design of mobile marine instrumentation, specifically iterations of MERMAID, for recording earthquakes and other hydroacoustic phenomena.

== Education ==
Frederik Simons was born in Antwerp, Belgium. He graduated primus perpetuus from Our Lady College, Antwerp Jesuit School in 1992. Simons earned his Bachelor's and Master's of Science from KU Leuven in 1996, and his Ph.D. in Geophysics at Massachusetts Institute of Technology (MIT) in 2002.

== Academic career ==
Simons has worked on a variety of theoretical problems in solid-earth geophysics, seismology, geodesy, and geomagnetism. Also involved in the design of instrumentation, he founded the international EarthScope-Oceans consortium, devoted to instrumenting the oceans for global geophysics. A well-known example is the MERMAID (Mobile Earthquake Recording in Marine Areas by Independent Divers) instrument, a passively drifting autonomous mid-column hydrophone. The idea of collecting earthquake data for global tomography by robotic drifters is credited to Guust Nolet, a Princeton Professor of geophysics emeritus, who was Simons' postdoctoral advisor. With their colleagues at the Scripps Institution of Oceanography in San Diego, California, they launched the first MERMAID prototype in 2003. The second-generation MERMAID was built by Teledyne Webb Research with support from the European Research Council. The third-generation MERMAID was developed with Yann Hello and is commercialized by French engineering company OSEAN SAS.

The fourth generation is a dual-use instrument equipped, in addition to the hydrophone package, with a conductivity, temperature, and depth (CTD) sensor capable of carrying out hydrographic profiles down to 4,000 m depth, adding to the Argo fleet.

== Awards ==
- 2026 AGU, Fellow
- 2022 IUGG, Vladimir Keilis-Borok Medal
- 2018 IRIS Consortium/Seismological Society of America, Distinguished Lecturer
- 2012 National Science Foundation, CAREER Award
- 2008 Royal Academy of Science, Letters and Fine Arts of Belgium, Prix quadriennal Charles Lagrange
- 1998 Massachusetts Institute of Technology, Victor J. DeCorte Graduate Fellowship
- 1997 KU Leuven, Biennial prize for an M.Sc. Thesis in geology
- 1996-1997 Belgian American Educational Foundation, Honorary Fellow
- 1996-1997 Fulbright Program, Grantee
- 1996-1997 Rotary Foundation, Ambassadorial Scholar
- 1992 Our Lady College, Antwerp, Primus perpetuus, Antwerpen, Belgium
