= Charles Lagrange Prize =

Belgian mathematical award

Charles Lagrange Prize, or Prix Charles Lagrange, is a monetary prize, recognizing the best mathematical or experimental work contributing to the progress of mathematical knowledge in the world. It was first awarded in 1952 by the Académie Royale de Belgique, Classe des Sciences. Recipients may be Belgian or foreign.

== Recipients ==
The recipients of the Charles Lagrange Prize are:

- 2012: Aida Alvera-Azcárate
- 2008: Frederik J. Simons
- 2000: Viviane Pierrard
- 2000: Louis François
- 1992: Christian Tricot
- 1992: Salim Djenidi
- 1988: Véronique Dehant
- 1984: André Berger
- 1980: Augustinus Nolet
- 1976: Carlo Denis
- 1972: Desmond King-Hele
- 1968: R.O. Vicente
- 1964: Hitoshi Takeuchi
- 1960: Jean Verbaandert
- 1960: Paul Melchior
- 1956: Jean Coulomb
- 1952: Beno Gutenberg
- 1948: Harold Jeffreys
- 1944: Georges Jean Maury
- 1932: William Bowie

== See also ==
- List of mathematics awards
