= Bertha Swirles =

British physicist (1903–99)

- Bertha Swirles in 1962
- Born: 22 May 1903; Northampton, England
- Died: 18 December 1999 (aged 96)
- Education: Girton College, University of Cambridge
- Known for: Relativistic Hartree–Fock
- Spouse: Harold Jeffreys
- Scientific career
- Fields: Quantum physics Mathematics education
- Workplaces: Girton College, University of Cambridge
- Doctoral advisor: Max Born; Ralph Howard Fowler

Bertha Swirles, Lady Jeffreys (22 May 1903 – 18 December 1999) was an English physicist, academic and scientific author who carried out research on quantum theory in its early days. She was associated with Girton College, University of Cambridge, as student and Fellow, for over 70 years.

== Biography ==
Bertha Swirles was born in Northampton in 1903 to Harriett née Blaxley (born around 1873), a primary school teacher, and William Alexander Swirles (b. 1878), a leather salesman. She went to Northampton School for Girls. In 1921, Swirles matriculated at Girton College to read mathematics, taking a first. She became a research student of quantum theory partly under Ralph Fowler at the University of Cambridge, one of a distinguished company of his students that included Paul Dirac and Subrahmanyan Chandrasekhar. She also carried out research at the University of Göttingen under Max Born and Werner Heisenberg.

In 1929, Swirles gained her PhD. By this time, Swirles was an Assistant Lecturer at the University of Manchester. She followed with similar teaching posts at the University of Bristol and then at Imperial College (then the Royal College of Science), London in the 1930s. She returned to Girton College in 1938 as a mathematics lecturer and Fellow of the College. She continued her research into quantum theory, but also expanded her work to include seismology. In 1949 she became Director of Studies for Mathematics at Girton, a position she held until 1969. In this role she supported and developed the teaching of mathematics to women. She held a variety of positions at the College including Vice-Mistress from 1966 to 1969.

In 1940, Swirles married fellow mathematician Harold Jeffreys becoming Lady Jeffreys when he was knighted in 1953.

She enjoyed music and was an accomplished pianist and cellist.

She died in Cambridge on 18 December 1999 of a stroke.

== Recognition ==
She was president of the Mathematical Association for 1969.

She received honorary degrees from the Open University and the University of Saskatchewan.

In 2016 the Council of the University of Cambridge approved the use of Swirles's name to mark Swirles Court, which consists of 325 graduate student rooms, leased by Girton College, within the North West Cambridge Development.

== Bibliography ==
=== Book ===
- Sir Harold Jeffreys and Bertha Swirles (Lady Jeffreys), Methods of Mathematical Physics, third revised edition (Cambridge University Press, 1956 — reprinted 1999). This book, first published in 1946, is commonly referred to as Jeffreys & Jeffreys. ISBN 0-521-66402-0, ISBN 978-0-521-66402-8.

=== Some biographical sketches by Bertha Swirles ===
- Bertha Swirles, John Arthur Gaunt (1904-1944), Notes and Records of the Royal Society of London, Vol. 44, No. 1, pp. 73–79 (1990).
- Bertha Swirles, Reminiscences and Discoveries: Harold Jeffreys from 1891 to 1940, Notes and Records of the Royal Society of London, Vol. 46, No. 2, pp. 301–308 (1992).

== See also ==
- Relativistic quantum chemistry

== Sources ==
Obituaries

- R. M. Williams, Obituary: Bertha Jeffreys, The Independent (London), Wednesday, 22 December 1999.
- Mary Walmsley, Lady Jeffreys 1903-1999, The Mathematical Gazette, Vol. 84, No. 500, pp. 321–323 (2000).
- J. A. Hudson, Lady Bertha Swirles, 1903-1999, Astronomy & Geophysics, Vol. 41, No. 3. 36-37 (2000).

Professional and academic associations
Preceded by William Bourke Wright	Secretary of the Manchester Literary and Philosophical Society; 1937–38	Succeeded by William H. Taylor
