= Harold Jeffreys =

British physicist and mathematician

Sir Harold Jeffreys FRS
- Born: 22 April 1891; Fatfield, County Durham, England
- Died: 18 March 1989 (aged 97); Cambridge, England
- Education: Armstrong College; St John's College, Cambridge
- Known for: Bayesian probability Jeffreys divergence Jeffreys model Jeffreys prior Jeffreys' scale Jeffreys–Lindley paradox WKBJ approximation
- Spouse: Bertha Swirles
- Awards: Smith's Prize (1915); Adams Prize (1926); Gold Medal of the Royal Astronomical Society (1937); Fellow of the Royal Society (1925); Murchison Medal (1939); Royal Medal (1948); William Bowie Medal (1952); Guy Medal (Gold, 1962); Vetlesen Prize (1962); Wollaston Medal (1964)
- Scientific career
- Fields: Mathematics; Geophysics
- Doctoral students: Hermann Bondi; Sydney Goldstein; Vasant Huzurbazar

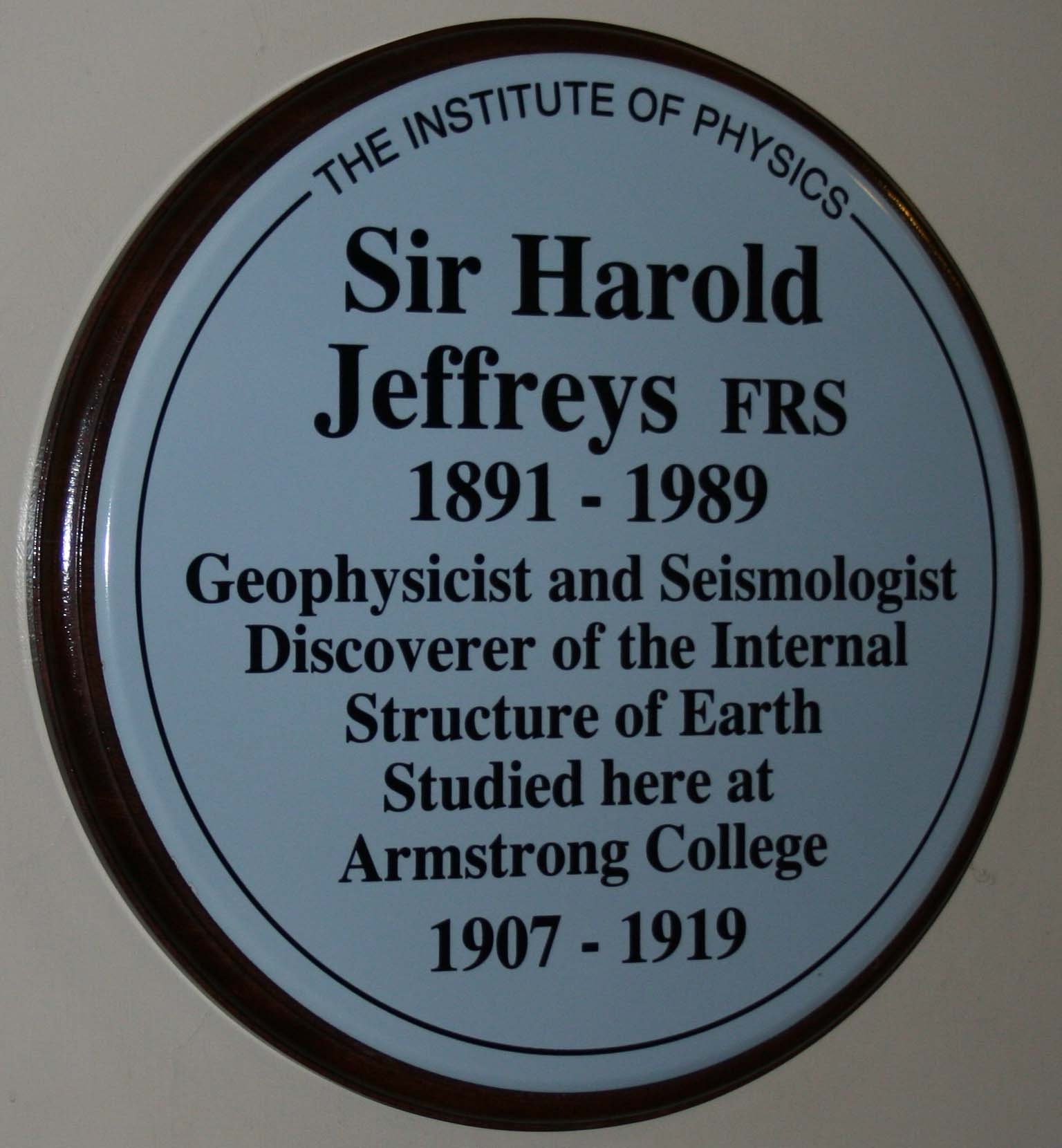
Plaque to Sir Harold Jeffreys, Newcastle University

Sir Harold Jeffreys (22 April 1891 – 18 March 1989) was a British geophysicist who made significant contributions to mathematics and statistics. His book, Theory of Probability, which was first published in 1939, played an important role in the revival of the objective Bayesian view of probability.

== Education ==
Jeffreys was born in Fatfield, County Durham, England, the son of Robert Hal Jeffreys, headmaster of Fatfield Church School, and his wife, Elizabeth Mary Sharpe, a school teacher. He was educated at his father's school and at Rutherford Technical College, then studied at Armstrong College in Newcastle upon Tyne (at that time part of the University of Durham) and with the University of London External Programme.

Jeffreys subsequently won a scholarship to study the Mathematical Tripos at St John's College, Cambridge, where he established a reputation as an excellent student: obtaining first-class marks for his papers in Part One of the Tripos, he was a Wrangler in Part Two, and in 1915 he was awarded the prestigious Smith's Prize.

== Career ==
Jeffreys became a fellow of St John's College in 1914, retaining his fellowship until his death 75 years later. At the University of Cambridge he taught mathematics, then geophysics and finally became the Plumian Professor of Astronomy.

In 6 September 1940, he married fellow mathematician and physicist, Bertha Swirles (1903–1999), and together they wrote Methods of Mathematical Physics.

One of his major contributions was on the Bayesian approach to probability (also see Jeffreys prior), as well as the idea that the Earth's planetary core was liquid.

By 1924 Jeffreys had developed a general method of approximating solutions to linear, second-order differential equations, including the Schrödinger equation. Although the Schrödinger equation was developed two years later, Wentzel, Kramers, and Brillouin were apparently unaware of this earlier work, so Jeffreys is often neglected when credit is given for the WKB approximation.

Jeffreys received the Gold Medal of the Royal Astronomical Society in 1937, the Royal Society's Copley Medal in 1960, and the Royal Statistical Society's Guy Medal in Gold in 1962. In 1948, he received the Charles Lagrange Prize from the Académie royale des Sciences, des Lettres et des Beaux-Arts de Belgique. He was knighted in 1953.

From 1939 to 1952 he was established as Director of the International Seismological Summary further known as International Seismological Centre.

The textbook Probability Theory: The Logic of Science, written by the physicist and probability theorist Edwin T. Jaynes, is dedicated to Jeffreys. The dedication reads, "Dedicated to the memory of Sir Harold Jeffreys, who saw the truth and preserved it."

An appendix to the third edition of Jeffreys' book Scientific Inference explains Mary Cartwright's method of proving that the number π is irrational.

== Opposition to continental drift and plate tectonics ==
Jeffreys, like many of his peers, staunchly opposed the concept of continental drift as put forth by Alfred Wegener and Arthur Holmes. This opposition persisted even into the 1960s among his colleagues at Cambridge. For him, continental drift was "out of the question" because no force even remotely strong enough to move the continents across the Earth's surface was evident. As geological and geophysical evidence for continental drift and plate tectonics mounted in the 1960s and after, to the point where it became the unifying concept of modern geology, Jeffreys remained a stubborn opponent of the theory to his death.

== Honours and awards ==
- Fellow, Royal Society, 1925
- Adams Prize, 1927 (Constitution of the Earth)
- Gold Medal, Royal Astronomical Society, 1937
- Buchan Prize, Royal Meteorological Society, 1929
- Murchison Medal of Geological Society (Great Britain) 1939
- Victoria Medal, Royal Geographical Society, 1941
- Charles Lagrange Prize, Brussels Academy, 1948
- Royal Medal, 1948
- William Bowie Medal, American Geophysical Union, 1952
- Knighted, 1953
- Copley Medal, Royal Society, 1961
- Vetlesen Prize, 1962

== Bibliography ==
- 1924: The Earth, Its Origin, History and Physical Constitution, Cambridge University Press; 5th edn. 1970; 6th edn. 1976
- 1927: Operational Methods in Mathematical Physics, Cambridge University Press via Internet Archive, Review:
- 1929: The Future of the Earth, Norton & Company
- 1931: Scientific Inference, Macmillan Publishers; 2nd edn. 1937; 3rd edn. 1973
- 1931: Cartesian Tensors. Cambridge University Press; 2nd edn. 1961
- 1934: Ocean Waves and Kindred Geophysical Phenomena, with Vaughan Cornish, Cambridge University Press
- 1935: Earthquakes and Mountains, Methuen Publishing; 2nd edn. 1950
- 1939: Theory of Probability, Clarendon Press, Oxford; 2nd edn. 1948; 3rd edn. 1961
- 1946: Methods of Mathematical Physics, with Bertha S. Jeffreys. Cambridge University Press; 2nd edn. 1950; 3rd edn. 1956; corrected 3rd edn. 1966
- 1962: Asymptotic Approximations, Clarendon Press, Oxford
- 1963: Nutation and Forced Motion of the Earth's Pole from the Data of Latitude Observations, Macmillan
- 1971–77: Collected Papers of Sir Harold Jeffreys on Geophysics and Other Sciences, Gordon and Breach
