= The Mermaid (river) =

Tributary of the River Bure in Norfolk, England

Coordinates: 52.7775603°N 1.2156187°E

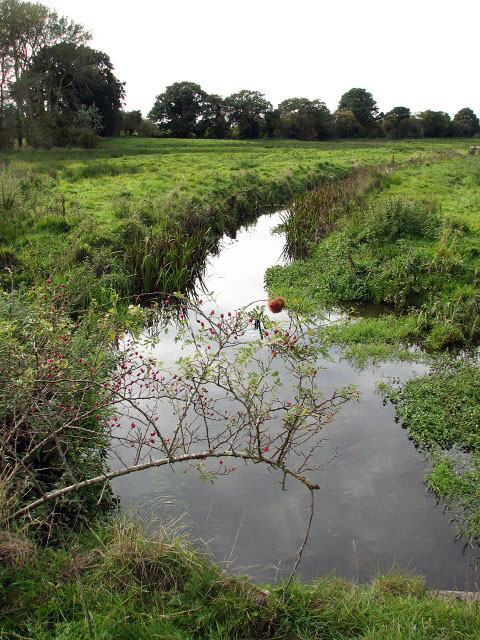
The Mermaid

The Mermaid (river) is a minor tributary of the River Bure in Norfolk, England, and is approximately 6 kilometres (3.7 mi) in length.

== Course ==
The river rises to the southwest of Aylsham close to the village of Cawston. After flowing easterly through two still waters (one known as Stourton Water) the river passes through open farmland. The river flows under the A140 at Marsham and enters the grounds of Bolwick Hall where the river was dammed to form a lake to provide water for Bolwick watermill. Flowing easterly the river passes under the Bure Valley Railway before merging with the River Bure between the villages of Brampton and Burgh-next-Aylsham.

== Ecology ==
The Norfolk Rivers Internal Drainage Board carried out river restoration work in 2017 on a 700 metres (2,300 ft) stretch of the river at Brampton. Improvements including gravel being added to the stream in an attempt to improve wildlife habitats.
