= Marie Koizumi =

Japanese novelist

Marie Koizumi (小泉 まりえ, Koizumi Marie; Japanese pronunciation: [koi.zu͍mi ma.rie] born May 11, 1965) is a Japanese female novelist who currently lives in Tokyo, Japan.

== Works ==
- Love Power (ラブ・パワ, Rabu Pawa) (published in 1999/05)
- Second Boy (セカンド・ボ－イ, Sekando Bōi) (published in 1999/12)
- Secret (ないしょ, Naisho) (published in 2000/07)
- Sad Magic (かなしい魔法, Kanashī Mahō) (published in 1999/09)
- Maria (ま・り・あ) (Co-writer. Illustrated by Naoko Takeuchi)
- Mermaid Panic (Co-writer. Illustrated by Naoko Takeuchi)
- I’m Definitely Gonna Steal Your Boyfriend! (Zettai, Kare wo Ubatte Miseru!) (Co-writer. Illustrated by Naoko Takeuchi)
- Listen to my Selfishness (Atashi no Wagamama wo Kiite) (Co-writer. Illustrated by Naoko Takeuchi)
