= Melicent Wathen =

British diarist (1883–1984)

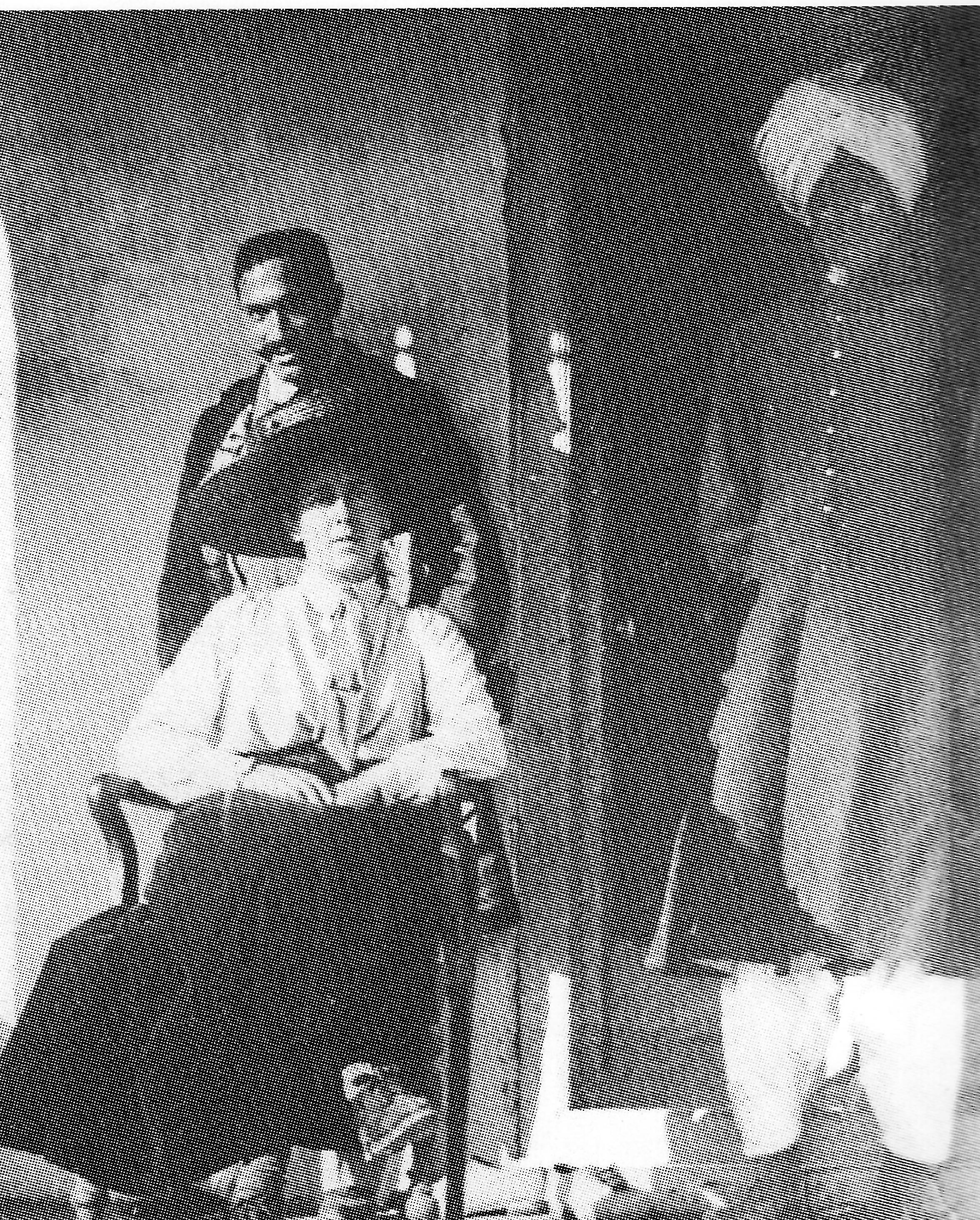
- Born: 19 March 1883
- Died: 4 May 1984 (aged 101)
- Known for: Diarist

Melicent Louis Wathen (née Buxton; 19 March 1883 – 4 May 1984) was a British artist, wife of Gerard Wathen, and diarist, known for her memoirs surrounding the Amritsar massacre of 1919.

In her 1919 diary, she writes about rumours of rebellion, that Reginald Dyer did not act alone, and how her husband helped prevent aerial bombing of Amritsar and the Golden Temple.

== Bibliography ==
- Wagner, Kim A. (2019). Amritsar 1919: An Empire of Fear & the Making of a Massacre. Yale University Press. ISBN 978-0-300-24546-2.
