= Naoko Takeuchi =

Japanese manga artist (born 1967)

- 武内 直子
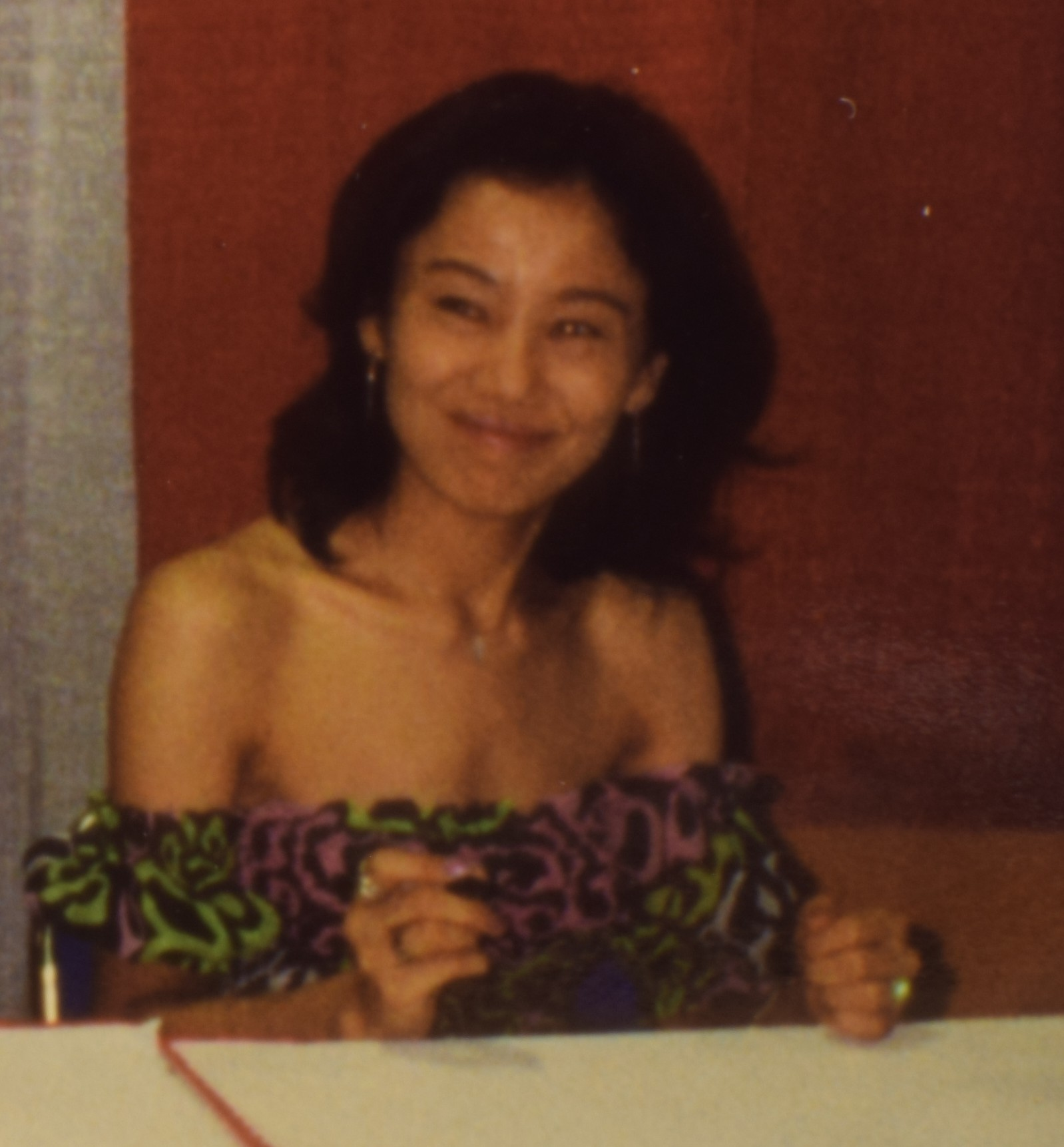
- Takeuchi at the 1998 San Diego Comic-Con
- Born: March 15, 1967 (age 59); Kōfu, Yamanashi, Japan
- Other name: Sumire Shirobara
- Occupation: Manga artist
- Years active: 1986–present
- Notable work: Sailor Moon; Codename: Sailor V
- Spouse: Yoshihiro Togashi (m. 1999)
- Children: 2
- Awards: Kodansha Manga Award (1993)

Naoko Takeuchi (Japanese: 武内 直子, Hepburn: Takeuchi Naoko; born March 15, 1967) is a Japanese manga artist. She is best known as the author of Sailor Moon, one of the most popular manga series of all time. She has won several awards, including the 1993 Kodansha Manga Award for Sailor Moon.

Takeuchi is married to Yoshihiro Togashi, the author of YuYu Hakusho and Hunter × Hunter.

== Early life ==
Takeuchi was born in Kofu, Yamanashi, Japan to Kenji and Ikuko Takeuchi. She has a younger brother, Shingo. She gave the names of her relatives to the characters she created for Sailor Moon, and mentions this in interviews and in several comic strips she produced, in place of author notes.

Takeuchi attended Kofu Ichi High School, where she wore a sailor uniform and joined the astronomy and manga clubs. These experiences influenced her work for Sailor Moon, in addition to her other pieces, such as Love Call and Rain Kiss. Her formative high school experiences influenced her trajectory to become a manga artist. Takeuchi's father encouraged her to pursue other career paths, in case she wouldn't find success as a professional artist, which is why she attended university to study chemistry.

Takeuchi graduated from the Kyoritsu College of Pharmacy, where she received a degree in chemistry and became a licensed pharmacist. Her senior thesis was called "Heightened Effects of Thrombolytic Actions Due to Ultrasound".

== Career ==
=== 1986–1997: Early work and success ===
After graduating from the Kyoritsu College of Pharmacy, at the age of 19, Takeuchi entered the manga industry by submitting her work Love Call to Kodansha; Takeuchi received Nakayoshi's New Artist award for Love Call. She worked steadily on one-shot pieces until writing Maria, which was published in Nakayoshi from early to mid-1990. This work, Takeuchi's first serial comic, was loosely based on Jean Webster's 1912 novel Daddy-Long-Legs and on her friend Marie Koizumi, who helped write it.

After completing Maria, Takeuchi worked on the ice-skating series The Cherry Project, which was serialized in Nakayoshi from late 1990 to 1991. While working on The Cherry Project, Takeuchi wanted to do a manga on outer space and girl fighters. Her editor, Fumio Osano, asked her to put the fighters in sailor suits. This concept would later become a one-shot called Codename: Sailor V, which would later begin serialization in RunRun. When Toei Animation planned to adapt her manga into an anime series, she reworked Sailor V and added four other superheroines.

In December 1991, Nakayoshi began serializing Sailor Moon, which became an instant hit. The success encouraged Takeuchi to work on both Sailor Moon and Sailor V from 1991 to 1997. However, RunRun was canceled with the November 1997 issue, and the planned Sailor V anime adaptation was canceled along with it. During that six-year period, she produced 60 chapters, which were collected in 18 volumes. The success of the manga led to a 200-episode anime adaptation, three animated films, numerous video games, and wide-ranging merchandising.

She had an interview with Silent Möbius creator, Kia Asamiya.

At the series' end, Takeuchi worked on PQ Angels for Nakayoshi. This gained a fair amount of popularity, but was canceled due to Kodansha losing seven pages of her manuscript. Takeuchi said that Toei Animation had the manuscript, therefore it would have been possible to create an anime adaptation of the series.

Takeuchi's own studio is called "Princess Naoko Planning" (PNP). Takeuchi established PNP to manage her properties, mainly Sailor Moon. The studio later encompassed Yoshihiro Togashi's work as well and appeared in the credits for such anime as Level E and Hunter × Hunter. Its name also appears on the musical credits for Shin Kaguya Shima Densetsu and other projects.

=== 1998–2009 ===
Following the loss of seven pages of Takeuchi's PQ Angels manuscript, Osano departed Kodansha and the plans for the Materials Collection were canceled. Takeuchi departed Kodansha for Shueisha.

On August 13, 1998, Takeuchi made her first appearance in the United States at San Diego Comic-Con for three days. That same year, she published the first Sailor Moon artbook since her departure from Kodansha, Sailor Moon Infinity Collection Art Book with limited releases.

While working on her short comic strip Princess Naoko Takeuchi Back-to-Work Punch!!, Takeuchi met Yoshihiro Togashi at a Weekly Shōnen Jump meeting hosted by Kazushi Hagiwara, and had a meeting arranged between them by voice actress Megumi Ogata. She collaborated with Togashi as an assistant (doing screentone) and as a manager on volume 1 of Hunter × Hunter. However, the work and the demands proved more than she had expected, and as a result, Takeuchi left Shueisha.

Around this time, Takeuchi conceived the idea for a one-shot called Toki☆Meka, which eventually turned into Toki☆Meca. Togashi had a similar idea at the same time as her, but never fully brought it to fruition. He helped somewhat with Toki☆Meka at this point in developing the idea by drawing some concept sketches, which Takeuchi showed in Toki☆Meca volume 1.

Togashi and Takeuchi married in 1999. From this marriage, the couple have two children: a son, born in January 2001, and a daughter, born in 2009.

After Kodansha's rights to Sailor Moon expired, Takeuchi returned to the publisher in 1999 to develop and publish the Materials Collection. She also began serializing Love Witch, but it was cancelled. Takeuchi started to work on the reprints of Sailor Moon and Sailor V, and published Toki☆Meca in Nakayoshi.

In 2003, Takeuchi became heavily involved in producing Pretty Guardian Sailor Moon, a tokusatsu television series based on Sailor Moon, as she had an interest in learning more about the anime industry. This culminated in the creation of Pretty Guardian Sailor Moon. The series displays a plot that is heavily reliant on the manga and also explores many themes that the manga was unable to explore. She showed up at the official conference with a fist up, meaning "good luck", in Act Zero.

After the production of Pretty Guardian Sailor Moon ended in 2004, Takeuchi continued to work on Toki☆Meca. During the manga's serialization, Osano returned as her editor. Takeuchi also worked more closely with managing PNP and gave talks to college students. At the same time, she wrote a children's book titled Oboo-nu- to Chiboo-nu- as a birthday present to her son. (Togashi provided illustrations for the book; Takeuchi made mention of this in the back of the first volume of Toki☆Meca.) She still works on the website, updating it about once a month with new flash animations or profiles.

=== 2010–2019 ===
In 2012, it was announced that a new Sailor Moon anime adaptation was in development. With it, Takeuchi started a Kanzenban version of the manga, which was announced by Osano, and will include fixed past mistakes and new covers for the manga. Color pages are also included for the title pages. There was also an artbook announced, and she has been working on merchandise, which was announced by Osano on his Twitter feed.

The new reboot anime, Pretty Guardian Sailor Moon Crystal, debuted in July 2014. It streamed on Niconico bi-weekly, and ended in July 2015, spanning a total of 26 episodes, which cover the Dark Kingdom and Black Moon arc of the manga. Takeuchi wrote the ending theme song, "Moonbow" (月虹, Gekkō), under her penname, "Sumire Shirobara" (白薔薇sumire, Shirobara Sumire). The series eventually gained its 13-episode third season, Pretty Guardian Sailor Moon Crystal Season III, covering the Infinity arc of the manga (known as Death Busters in Japan), and aired weekly on Japanese television from April to June 2016.

=== 2020–present ===
In 2020, the two volumes of official "All Colored Eternal Edition" (オールカラー完全版, Ōrukarā Kanzenban) of the Sailor Moon manga was released on June 29, with Takeuchi providing new illustrations for both covers.

In 2021, Takeuchi chief supervised the production of the two-part anime film, Pretty Guardian Sailor Moon Eternal The Movie, which adapted the Dream arc of the manga (known as Dead Moon in Japan), and acted as a "fourth season" for the Sailor Moon Crystal series. Both films were released in 2021 in Japanese theaters, with the first film on January 8, and the second film on February 11. Takeuchi also provided the lyrics for the theme song, "Moon Color Chainon" (月色Chainon, Tsukiiro Chainon), under the name of "Sumire Shirobara".

In 2022, Takeuchi chief supervised the production of the sequel to Sailor Moon Eternal, titled Pretty Guardian Sailor Moon Cosmos The Movie. The two-part film covered the Stars arc of the manga (known as Shadow Galactica in Japan), and acted as a "fifth and final season" for the Sailor Moon Crystal series. Both films were released in June 2023, with the first film on the 9th, and the second film on the 30th.

== Works ==
=== Manga ===
Work	Years	Summary
Chocolate Christmas (チョコレート·クリスマス, Chokorēto Kurisumasu)	1987–1988	A story about a girl who falls in love with a DJ over Christmas. It appeared collected into a single tankōbon volume.
Maria (ま·り·あ, Ma-ri-a)	1989–1990	A story, co-written with her friend, Marie Koizumi, loosely based on the book Daddy-Long-Legs by Jean Webster. She released a pocket edition of the book in 1994.
The Cherry Project (Theチェリー・プロジェクト, Za Cherī Purojekuto)	1990–1991	A figure-skating-themed manga, involving the young skater Cherry's quests to become a professional skater and win the heart of a boy. The series was released by Kodansha in three collected volumes between 1991 and 1992. One of its characters, Haruna Sakurada, also appears in Sailor Moon.
Codename: Sailor V (コードネームはセーラーV, Kōdonēmu wa Sērā Bui)	1991–1997	This series follows the adventures of costumed "magical girl" Sailor V. It directly preceded (and became something of a prototype for) Pretty Soldier Sailor Moon, introducing Minako Aino, alias "Sailor V", who would become a significant character in the latter series. Initially starting as a one-shot in 1991, Takeuchi would later make Sailor V a serialized manga series that ran concurrently with Sailor Moon. Takeuchi concluded the series after she had already finished Sailor Moon; Sailor V featured an ending that tied the two series together. Originally released in three volumes, Codename: Sailor V was re-released in 2004 in a deluxe, two-volume "Renewal Edition" (新装版 shinzōban) format. In 2014, Codename: Sailor V was published in a two-volume "Eternal Edition" (完全版 kanzenban).
Pretty Soldier Sailor Moon, later known as Pretty Guardian Sailor Moon (美少女戦士セーラームーン, Bishōjo Senshi Sērā Mūn)	1991–1997	Known to international audiences simply as Sailor Moon, this manga became Naoko Takeuchi's most famous work and spawned two anime, several films, stage musicals, a live-action television series, and video games of various genres. A fusion of styles between the mahō shōjo and sentai genres, Sailor Moon tells the story of Usagi Tsukino, a girl who one day discovers her identity as the reincarnation of a celestial heroine who fights for love and justice. This series was largely responsible for the late-1990s resurgence of "magical girl" anime and manga. The series was originally released in eighteen volumes, but was re-released in 2003 and 2004 in a deluxe, twelve-volume "Renewal Edition" (新装版 shinzōban) format, with two supplementary volumes containing side stories to the main work. In 2013, the chapters were once again re-released in ten "Eternal Edition" (完全版 kanzenban) volumes to commemorate the manga's twentieth anniversary, which includes digitally remastered artwork, new covers and color artwork from its Nakayoshi run. Characters from her previous work, Codename Sailor V, return in this one.
Miss Rain (ミス・レイン, Misu Rein)	1993	A collection of five short manga, including the title work.
Prism Time (プリズムタイム, Purizumu Taimu)	1996–1997	A collection of one-shot stories, from early works to those from the late 1990s. It is available in two volumes, released in 1995 and 1997, respectively.
PQ Angels (PQエンジェルス, PQ Enjerusu)	1997	Features two alien girls with the ability to turn into cockroaches, who are searching for their princess. The series was a complete disaster for Takeuchi: it was discontinued abruptly after only four chapters, and Kodansha lost the proofs of the portion that had been written. It has therefore only appeared in its original serialization, from September to December 1997.
Princess Naoko Takeuchi's Return-to-Society Punch!!	1998–2004	A collection of short strips, detailing what Takeuchi did after Sailor Moon. It ran for a number of years under a changing title, giving details about her post-Sailor Moon slump and recovery, as well as her meeting, marrying, and starting a family with fellow manga creator Yoshihiro Togashi. The comic ran in Shueisha's Young You, rather than a Kodansha publication, and has not been collected since its original serialization. There are similar "____ Punch!" comic strips in the same format at the end of some of the Sailor Moon "Renewal Edition" volumes.
Toki☆Meka! (とき☆メカ!, Toki☆Meka!)	2001	A one-shot story about a robot (Mecha), her creator, and their adventures.
Love Witch (ラブ・ウィッチ, Rabu Witchi)	2002	A story where a girl receives a perfume bottle and becomes a witch, but with a heavy price. It ran in Nakayoshi from April to June 2002, with a side story, "Sister Witch", in September 2002. It was discontinued after three chapters with no explanation. It has yet to be reprinted in any sort of compilation.
Toki☆Meca! (とき☆めか!, Toki☆Meca!)	2005–2006	A serialized version of the original one-shot, which began after the completion of the Sailor Moon and Sailor V re-releases. The first portion ran from the January to April 2005 issues of Nakayoshi, after which the author went on hiatus, promising that she would return to the series later. The second phase of the series started in November 2005. One collected volume, released in August 2005, has been published thus far. The serialization officially ended in May 2006. This makes Toki☆Meca! the first series that Takeuchi has completed since Sailor Moon and Codename: Sailor V.

=== Anime ===
==== Sailor Moon (1990s series) ====
Year	Title	Format	Credit	Notes
1992-93	Sailor Moon	Anime television series	Original Creator (based on her manga Sailor Moon)	Adapted Dark Kingdom arc 46 episodes
1993-94	Sailor Moon R	Anime television series	Original Creator (based on her manga Sailor Moon)	Adapted Black Moon arc 43 episodes
1993	Sailor Moon R: The Movie	Anime film	Original Creator (based on her manga Sailor Moon)	—N/a
1994-95	Sailor Moon S	Anime television series	Original Creator (based on her manga Sailor Moon)	Adapted Infinity arc 38 episodes
1994	Sailor Moon S: The Movie	Anime film	Original Creator (based on her manga Sailor Moon)	Adapted Princess Kaguya's Lover side story
1995-96	Sailor Moon SuperS	Anime television series	Original Creator (based on her manga Sailor Moon)	Adapted Dream arc 39 episodes
1995	Sailor Moon SuperS: The Movie	Anime film	Original Creator (based on her manga Sailor Moon)	—N/a
1996-97	Sailor Moon Sailor Stars	Anime television series	Original Creator (based on her manga Sailor Moon)	Adapted Stars arc 34 episodes

==== Sailor Moon Crystal (2014 reboot series) ====
Year	Title	Format	Credit	Note
2014	Pretty Guardian Sailor Moon Crystal Season I	Original net animation	Original Work (based on her manga Sailor Moon)	Adapted Dark Kingdom arc 14 episodes
2015	Pretty Guardian Sailor Moon Crystal Season II	Original net animation	Original Work (based on her manga Sailor Moon)	Adapted Black Moon arc 12 episodes
2016	Pretty Guardian Sailor Moon Crystal Season III	Anime television series	Original Work (based on her manga Sailor Moon)	Adapted Infinity arc 13 episodes
2021	Pretty Guardian Sailor Moon Eternal The Movie	Two-part anime film	Original Work (based on her manga Sailor Moon), Chief Supervisor	Adapted Dream arc
2023	Pretty Guardian Sailor Moon Cosmos The Movie	Two-part anime film	Original Work (based on her manga Sailor Moon), Chief Supervisor	Adapted Stars arc

=== Illustrations ===
- Maria (ま·り·あ, Ma-ri-a) (novelization of Takeuchi's manga, with prose by Marie Koizumi), 1994
- Mermaid Panic (マーメイド・ぱにっく) Volumes 1–4 (written by Marie Koizumi), 1996–1997
- Atashi no Wagamama wo Kiite... (あたしのわがままを聞いて...) (written by Marie Koizumi), 1998
- Zettai, Kare w Ubatte Miseru! (絶対、彼を奪ってみせる!) (written by Marie Koizumi), 1998

=== Written books ===
- Oboo-nu- to Chiboo-nu- (illustrated by Yoshihiro Togashi)
  - A children's book written for her son's birthday.

=== Song lyrics ===
Takeuchi wrote the lyrics for a number of songs featured in the Sailor Moon anime and live-action series. Though mainly character-based image songs, they include a few theme songs. These include:

- Ai wo Shinjiteru ("Believe in Love") – image song for Sailor Moon
- Chikara wo Awasete ("Combining Power") – image song for Kō Taiki/Sailor Star Maker
- Futtemo Haretemo -come rain or come shine- ("Whether It Rains or Shines -Come Rain or Come Shine-") – image song for Usagi Tsukino (Pretty Guardian Sailor Moon Crystal) (under the name of "Sumire Shirobara")
- Gekkō ("Moonbow") – ending theme of the first two seasons of Pretty Guardian Sailor Moon Crystal (under the name of "Sumire Shirobara")
- Ginga Ichi Mibun Chigai na Kataomoi ("Unrequited Love a Station Apart in the Galaxy") – image song for Kō Seiya/Sailor Star Fighter
- Honoo no Sogekimono ("Flame Sniper") – image song for Sailor Mars
- Initial U – image song for Sailor Uranus
- Katagoshi ni Kinsei ("Venus Over My Shoulder") – image song for Sailor Venus (Pretty Guardian Sailor Moon)
- Kirari*SailorDream! ("Sparkling Sailor Dream!") – theme song of Pretty Guardian Sailor Moon
- Luna! – image song for Luna
- Maboroshi no Ginzuisho ("Illusionary Silver Crystal") – insert song for the first season of Sailor Moon
- Mayonaka Hitori ("Alone at Midnight") – image song for Kō Yaten/Sailor Star Healer
- Moon Color Chainon – theme song of Pretty Guardian Sailor Moon Eternal The Movie (under the name of "Sumire Shirobara")
- Nagareboshi He ("To the Shooting Star") - In-Universe song performed by the Sailor Starlights (Sailor Moon Sailor Stars and Pretty Guardian Sailor Moon Cosmos The Movie)
- Over Rainbow Tour – image song for Sailor Moon (Pretty Guardian Sailor Moon)
- Princess Moon – second ending theme of the first season of Sailor Moon
- "Rashiku" Ikimasho ("I'll Be As I Am") – second ending theme of Sailor Moon SuperS and Pretty Guardian Sailor Moon Eternal The Movie
- Route Venus – image song for Sailor Venus (Sailor Moon R)
- Sailor Star Song – opening theme song of Sailor Moon Sailor Stars and second opening song of Pretty Guardian Sailor Moon Cosmos The Movie
- Sērā Team no Theme ("Sailor Team's Theme") - insert song for Sailor Moon SuperS
- Senshi no Omoi ("Feelings of a Soldier") – image song for Sailor Neptune
- Todokanu Omoi ("My Friend's Love") – song for Three Lights (a.k.a. Sailor Starlights)
- We Believe You – image song for Sailor Jupiter

== Awards ==
Takeuchi has won several awards, including the 2nd Nakayoshi Comic Prize for Newcomers for Yume ja Nai no Ne in 1985. She also won for "Love Call", which won Nakayoshi's New Artist award which debuted in the Nakayoshi Deluxe September 1986 issue. In 1993 she won the 17th Kodansha Manga Award for shōjo for Sailor Moon.
