= The Mermaid Inn (disambiguation) =

The Mermaid Inn is a historical inn located in Rye, East Sussex, England.

The Mermaid Inn may also refer to:

- Mermaid Tavern, an historic tavern in London
- An historic building in Welshpool, Wales
- The Mermaid Inn on the Morridge in Staffordshire, England
- The Mermaid Inn seafood restaurant in Manhattan, New York City

== See also ==
- Mermaid House Hotel
- Mytton and Mermaid Hotel
