= Gerard Anstruther Wathen =

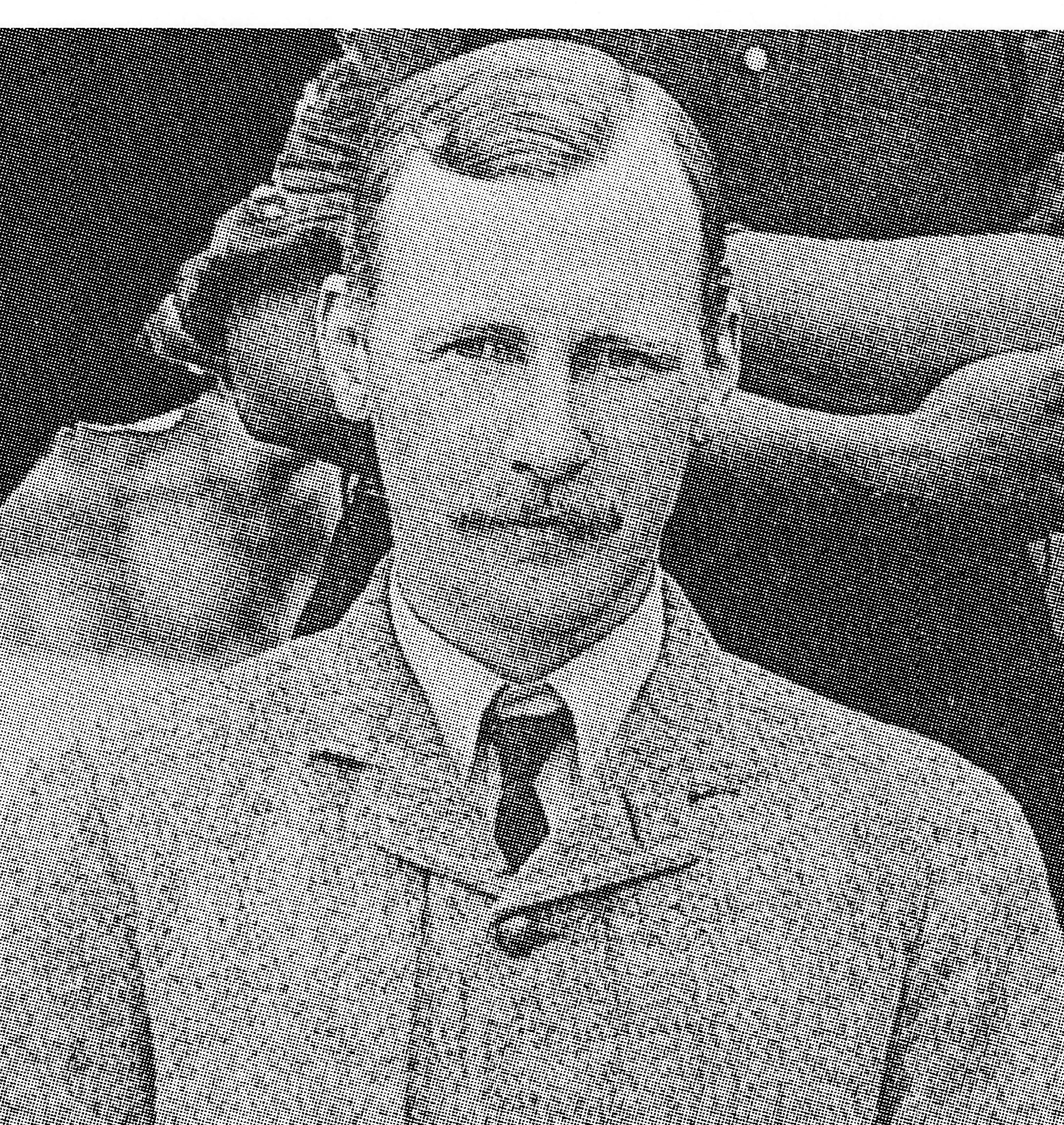
- Born: 28 December 1878
- Died: 9 August 1958 (aged 79)
- Spouse: Melicent Wathen

Academic background
- Education: St Paul's School; Peterhouse, Cambridge

Gerard Anstruther Wathen CIE (28 December 1878 – 9 August 1958) joined the Indian Education Service in 1905 and became professor of education and Principal of the Khalsa College, Amritsar.

== Early life and education ==
Gerard Anstruther Wathen was born on 28 December 1878, in Bexley, Kent, the youngest child of William Hulbert Wathen. He completed his early education from St Paul's School in 1898 and subsequently gained admission to Peterhouse, Cambridge to study the classics. Between 1899 and 1902, after a period of study at Bonn and Paris, he completed paleographic and archeological research in the Balkans and Anatolia. He received his Bachelors degree in 1902 and Masters in 1905.

== Career ==
From 1903 to 1905 Wathen was assistant master at Tonbridge School. That year he left to join the Indian Education Service and take up a post at the Central Model School, Lahore, as headmaster. He then taught at Government College, Lahore, later becoming professor there.

Wathen moved to India with his wife Melicent in 1909. Prior to the First World War, his social circle included Malcolm Lyall Darling and E. M. Forster, who in 1912 delivered a talk to Wathen's class at Government College. He then became inspector of schools, and in 1915 was appointed Principal of Khalsa College, Amritsar, with 700 students. There, he established the 'Coats-off Society', that encouraged students to take time out to perform manual labour.

== Amritsar 1919 ==
After the First World War, Wathen re-visited England with his wife and children, and upon return to India in early 1919, found his students preoccupied with politics and the then recent Rowlett Act. According to historian Kim Wagner, Wathen’s dealings with Khalsa College's students were unusually progressive for the period and frowned upon by some Anglo-Indians. Wagner further argues in Amritsar 1919 that Wathen’s actions between 10 April and 12 April 1919 helped prevent "the idea of bombing Amritsar" by air. He was not called to testify before the Hunter Commission, the official inquiry following the Jallianwalla Bagh Massacre, and in Wagner's words "was more or less written out of the official history of the events of April 1919".

Historian Nigel Collett notes that five years after the Punjab disturbances, Wathen was the only Englishman ready to defend C. Sankaran Nair at the O'Dwyer v. Nair Libel Case (1924), held in London, by which time he had moved back to England. Wagner notes that almost 16 years later in 1940, following the death of Michael O'Dwyer, Wathen reflected on 1919 and wrote to The Times concluding his letter with "He was right and I was wrong". The letter read;

It fell to me to be the first to tell Sir Michael O'Dwyer of the shooting in the Jalliwala Bagh. I reached Government House at Lahore from Amritsar at 3 am that night and urged Sir Michael to go at once to Amritsar and replace in the hands of the civil authorities the power being vested then under martial law in the hands of General Dyer. I told him that I feared intense bitterness among the Sikhs and probably a rising. He took a different view, said that the shooting, however horrible, would mean an end of rioting, and besides, he added, I always trust the man upon the spot.

== Later career ==
From 1924 to 1955, Wathen served the Hall School, Hampstead, as its headmaster. There, he established financial aid to boys who arrived as refugees from German-occupied Europe.

== Death and legacy ==
Wathen died on 9 August 1958, after being hit by a taxi on 24 July that year. Khalsa College awards the Prof GA Wathen Scholarship. The Wathen Society is named for him. Wathen believed that the character of Cyril Fielding in E. M. Forster's A Passage to India was modelled on him, though according to Indian historian V. N. Datta, it was Malcolm Lyall Darling that Forster was referring to.

== Bibliography ==
- Brunner, Michael Philipp (2022). Education and Modernity in Colonial Punjab: Khalsa College, the Sikh Tradition and the Webs of Knowledge, 1880-1947. Switzerland: Springer. ISBN 978-3-030-53514-8.
- Collett, Nigel (2022). Developing the Heart: E.M. Forster and India. City University of HK Press. ISBN 978-962-937-590-4.
- Wagner, Kim A. (2019). Amritsar 1919: An Empire of Fear & the Making of a Massacre. Yale University Press. ISBN 978-0-300-24546-2.
