= Mermaid (dinghy) =

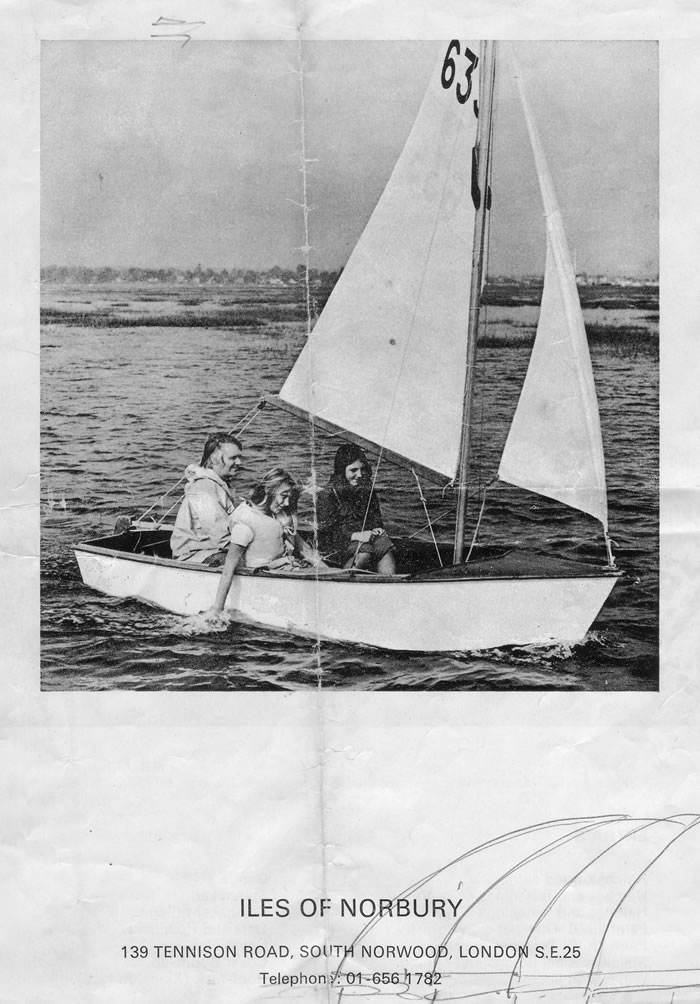
- Hancock & family sailing a Mark III Mermaid

Boat
- Crew: 2–3

Hull
- Hull weight: 115 lb (52 kg)
- LOA: 11 ft (3.4 m)
- Beam: 4 ft 7 in (1.40 m)

Sails
- Upwind sail area: 70 sq ft (6.5 m^{2})

Racing
- D-PN: 127 (MK I)

The Do-it-yourself Mermaid is an 11-foot (3.4m) plywood sailing dinghy designed by Roger Hancock in 1962. Usually built at home, it is suitable for a crew of two or three. It can be sailed, rowed or motored and can be trailed or car-topped. The boat is gunter rigged, with one size of jib. A spinnaker is used for racing.

== Design ==
The DIY Mermaid broke away from the post-war tradition of building the hulls of plywood dinghies upside-down on frames fixed to the floor of a shed or garage, for the duration of the hull-construction process. The innovation consisted of building the stem to stern seating surfaces of the boat flat on the floor in such rooms as the kitchen, the spare bedroom or the garage during the minimum amount of time needed for the glue to set, for example, overnight. This allowed people living in quite small houses to build a boat at home for the first time.

The spine of the boat is an extended centreboard case running from stem to stern, which gives enormous strength to the hull structure. The gunter rig design allows the spars to be easily stored inside the boat and kept under a flat cover when not in use.

== History ==
The DIY Mermaid was designed as an entry for the sailboat-building competition, organised by Stanley Tools in 1961, and the first DIY Mermaid was built by the designer on the living room floor. The Do-it-yourself magazine started serialising the construction drawings and instructions in June 1963, whereby the DIY Mermaid could be built over several months, free of royalties and the cost of plans. For more rapid building, full sets of drawings and instructions were available. All the sails were supplied initially by Rockall and later by Arun. In 1966, Do-it-yourself magazine described the DIY Mermaid as "probably the only small general purpose dinghy designed specifically to be built by the amateur without the need or expense of a factory-produced kit of wooden parts".

As the Do-it-yourself magazine was widely distributed throughout the English-speaking world (the former British Empire or Colonies), a number of DIY Mermaids were probably built in many different countries and fitted out with locally produced sails and fittings.

Competition for choice of which small boat to build became very intense during this period of dinghy development. Consequently, in order to respond to new public demand and the new construction techniques, a stitch-and-glue version, very much lighter in weight, with a V-bottom hull, was produced as the DIY Mermaid MK II. Subsequently, a MK III version was also developed which had no rear tank, but with extended side tanks to the transom and a shortened centreboard case.

Altogether, some 1000 DIY Mermaids were built between 1962 and 1975. A Mermaid Class Association was established in 1963 and regional representatives were appointed with the aim of stimulating competition and further interest in the dinghy. Although the original design became an RYA recognised Class in 1965, with a Portsmouth Yardstick number for racing, insufficient numbers and the widespread geographical ownership resulted in Class racing gradually diminishing over the years. Another significant factor at that time was the emergence of a similar sized wooden dinghy, originally sponsored by the Daily Mirror. The evolution of these innovative class designs was the subject of a paper produced in 2005/6 for Industry and Innovation.

One enduring success from the creation of the DIY Mermaid was the Maidenhead Sailing Club, which was originally formed from a fleet of DIY Mermaid dinghies and to this day, the club emblem is still that of a Mermaid.

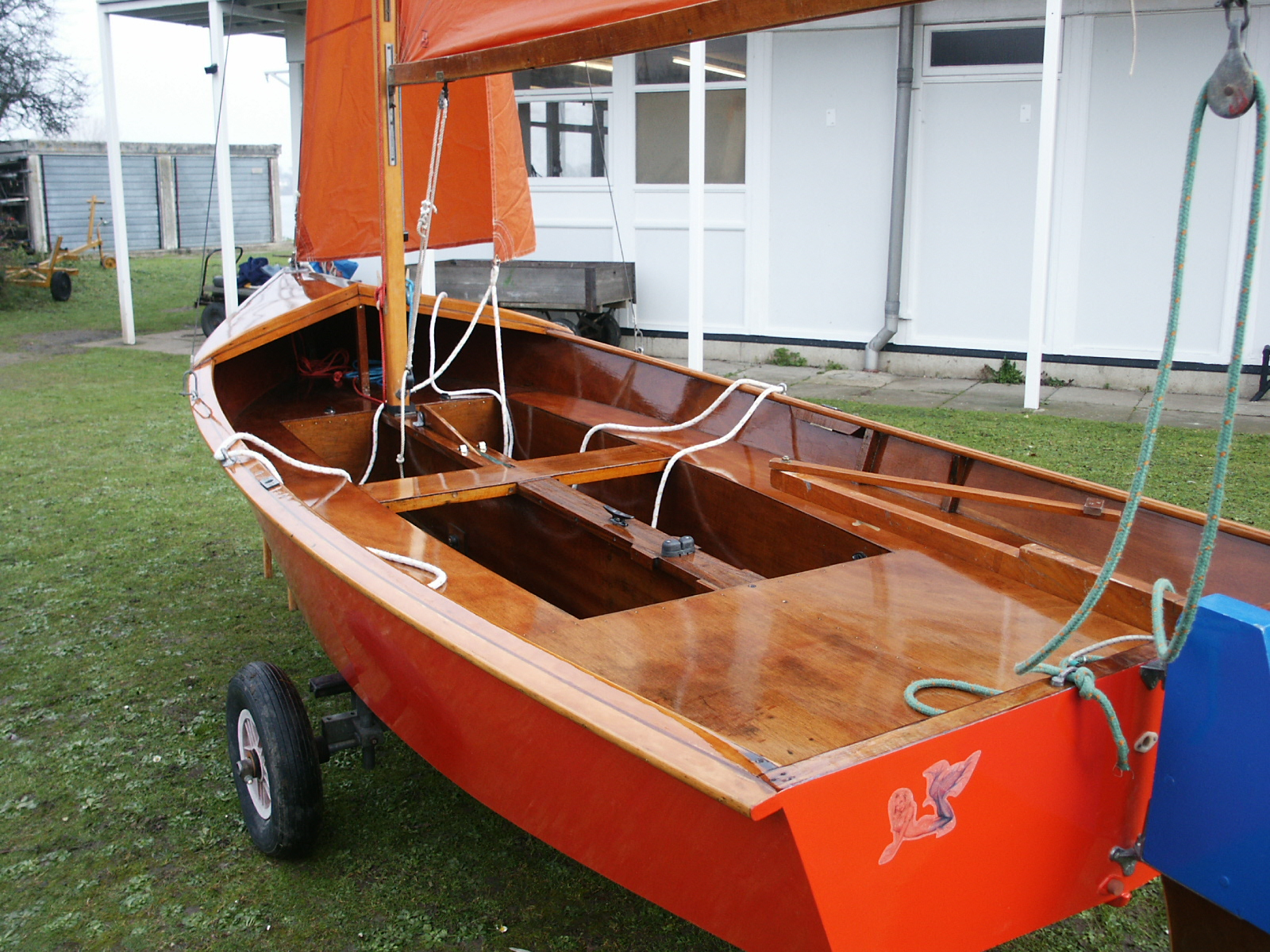
Restored MK I, sail number 137

== Registry ==
Work is in progress to re-create a register of existing Mermaids.
