= Mermaid (Lichtenstein) =

Sculpture by Roy Lichtenstein

- Artist: Roy Lichtenstein
- Year: 1979
- Medium: Concrete, steel, polyurethane, enamel, palm tree, and water
- Movement: Pop art
- Dimensions: 640 cm × 730 cm × 330 cm (252 in × 288 in × 132 in)
- Location: Fillmore Miami Beach at Jackie Gleason Theater; Miami Beach; 25.792524°N 80.132736°W

Mermaid (sometimes The Mermaid) is a 1979 outdoor sculpture by Roy Lichtenstein, composed of concrete, steel, polyurethane, enamel, palm tree, and water. It is located in Miami Beach at the Fillmore Miami Beach at Jackie Gleason Theater. Measuring 640 cm × 730 cm × 330 cm (252 in × 288 in × 132 in), it is his first public art commission according to some sources, although others point to a temporary pavilion that predates this work. It is also the second piece of public art in the city of Miami Beach. Since the sculpture was installed, it has been restored several times, and the theater that it accompanies has been restored and renamed twice.

== Location ==
The statue rests outside what was originally called the Miami Beach Auditorium and later named the Miami Beach Theater of the Performing Arts or Theater of the Performing Arts, Miami. In 1987, the building was renamed the Jackie Gleason Theater of the Performing Arts. The institution was renamed in 2007 to the Fillmore Miami Beach at Jackie Gleason Theater.

== Detail ==
1979 to 1982 was a period in which Lichtenstein created large-scale sculptures as derivatives of earlier smaller works. However, The Mermaid, which was his first large-scale sculpture, was uniquely created for this commission. He was commissioned to produce Mermaid in 1979 for the Theater of the Performing Arts. The original $100,000 commission included a $50,000 National Endowment for the Arts grant and dollar for dollar matching by art aficionados. It is the second public art piece in the city of Miami Beach. Although Lichtenstein produced a mural for Expo '67 in Montreal, this was his first public art commission according to some sources. Other sources claim that his New York State Pavilion mural at the Worlds Fair was commissioned.

Like almost all 20 of his sculptures produced up to 1980, this "...began as a line drawing, in elevation; proceeded to full-scale blacktape layout; and then to a magna-painted, handcrafted wooden maquette, which established the mold for the casting...in bronze by lost-wax process." Several stages of development (sketches, drawings, collages and maquettes) are readily available on the Lichtenstein Foundation website. The reclining mermaid rests atop whitecapped blue waves adjacent to a palm tree. In contrast to the otherwise serene tropical setting, Licthenstein includes grey steel clouds. His commentary on this work located in Miami Beach is to emphasize the "absurdity of creating sculptures from such painterly forms." Subsequent works expanded on "painterly sculpture".

The work continued his 1970s sculptural theme of depicting ephemeral events in physical form with the inclusion of rays of sunlight upon the Mermaid's body. At the time, large-scale public art was something new to Lichtenstein. The work was regarded as an extension of his painting into public form rather than as an attempt to produce sculptural artwork. Incorporating a palm tree and a water-filled pool, Mermaid is regarded as "dazzlingly silly and provocative".

== History ==
The statue has been touched up on several occasions by city employees in its first 15 years of existence to deal with fading paint and the impact of hurricane forces. According to a Bluffton University website, the sculpture was restored in 2000 and rededicated in 2001. In 2010, an additional restoration included "cleaning, corrosion removal and stabilization of its ferrous metal elements, compounding of the painted surfaces, concrete repair, and partial repainting". Other elements of the repair include the replacement of lost concrete and protective cooling.

== See also ==
- 1979 in art
