= The Little Mermaid (1968 film) =

Rusalochka
- Original Russian poster
- Directed by: Ivan Aksenchuk
- Written by: Alexander Galich; Hans Christian Andersen (book)
- Based on: "The Little Mermaid" by Hans Christian Andersen
- Starring: Nina Gulyayeva
- Cinematography: Mikhail Druyan
- Music by: Aleksandr Lokshin
- Distributed by: Soyuzmultfilm
- Release date: June 19, 1968
- Running time: 29 min
- Country: Soviet Union
- Language: Russian

The Little Mermaid (Russian: Русалочка, romanized: Rusalochka) is a 1968 Soviet animated film based on Hans Christian Andersen's 1837 fairy tale "The Little Mermaid". The film was adapted in English in 1993 by Films by Jove for the series Animated Classic Showcase.

== Plot ==
As the story opens, a busful of tourists are touring Copenhagen. Their guide draws their attention to the beautiful statue at Langelinie. At that, the film's focus moves below the waterline, where a fish, mocking the human's idea that love can be real, tells the story that follows to several smaller fish.

A galleon is foundering on the rough ocean. Its master, a young prince, is trying his best to keep the ship out of harm, but he fails, and eventually falls into the waves. Meanwhile, four mermaid princesses come from a magnificent alabaster underwater palace. The three older mermaids, clad in blue, give their younger sister a red cloak, indirectly indicating the protagonist.

The little mermaid heads toward the surface and sees the now-unconscious prince in the water. She carries him to the shore, where she sings a sweet mermaid song for him. Then a bell tolls from a nearby convent and several women come out. The little mermaid jumps into the sea, waiting to see what becomes of the prince. One of the ladies, very physically similar to the mermaid, finds the prince and helps him to the convent.

The little mermaid returns to her palace and tells her sisters of the prince. She decides to go to the hag of the sea for a solution. The hag offers her a potion that will turn her human, with the condition of having to lose her voice and bear a pain in her feet whilst walking. This the little mermaid quickly accepts.

The little mermaid arrives on land, where she is met by the prince astride a horse. He sees her beauty, and she dreams of a fantasy world riding with him on a winged horse into the stars. The couple then are seen on a voyage on a ship to a nearby land. A servant from the nearby palace's balcony spots the ship and calls for the princess. The prince and the little mermaid enter the palace, observed by the courtiers. The king welcomes the couple and presents his daughter, who is none other than the girl from the convent. The little mermaid falls into despair, remembering how the hag had told her that if the prince married another, she (the mermaid) would die the very next sunrise.

The prince and princess, clad in wedding clothes, head back to the ship with the little mermaid holding the bride's train and an entourage following them. As the little mermaid awaits the next day in desperation, her three sisters appear, now sporting short hair, having traded their long tresses, riches, and castle to the hag in exchange for enough magic to assist their younger sister. They give her a magic shell, which will kill the prince and his new beloved, save her life, and return her to her mermaid shape. The little mermaid refuses and drops the shell into the sea. A huge wave then comes to the ship, killing her for love. The prince notices her absence, but as she dies, her last song is sung, and he says to his bride "So you remembered the song after all."

Two different interpretations are offered in the end. The fish bemoans the mermaid's fate and foolishness and says it is a cautionary tale of how everyone should know their place. The human sees it as a most beautiful but tragic love story.

== Cast ==
- Nina Gulyayeva as The Little Mermaid
  - Viktoriya Ivanova as singing voice of The Little Mermaid.
- Lidiya Korolyova as the fish guide
- Roza Makagonova as the princess who saved the prince
- Anatoli Papanov as the human tour guide
- Vladimir Troshin as the prince
- Yuliya Yulskaya as the sea witch

== See also ==
- List of films about witchcraft
