= Rosie Mac =

British-Spanish actress and model (born 1997)

- Born: Rosie Nelson; 12 February 1997 (age 29); England
- Occupation: Actress
- Children: 1
Rosie Mac
- Genres: Rock, heavy metal
- Instrument: Vocals
- Member of: Halocene

Rosie Mac (born 12 February 1997) is a British-born actress, model and singer from Andalusia, Spain. She was the body double for Emilia Clarke in her portrayal of Daenerys Targaryen in season five of the HBO series Game of Thrones.

== Career ==
In 2015, Mac was the body double for Emilia Clarke on Game of Thrones during the show's fifth season.

In 2016, Mac played the lead role in the live action film Little Mermaid.

As of June 2016, Mac co-founded and owns the Mac Model & Casting Agency.

In May 2026, Mac performed with Halocene to produce their cover of Bad Omens's song Death of Peace of Mind.

On July 2026, Mac was announced as the new vocalist for Halocene, following original vocalist Addie Nicole's (also known as Addisyn) departure from the band on 7 August 2026.

== Filmography and Discography ==
=== Film ===
Year	Film	Role	Notes
2013	Alice. Under the table	Alice	Short Film
2013	Española Chica	Rosie	Music Video
2016	Little Mermaid	Little Mermaid	

=== TV Series ===
Year	Series	Role	Notes
2015	Game of Thrones	Daenerys Targaryen	Body Double
2020	’’Little Mix: The Search’’	Herself	Contestant

=== Music ===
Year	Band	Title	Album	Notes
2026	Halocene	Bad Omens - Death of Peace of Mind by Halocene	Upcoming	Guest vocalist
