= MERMAID =

Marine scientific instrument platform

MERMAID is a marine scientific instrument platform, short for Mobile Earthquake Recorder for Marine Areas by Independent Divers.

MERMAID evolved from a first prototype, developed and built by Scripps Institution of Oceanography in partnership with Princeton University, to a second, built by Teledyne Webb Research in collaboration with the University of Nice Sophia Antipolis, and now third-generation model, operational today, commercialized by OSEAN SAS in Le Pradet, France. Fourth-generation models add hydrographic monitoring capability to complement the acoustic sensor suite, and are designed to carry out measurement profiles to depths exceeding 4,000 m.

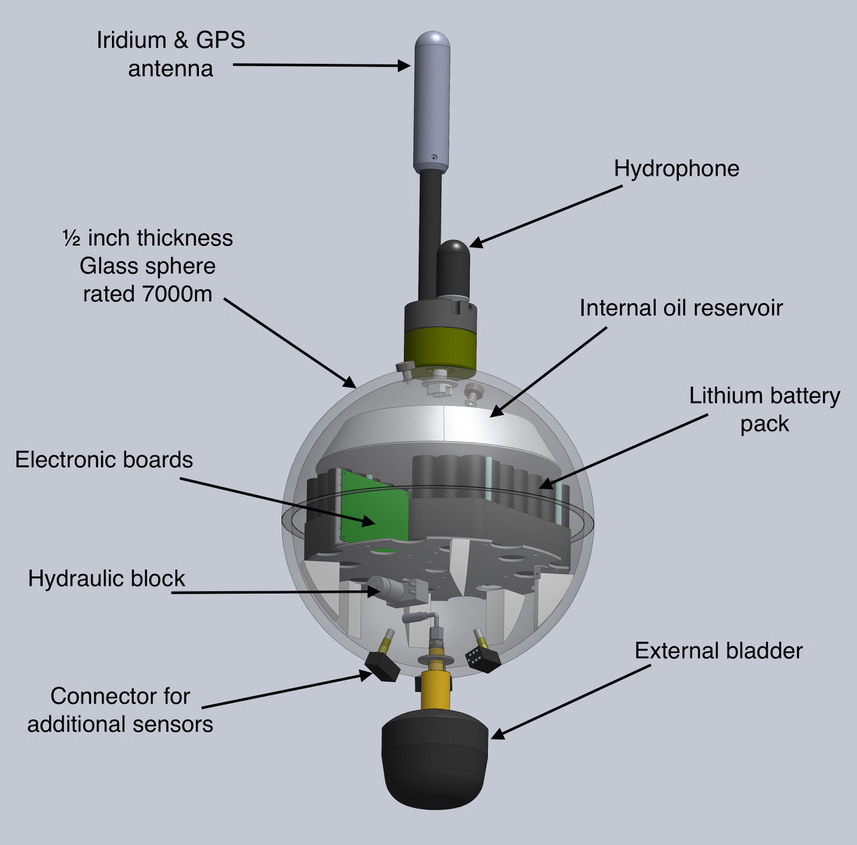
Technical diagram of a third-generation MERMAID instrument

MERMAID is a freely-drifting float equipped with a hydrophone to collect hydroacoustic data for the study of earthquakes worldwide. Typically floating at a parking depth of 1500 m, the instrument uses a buoyancy engine (a hydraulic oil bladder system) to return to the surface for triggered data transmission (on average every 6–7 days) via the Iridium satellite constellation, to respond to on-demand data requests, and to receive mission parameter updates. MERMAID carries lithium-ion batteries, sufficient to power about 250 descend/ascend cycles, which translates to an instrument autonomy of about 5 years. A pressure sensor monitors descent depth, and a GPS receiver provides location and time corrections during the brief intervals that MERMAID surfaces (on average less than one hour).

Fourth-generation models are multidisciplinary and carry a conductivity-temperature-depth sensor to collect hydrographic profiles of ocean temperature and salinity (similar to those from the Argo program) during their voyages. They can be additionally equipped with high-frequency hydrophones for the study of, e.g. cetacean (whale) vocalizations, and other sensors.

== Scientific objectives and capabilities ==
Imaging Earth's interior via the technique of seismic tomography is reliant on dense source-receiver distribution, or data coverage, but two thirds of the Earth's surface are covered by water. Increasing station density in the oceanic domain is an objective widely shared in the global seismological research community. After the first detections of teleseismic events by first-generation MERMAID, relatively small-scale deployments of second-generation MERMAID instruments in the Mediterranean, the Indian Ocean, and in the Pacific around the Galápagos, demonstrated MERMAID's potential for closing the oceanic seismic coverage gap, both for global and regional seismic events, and for seismic tomography of the Earth's mantle.

The ongoing multinational experiment SPPIM (South Pacific Plume Imaging and Modeling), coordinated by Ifremer with JAMSTEC, deployed an array of fifty-one third-generation instruments to image, in detail, the massive mantle plume in the lower mantle beneath the South Pacific. The instruments are owned by Southern University of Science and Technology, Princeton University, JAMSTEC and Géoazur, and the data management and distribution is handled by EarthScope-Oceans.

The standard third-generation model reports pressure time-series, waveforms triggered by earthquakes, whereas the third-generation model deployed in the Mediterranean was configured to report time-resolved hydroacoustic spectral densities.

== Deployments and network configuration ==
MERMAIDs first-generation model (2003-2005) retired after gathering about 120 hours of acoustic pressure data from a depth of around 700 m offshore from La Jolla, California.

Of the second-generation MERMAIDs (2012-2016), the first were deployed in the Mediterranean and recovered after 10, respectively 18 months of autonomous operations. Other deployments followed in the Indian Ocean, and in the Pacific around Galápagos, where an array of nine MERMAIDs remained operational for about two years.

Sixty-seven third-generation MERMAIDs (2018-now) were launched in the Pacific Ocean, the South China Sea, and the Mediterranean, from a variety of international (French, Japanese, Chinese) research vessels.

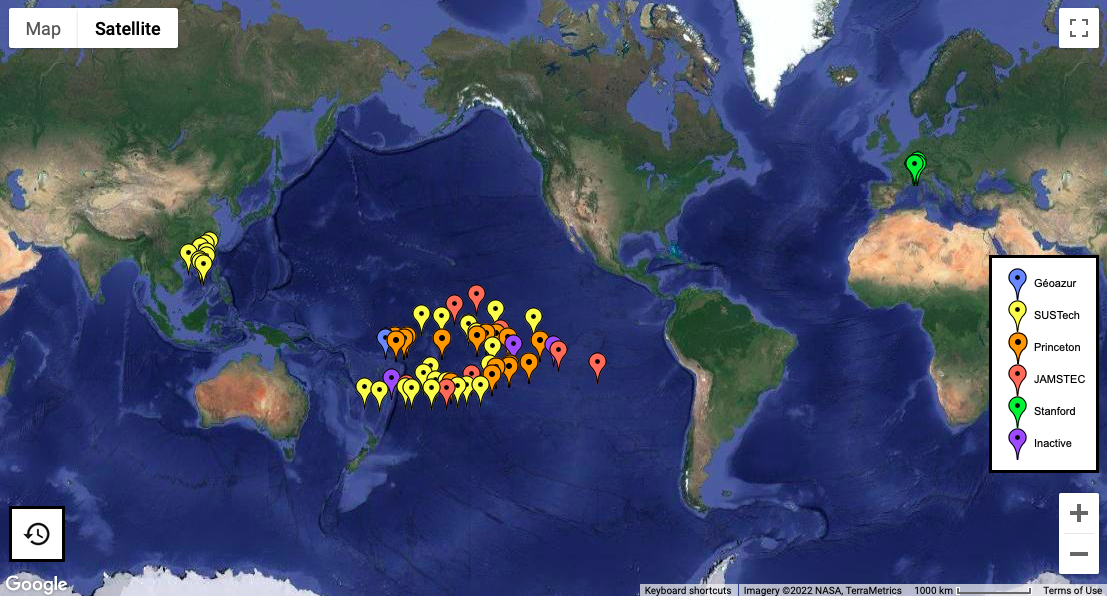
EarthScope-Oceans MERMAID array configuration as of January 15th, 2022

== Data collection and distribution ==
Every MERMAID instrumental sensor has a unique identifier. In contrast to conventional (land-based) seismometers or ocean-bottom seismometers (OBS), MERMAID instruments are passively adrift with the ocean currents: they do not remain at any fixed geographic location. Data from particular units are location-tagged hydroacoustic time-series as recorded at depth in the oceans. Data segments triggering transmission mostly contain pressure-wave signals from particular earthquakes worldwide, but also noise generated by a variety of sources (e.g. microseisms or volcanic eruptions). Since GPS signals do not penetrate under water, the actual location of recording specific events is derived from interpolation in post-processing.

Seismic data from the US and French MERMAIDs are being deposited with the IRIS Consortium. Primary seismoacoustic arrivals from distant teleseismic earthquakes are prioritized for automatic reporting, although the complete records (and the year-long buffer, which can be queried remotely) contain multiple other types of seismic arrivals. Seismic waveforms are released to the public through the IRIS Data Management Center, after a rolling embargo period of typically two years.

Trajectory metadata are released by EarthScope-Oceans in near real-time. Float trajectories allow for the reconstruction of ocean currents, and are used in educational and outreach programs, e.g. using the free iOS app Adopt-A-Float.

== The EarthScope-Oceans Consortium ==
EarthScope-Oceans is an international academic consortium that collects seismic data using robotic mobile—drifting—diving platforms (profiling floats) in the world's oceans, and distributes them to scientific user communities, with the objective to plug the oceanic data coverage gap in earthquake detection. MERMAID is EarthScope-Oceans' chief instrument platform.

EarthScope-Oceans
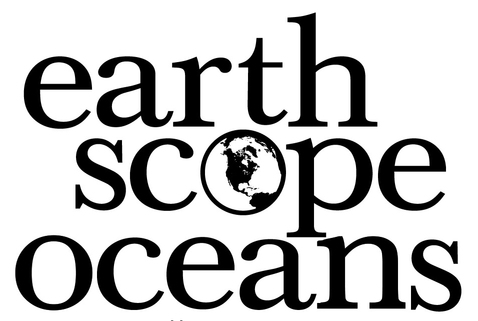
- Founded: December 2015; 10 years ago
- Services: Research, Education
- Website: www.earthscopeoceans.org

Funded in part by the US National Science Foundation (NSF), EarthScope-Oceans is not affiliated with NSF's EarthScope program. EarthScope is a trademark of the IRIS Consortium.

EarthScope-Oceans is one of 361 Decade Actions endorsed by the Intergovernmental Oceanographic Commission of UNESCO, part of the Ocean Observing Co-Design program, falling under the umbrella of the United Nations Decade of Ocean Science for Sustainable Development (2021-2030).

The expansion of the EarthScope-Oceans fleet to include new multidisciplinary MERMAID models adds oceanography, meteorology, climate science, and bioacoustics to the seismological domain of interest of the EarthScope-Oceans Consortium.

EarthScope-Oceans is a member organization of the International Federation of Digital Seismograph Networks. Its network code is MH, and its doi 10.7914/SN/MH. EarthScope-Oceans is a member of the Marine Technology Society.
