= Die Seejungfrau =

Orchestral fantasy by Alexander von Zemlinsky

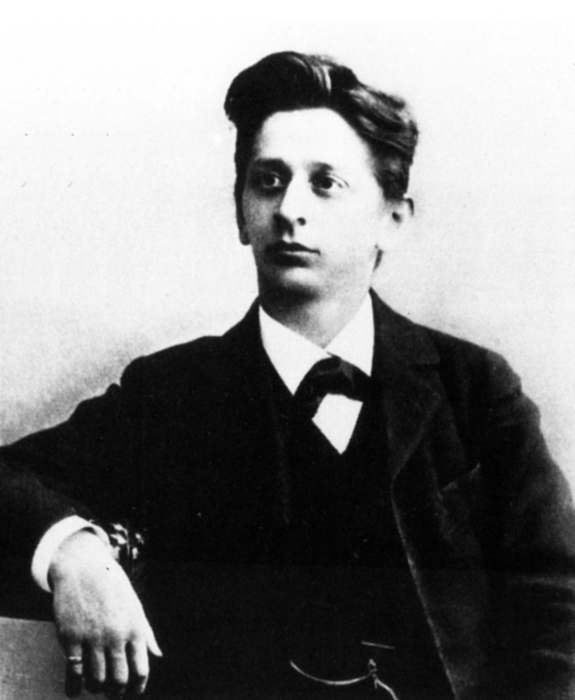
Zemlinsky c. 1900

Die Seejungfrau (The Mermaid) is a fantasy for large orchestra in three movements by Austrian composer Alexander von Zemlinsky, based on the folk-tale "The Little Mermaid" by Hans Christian Andersen.

== Background ==
In April 1901 Zemlinsky began a romantic liaison with his pupil Alma Schindler, but Alma broke off the relationship that November after meeting Gustav Mahler, whom she would go on to marry four months later. Die Seejungfrau was, in part, an expression of the heartbreak and sense of rejection that Zemlinsky felt as a result. The work was begun in February 1902, with the orchestration completed in March 1903.

The work was first performed on 25 January 1905 at the Musikverein in Vienna with the Wiener Konzertverein Orchester conducted by the composer in a concert that also included the premiere of Arnold Schoenberg's Pelleas und Melisande. The critical response was largely favourable. Further performances followed in Berlin in December 1906, conducted by Walter Meyrowitz, and in Prague in November 1907, conducted by Artur Bodanzky.

=== Withdrawal and rediscovery ===
Some time after the Prague performance, Zemlinsky withdrew the work. Later, he gave the score of the first movement to his friend, Marie Pappenheim, as a gift. The second and third movements he took with him to New York after fleeing Austria in 1938. These were eventually deposited, along with the rest of Zemlinsky's manuscripts, with the Library of Congress in Washington, D.C.

For many years after the composer's death, the score of Die Seejungfrau was presumed lost or destroyed. The second and third movements were assumed by Zemlinsky's widow Louise to be the surviving fragments of a symphony in E-flat major. In the early 1980s, two British Ph.D. students, Keith J. Rooke and Alfred Clayton, working separately, compared the items in Vienna and Washington and established that they belonged together. The first modern performance of the work was given by the Austrian Youth Orchestra conducted by Peter Gülke in 1984. Since then, the work has become one of Zemlinsky's most frequently performed and several recordings have appeared. A critical edition of the score, edited by Zemlinsky scholar Antony Beaumont, was published by Universal Edition in 2013. This includes a passage of 88 bars in the second movement, depicting the Mermaid's visit to the Mer-witch, which Zemlinsky expunged from the score before the première.

== Instrumentation ==
Woodwinds
4 flutes (third and fourth doubling piccolo)
2 oboes
cor anglais
2 clarinets in B♭/A
E♭ clarinet
bass clarinet
3 bassoons

Brass
6 French horns
3 trumpets
4 trombones
tuba

Percussion
timpani
cymbals
triangle
glockenspiel
2 tubular bells

Strings
2 harps
violins
violas
cellos
basses

== Structure ==
The work consists of three movements:

1. Sehr mäßig bewegt
2. Sehr bewegt, rauschend
3. Sehr gedehnt, mit schmerzvollem Ausdruck

The total playing time is around 47 minutes for the critical edition.

== Recordings ==
=== Based on the critical edition (2013) ===
Year	Conductor	Orchestra	Label	I.	II.	III.	Total	Ref
2015	John Storgårds	Helsinki Philharmonic Orchestra	Ondine	15:48	17:16	14:41	47:45	
2016	Emmanuel Krivine	Luxembourg Philharmonic Orchestra	Alpha	15:26	17:38	13:04	46:06	
2020	Marc Albrecht	Netherlands Philharmonic Orchestra	Pentatone	15:56	17:06	14:26	47:28	

=== Older recordings ===
Year	Conductor	Orchestra	Label	I.	II.	III.	Total	Ref
1986	Riccardo Chailly	Berlin Radio Symphony Orchestra	Decca	15:19	12:17	12:30	40:06	
1997	Thomas Dausgaard	Danish National Symphony Orchestra	Chandos	15:37	13:42	13:33	43:02	
2003	Antony Beaumont	Czech Philharmonic Orchestra	Chandos	14:26	11:56	12:36	38:58	
2005	Thomas Dausgaard	Danish National Symphony Orchestra	Dacapo	14:26	12:32	13:08	40:06	
2006	James Judd	New Zealand Symphony Orchestra	Naxos	15:30	11:54	13:27	40:49	
2010	Leon Botstein	American Symphony Orchestra	ASO	16:48	13:43	16:30	47:01	
2010	Cornelius Meister	ORF Radio-Symphonieorchester Wien	CPO	17:05	13:36	14:35	45:16	
