= Sailor Moon =

Japanese manga series by Naoko Takeuchi

- Cover of the first tankōbon volume of Sailor Moon, featuring the titular character

美少女戦士セーラームーン (Bishōjo Senshi Sērā Mūn)
- Genre: Magical girl
- Manga
- Written by: Naoko Takeuchi
- Published by: Kodansha
- English publisher: AUS: Penguin Books Australia; NA: Tokyopop (former); Kodansha Comics; UK: Turnaround Publisher Services
- Magazine: Nakayoshi
- English magazine: NA: MixxZine, Smile
- Original run: December 28, 1991 – February 3, 1997
- Volumes: 18
- Anime television series
- Sailor Moon (1992–1997); Sailor Moon Crystal (2014–2016)
- Films
- Sailor Moon R: The Movie (1993); Sailor Moon S: The Movie (1994); Sailor Moon SuperS: The Movie (1995); Sailor Moon Eternal (2021); Sailor Moon Cosmos (2023)
- Other media
- Codename: Sailor V (1991–1997); Pretty Guardian Sailor Moon (live action, 2003); Sound dramas; Collectible card game; Musicals; Soundtracks; Video games
- icon

Sailor Moon (Japanese: 美少女戦士セーラームーン, Hepburn: Bishōjo Senshi Sērā Mūn; originally translated as Pretty Soldier Sailor Moon, later Pretty Guardian Sailor Moon) is a Japanese manga series written and illustrated by Naoko Takeuchi. It was originally serialized in Kodansha's shōjo manga magazine Nakayoshi from 1991 to 1997; the 60 individual chapters (later reorganized into 52) and several side stories were compiled into 18 tankōbon volumes. Set in Tokyo in the 1990s, the series follows the adventures of a schoolgirl named Usagi Tsukino as she transforms into the eponymous character to search for a magical artifact, the "Legendary Silver Crystal" (「幻の銀水晶」, Maboroshi no Ginsuishō; lit. "Phantom Silver Crystal"). She leads a group of comrades, the Sailor Soldiers, called Sailor Guardians in later editions, as they battle against villains to prevent the theft of the Silver Crystal and the destruction of the Solar System.

The manga was written in conjunction with the airing of an anime series produced by Toei Animation, which was broadcast in Japan from 1992 to 1997. Toei also developed three animated feature films, a television special, and three short films based on the anime. A live-action television adaptation, Pretty Guardian Sailor Moon, aired from 2003 to 2004, and a second anime series, Sailor Moon Crystal, began simulcasting in 2014. The manga series was licensed for an English release by Kodansha Comics in North America, and in Australia and New Zealand by Random House Australia. The entire anime series has been licensed by Viz Media for an English-language release in North America and by Madman Entertainment in Australia and New Zealand.

Since its release, Sailor Moon has received critical acclaim, with praise for its art, characterization, and humor. The manga has sold over 46 million copies worldwide, making it one of the best-selling manga series, as well as one of the best-selling shōjo manga series of all time, marking its importance in the history of manga. Additionally, the television series played a major role in popularizing anime in the Western world, particularly in the United States. The Sailor Moon franchise has generated over $2.5 billion in worldwide merchandise sales.

== Overview ==
The series focuses on Usagi Tsukino, a young middle school student in the Azabu-Jūban district of Tokyo in the 1990s, who learns from the talking cat Luna that she is actually a reincarnation of a princess from the Moon Kingdom, Sailor Moon. She is joined by Ami Mizuno, a student who awakens as Sailor Mercury; Rei Hino, a local Shinto shrine maiden who awakens as Sailor Mars; Makoto Kino, a tall and strong transfer student who awakens as Sailor Jupiter; and Minako Aino, a young aspiring idol who had awakened as Sailor Venus a few months earlier, accompanied by her talking feline companion Artemis. As they set out on their adventures, others join the Guardians later in the series, including Mamoru Chiba, a high school student who occasionally assists them as Tuxedo Mask; Chibiusa, Usagi and Mamoru's future daughter who awakens as Sailor Chibi Moon; Haruka Tenoh, a car-racer who can transform into Sailor Uranus; Michiru Kaioh, a violinist who can transform into Sailor Neptune; Setsuna Meioh, a physics student who can transform into Sailor Pluto; Hotaru Tomoe, who awakens as Sailor Saturn; and the Three Lights, pop idols who are really the Sailor Starlights. Together, they encounter extraterrestrials, space travelers, and other Guardians as they protect the Earth and the Moon from destruction by malevolent forces.

== Production ==
=== Concept and creation ===
Naoko Takeuchi, after working on the 1991 Nami Akimoto manga Miracle Girls, redeveloped Sailor Moon from her manga one-shot Codename: Sailor V, which was published on August 8, 1991, and featured Sailor Venus as the main protagonist. Takeuchi wanted to create a story with a theme about girls in outer space. While discussing with her editor, Fumio Osano, he suggested the addition of Sailor fuku. When Codename: Sailor V was proposed for adaptation into an anime by Toei Animation, Takeuchi redeveloped the concept so Sailor Venus became a member of a team. The resulting manga series became a fusion of the popular magical girl genre and the Super Sentai series, of which Takeuchi was a fan. Recurring motifs include astronomy, astrology, gemology, Greco-Roman mythology, Japanese elemental themes, teenage fashion trends, and schoolgirl antics. Codename: Sailor V would continue to run parallel to Sailor Moon as a serial, now recontextualized as an origin story for Sailor Venus.

Takeuchi said discussions with Kodansha originally envisaged a single story arc; the storyline was developed in meetings a year before serialization began. After completing the arc, Toei and Kodansha asked Takeuchi to continue the series. She wrote four more story arcs, which were often published simultaneously with the five corresponding seasons of the anime adaptation. The anime ran one or two months behind the manga. As a result, the anime follows the storyline of the manga fairly closely, although there are deviations. Takeuchi later said because Toei's production staff was mostly male, she felt the anime had "a slight male perspective".

Takeuchi later said that she planned to kill off the protagonists, but Osano rejected the notion and said, "[Sailor Moon] is a shōjo manga!" When the anime adaptation was produced, the protagonists were killed in the final battle with the Dark Kingdom, although they were revived. Takeuchi resented that she was unable to do that in her version. Takeuchi also intended for the Sailor Moon anime adaptation to last for one season, but due to its immense popularity, Toei asked Takeuchi to continue the series. At first, she struggled to develop another storyline to extend the series. While discussing with Osano, he suggested the inclusion of Usagi's daughter from the future, Chibiusa.

=== Westernization ===
When the Sailor Moon anime was first released in North America and dubbed in English in 1995, fans and academics alike noted that the dub had westernized the series by altering or removing Japanese names and cultural references. These included, but were not limited to, Sailor Moon's real name, Usagi Tsukino, being changed to Serena, and the name of Mamoru Chiba, Usagi's love interest, being changed to Darien Shields. The original main theme was changed from a romance ballad discussing Serena's (Usagi's) eternal love for Darien (Mamoru) to an anthem focused on Serena's newfound identity as the superheroine Sailor Moon. The nature of Serena and Darien's relationship – a minor who is romantically involved with an adult – was interestingly unchanged from the Japanese anime, although attempts were made to obscure the age difference in the Western adaptations.

Other examples of westernization referenced by Sailor Moon's audience included flipping scenes of traffic to have cars drive on the right side of the road, along with the English dub changing any conversations between characters that contained lesser-known Japanese cultural references, removing violent scenes, reducing visible nudity. The North American, Italian, and Latin American adaptations altered LGBT+ characters, such as depicting the lesbian couple of Amara (Haruka) and Michelle (Michiru) as cousins, creating problematic subtexts that do not exist in the original work, changing the gay couple of Zoisite and Malachite (Kunzite) into a heterosexual couple by making Zoisite a woman, and converting the antagonist Fisheye from biological male with female gender representation who shows interest in males to a female character.

According to Bandai America, the company in charge of Sailor Moon merchandise in the Western Hemisphere, the approach to advertising Sailor Moon was to make the show and superheroine "'culturally appropriate' for the American market".

== Media ==
=== Manga ===
Written and illustrated by Naoko Takeuchi, Sailor Moon was serialized by Kodansha in the shōjo manga anthology Nakayoshi from December 28, 1991, to February 3, 1997. The side-stories were serialized simultaneously in RunRun—another of Kodansha's manga magazines. The 52 individual chapters were published in 18 tankōbon volumes by Kodansha from July 6, 1992, to April 4, 1997. In 2003, the chapters were re-released in a collection of 12 shinsōban volumes to coincide with the release of the live-action series. The manga was retitled Pretty Guardian Sailor Moon and included new cover art, and revised dialogue and illustrations. The ten individual short stories were also released in two volumes. In 2013, the chapters were once again re-released in 10 kanzenban volumes to commemorate the manga's 20th anniversary, which includes digitally remastered artwork, new covers, and color artwork from its Nakayoshi run. The books were enlarged from the typical Japanese manga size to A5. The short stories were republished in two volumes, with the order of the stories shuffled. Codename: Sailor V was also included in the third edition.

The Sailor Moon manga was initially licensed for an English release by Mixx (later Tokyopop) in North America. The manga was first published as a serial in MixxZine beginning in 1997, but was later removed from the magazine and made into a separate, low print monthly comic to finish the first, second, and third arcs. At the same time, the fourth and fifth arcs were printed in a secondary magazine, Smile. Pages from the Tokyopop version of the manga ran daily in the Japanimation Station, a service accessible to users of America Online. The series was later collected into a three-part graphic novel series spanning eighteen volumes, which were published from December 1, 1998, to September 18, 2001. In May 2005, Tokyopop's license to the Sailor Moon manga expired, and its edition went out of print.

In 2011, Kodansha Comics announced that the company had acquired the license for the Sailor Moon manga and its lead-in series, Codename: Sailor V, in English. They published the twelve volumes of Sailor Moon simultaneously with the two-volume edition of Codename: Sailor V from September 2011 to July 2013. The first of the two related short story volumes was published on September 10, 2013; the second was published on November 26, 2013. At Anime Expo 2017, Kodansha Comics announced plans to re-release Sailor Moon in an "Eternal Edition", featuring a new English translation, new cover artwork by Takeuchi, and color pages from the manga's original run, printed on extra-large premium paper. The first Eternal Edition volume was published on September 11, 2018; the tenth and final volume was published on October 20, 2020. On July 1, 2019, Kondasha Comics began releasing the Eternal Editions digitally, following an announcement the day before about the series being released digitally in ten different languages. In November 2020, Kodansha Comics announced plans to re-release the Sailor Moon manga again as part of their "Naoko Takeuchi Collection". The company described the new edition as a "more affordable, portable" version of the Eternal Edition. The first volume was published on April 5, 2022, and the last on September 17, 2024.

Sailor Moon has also been licensed in other English-speaking countries. In the United Kingdom, the volumes are distributed by Turnaround Publisher Services. In Australia, the manga is distributed by Penguin Books Australia.

The manga has been licensed in Russia as well as the CIS for distribution by publishing company XL Media. The first volume was released in 2018.

=== Anime series & films ===
No.	Title	Episodes	Originally aired / Release date		Director
No.	Title	Episodes	First aired	Last aired	Director
Sailor Moon
1	Sailor Moon	46	March 7, 1992	February 27, 1993	Junichi Sato
2	Sailor Moon R	43	March 6, 1993	March 12, 1994	Kunihiko Ikuhara, Junichi Sato (#1−13)
Film	Sailor Moon R: The Movie		December 5, 1993		Kunihiko Ikuhara
3	Sailor Moon S	38	March 19, 1994	February 25, 1995	Kunihiko Ikuhara
Film	Sailor Moon S: The Movie		December 4, 1994		Hiroki Shibata
4	Sailor Moon SuperS	39	March 4, 1995	March 2, 1996	Kunihiko Ikuhara
Film	Sailor Moon SuperS: The Movie		December 23, 1995		Hiroki Shibata
5	Sailor Moon Sailor Stars	34	March 9, 1996	February 8, 1997	Takuya Igarashi
Sailor Moon Crystal
6	Season I: Dark Kingdom	14	July 5, 2014	January 17, 2015	Munehisa Sakai
7	Season II: Black Moon	12	February 7, 2015	July 18, 2015	Munehisa Sakai
8	Season III: Death Busters	13	April 4, 2016	June 27, 2016	Chiaki Kon
Film	Sailor Moon Eternal -Part 1-		January 8, 2021		Chiaki Kon
Film	Sailor Moon Eternal -Part 2-		February 11, 2021		Chiaki Kon
Film	Sailor Moon Cosmos -Part 1-		June 9, 2023		Tomoya Takahashi
Film	Sailor Moon Cosmos -Part 2-		June 30, 2023		Tomoya Takahashi

==== Sailor Moon ====
Toei Animation produced an anime television series based on the 52 manga chapters, also titled Pretty Soldier Sailor Moon. Junichi Sato directed the first season, Kunihiko Ikuhara took over the second through fourth season, and Takuya Igarashi directed the fifth and final season. The series premiered in Japan on TV Asahi on March 7, 1992, and ran for 200 episodes until its conclusion on February 8, 1997. Upon its release, the show quickly rose to be Toei Animation's highest-rated TV series. Most of the international versions, including the English adaptations, are titled Sailor Moon.

==== Sailor Moon Crystal ====
On July 6, 2012, Kodansha and Toei Animation announced that it would commence the production of a new anime adaptation of Sailor Moon, called Pretty Guardian Sailor Moon Crystal, for a simultaneous worldwide release in 2013 as part of the series's 20th anniversary celebrations, and stated that it would be a closer adaptation of the manga than the first anime. Crystal premiered on July 5, 2014, and new episodes would air on the first and third Saturdays of each month. A new cast was announced, along with Kotono Mitsuishi reprising her role as Sailor Moon. The first two seasons were released together, covering their corresponding arcs of the manga (Dark Kingdom and Black Moon). A third season based on the Infinity arc of the manga premiered on Japanese television on April 4, 2016, known as Death Busters in this adaptation. Munehisa Sakai directed the first and second seasons, while Chiaki Kon directed the third season.

==== Films & television specials ====
Three animated theatrical feature films based on the original Sailor Moon series have been released in Japan: Sailor Moon R: The Movie in 1993, followed by Sailor Moon S: The Movie in 1994, and Sailor Moon SuperS: The Movie in 1995. The films are side-stories that do not correlate with the timeline of the original series. A one-hour television special was aired on TV Asahi in Japan on April 8, 1995. Kunihiko Ikuhara directed the first film, while the latter two were directed by Hiroki Shibata.

In 1997, an article in Variety stated that The Walt Disney Company was interested in acquiring the rights to Sailor Moon as a live action film to be directed by Stanley Tong and Geena Davis set to portray as Queen Beryl, along with Winona Ryder and Elisabeth Shue starring as well. After Disney put the project on turnaround, Universal Pictures acquired the film rights.

In 2017, it was revealed that Pretty Guardian Sailor Moon Crystal anime's fourth season would be produced as a two-part theatrical anime film project, adapting the Dream arc from the manga. On June 30, 2019, it was announced that the title of the film would be Pretty Guardian Sailor Moon Eternal The Movie. The first film was to be released on September 11, 2020, but was postponed and released on January 8, 2021, and the second film was released on February 11, 2021. Chiaki Kon returned from Crystal's third season to direct the two films.

In 2022, it was announced that a sequel to Pretty Guardian Sailor Moon Eternal The Movie, covering the Stars arc of the manga, would also be produced as a two-part theatrical anime film project, titled Pretty Guardian Sailor Moon Cosmos The Movie. The two films were directed by Tomoya Takahashi and were released on June 9 and 30, 2023, respectively.

=== Companion books ===
There have been numerous companion books to Sailor Moon. Kodansha released some of these books for each of the five story arcs, collectively called the Original Picture Collection. The books contain cover art, promotional material, and other work by Takeuchi. Many of the drawings are accompanied by comments on the way she developed her ideas, created each picture, and commentary on the anime adaption of her story. Another picture collection, Volume Infinity, was released as a self-published, limited-edition art book after the end of the series in 1997. This art book includes drawings by Takeuchi and her friends, her staff, and many of the voice actors who worked on the anime. In 1999, Kodansha published the Materials Collection; this contained development sketches and notes for nearly every character in the manga, and for some characters that never appeared. Each drawing includes notes by Takeuchi about costume pieces, the mentality of the characters, and her feelings about them. It also includes timelines for the story arcs and for the real-life release of products and materials relating to the anime and manga. A short story, Parallel Sailor Moon, is also featured, celebrating the year of the rabbit.

=== Novels ===
Sailor Moon was also adapted for publication as novels and released in 1998. The first book was written by Stuart J. Levy. The following novels were written by Lianne Sentar. From 2018–2019, the novelization of the first story arc of the manga was adapted by Miyoko Ikeda into three volumes.

=== Stage musicals ===
In mid-1993, the first musical theater production based on Sailor Moon premiered and starred Anza Ohyama as Sailor Moon. Thirty such musicals in all have been produced, with one in pre-production. The show’s stories include anime-inspired plotlines and original material. Music from the series has been released on about 20 memorial albums. The popularity of the musicals has been cited as a reason behind the production of the live-action television series, Pretty Guardian Sailor Moon.

During the original, run musicals ran in the winter and summer of each year, with summer musicals staged at the Sunshine Theater in the Ikebukuro area of Tokyo. In the winter, musicals toured to other large cities in Japan, including Osaka, Fukuoka, Nagoya, Shizuoka, Kanazawa, Sendai, Saga, Oita, Yamagata, and Fukushima. The final incarnation of the first run, New Legend of Kaguya Island (Revised Edition) (新・かぐや島伝説 <改訂版>, Shin Kaguyashima Densetsu (Kaiteban)), went on stage in January 2005, following which, Bandai officially put the series on a hiatus. On June 2, 2013, Fumio Osano announced on his Twitter page that the Sailor Moon musicals would begin again in September 2013. The 20th anniversary show La Reconquista ran from September 13 to 23 at Shibuya's AiiA Theater Tokyo, with Satomi Ōkubo as Sailor Moon. Satomi Ōkubo reprised the role in the 2014 production Petite Étrangère, which ran from August 21 to September 7, 2014, again at AiiA Theater Tokyo.

=== Live-action film & series ===
==== Cancelled Disney film adaptation ====
During the 1990s, DIC Films and Disney had plans for a Sailor Moon film adaptation under the Walt Disney Pictures banner, but it did not make it far into development. Not much was known, except for the fact that they had intended for Geena Davis to portray Queen Beryl and that Stanley Tong was to direct it. Former child star Kirsten Dunst and Melissa Joan Hart were considered for the role of Serena, Winona Ryder and Elisabeth Shue were also supposedly in talks for the roles of the Sailor Scouts.

==== Unrealized American adaptation ====
In 1993, Renaissance-Atlantic Entertainment, Bandai, and Toon Makers, Inc. conceptualized their own version of Sailor Moon, which was half live-action and half Western-style animation. Toon Makers produced a 17-minute proof of concept pilot and a two-minute music video, both of which were directed by Rocky Solotoff, who also worked on the pilot's script. Renaissance-Atlantic presented the concept to Toei, but it was turned down, as their concept would have cost significantly more than simply exporting and dubbing the anime adaptation. The companies' work is believed by Solotoff to have been handed over to Raymond Iacovacci, one of the producers on the project, who stored the pilot script and animation cels in a storage facility. The logo created for the pilot was kept for the English dub, and Bandai released a "Moon Cycle" as part of its merchandise for the show, based on vehicles designed for the pilot.

The project was rediscovered in 1998 when the music video was screened at the Anime Expo convention in Los Angeles, where it was met with laughter by onlookers. A congoer recorded the music video and the audience response, which would later resurface on video sites such as YouTube. The pilot and the music video would go on to be discussed at conventions such as the 2011 Gen Con and 2012 Anime Expo. It was given the monikers of "Toon Makers' Sailor Moon" and "Saban Moon", despite having no connection with Saban Entertainment save for Renaissance-Atlantic Entertainment, which worked with the company on Power Rangers. The proof of concept video was widely presumed to be lost, and director Solotoff reported that he was frequently contacted by people searching for the pilot. However, in 2012, multiple animation cels from the pilot, along with the script, surfaced on the internet after a storage locker, believed to be the one owned by Iacovacci, were sold.

In 1998, Frank Ward, along with his company Renaissance-Atlantic Entertainment, tried to revive the idea of doing a live-action series based on Sailor Moon, this time called Team Angel, without the involvement of Toon Makers. A 2-minute reel was produced and sent to Bandai America, but was also rejected.

In August 2022, the proof of concept was showcased for the first time on YouTube in a documentary by Ray Mona. Mona obtained both the pilot and its music video, as well as its related materials, from the Library of Congress in Washington, D.C.

==== Pretty Guardian Sailor Moon ====
In 2003, Toei Company produced a Japanese live action Sailor Moon television series using the new translated English title of Pretty Guardian Sailor Moon. Its 49 episodes were broadcast on Chubu-Nippon Broadcasting from October 4, 2003, to September 25, 2004. Pretty Guardian Sailor Moon featured Miyuu Sawai as Usagi Tsukino, Rika Izumi (credited as Chisaki Hama) as Ami Mizuno, Keiko Kitagawa as Rei Hino, Mew Azama as Makoto Kino, Ayaka Komatsu as Minako Aino, Jouji Shibue as Mamoru Chiba, Keiko Han reprising her voice role as Luna from the original anime, and Kappei Yamaguchi voicing Artemis. The series was an alternate retelling of the Dark Kingdom arc, adding a storyline different from that in the manga and first anime series, with original characters, and new plot developments. In addition to the main episodes, two direct-to-video releases appeared after the show ended its television broadcast. "Special Act" is set four years after the main storyline ends, and shows the wedding of the two main characters. "Act Zero" is a prequel showing the origins of Sailor V and Tuxedo Mask.

=== Video games ===
The Sailor Moon franchise has spawned several video games across various genres and platforms. Most were made by Bandai and its subsidiary Angel; others were produced by Banpresto. The early games were side-scrolling fighters; later ones were unique puzzle games or versus fighting games. Another Story was a turn-based role-playing video game. The only Sailor Moon game produced outside Japan, 3VR New Media's The 3D Adventures of Sailor Moon, went on sale in North America in 1997. They were developed in association with DIC Entertainment, which held the rights to the game and the TV series. A video game called Sailor Moon: La Luna Splende (Sailor Moon: The Moon Shines) was released on March 16, 2011, for the Nintendo DS. A mobile game, titled Sailor Moon Drops, was available in Japan on September 3, 2015, and released world-wide on April 12, 2016, for iOS and Android. The mobile game was ultimately shut down on March 28, 2019.

=== Tabletop games ===
The Dyskami Publishing Company released Sailor Moon Crystal Dice Challenge, created by James Ernest of Cheapass Games and based on the Button Men tabletop game, in 2017, and Sailor Moon Crystal Truth or Bluff in 2018.

=== Theme park attractions ===
A Sailor Moon attraction, Pretty Guardian Sailor Moon: The Miracle 4-D, was announced for Universal Studios Japan. It featured Sailor Moon and the Inner Guardians arriving at the theme park, only to discover and stop the Youma's plan from stealing people's energies. The attraction ran between March 16 and July 24, 2018.

The sequel attraction, Pretty Guardian Sailor Moon The Miracle 4-D: Moon Palace Chapter, ran between May 31 and August 25, 2019, and featured all 10 Sailor Guardians and Super Sailor Moon. An enhanced attraction, titled Pretty Guardian Sailor Moon The Miracle 4-D: Moon Palace Chapter – Deluxe, ran between March 4 and August 28, 2022, and featured the same storyline as the last, as well as the Sailor Guardians in their princess forms. It is set to re-release from December 2, 2026 through April 5, 2027, alongside new Pretty Guardian Sailor Moon × Story Ride. A non-4D version of the attraction was released at Universal Studios Hollywood between April 23 and May 16, 2026 as part of Universal Fan Fest Nights.

=== Ice skating show ===
Evgenia Medvedeva as Sailor Moon at the ice show in 2024

An ice skating show of Sailor Moon was announced on June 30, 2019, starring Evgenia Medvedeva as the lead. The name for the ice-skating show was announced as Pretty Guardian Sailor Moon: Prism on Ice, as well as the additional casts, with Anza from the first Sailor Moon musicals to play Queen Serenity, and the main voice actresses of the Sailor Moon Crystal anime series to voice their individual characters. Takuya Hiramatsu from the musicals was to write the screenplay, Yuka Sato and Benji Schwimmer were to be in charge of choreography, and Akiko Kosaka & Gesshoku Kaigi were to write the music for the show. The show was set to debut in early June 2020, but was first postponed to June 2021, and later to June 2022, due to the COVID-19 pandemic, and finally cancelled on February 23, 2023, due to an "unstable world situation", following the Russo-Ukrainian war.

=== Idol group ===
A Japanese idol pop group named SG5, short for Sailor Guardians 5, was announced in June 2022. Early plans to form the group began in 2020, with the official lineup and overall concept finalized in 2022. As part of the process, the group had to seek the approval of Naoko Takeuchi by performing in front of her and giving a presentation. The group consists of five members: Sayaka, Ruri, Miyuu, Kaede, and Rui. They officially debuted in July 2022 at Anime Expo. On March 1, 2023, SG5 released their debut single "Firetruck", alongside a music video with references to the manga. The group re-debuted under the name F5ve with the single "Lettuce" in May 2024, ceasing their association with Sailor Moon.

== Reception ==
Sailor Moon is one of the most popular manga series of all time and continues to enjoy high readership worldwide. More than one million copies of its tankōbon volumes had been sold in Japan by the end of 1995. The series and its characters have been described as iconic. By the series's 20th anniversary in 2012, the manga had sold over 35 million copies in over fifty countries, and the franchise has generated $2.5 billion in worldwide merchandise sales as of 1996. By 1995, Sailor Moon merchandise was bringing in more than $250 million per year in Japan. The manga won the Kodansha Manga Award in 1993 in the shōjo genre. The English adaptations of both the manga and the anime series became the first successful shōjo title in the United States. The character of Sailor Moon is recognized as one of the most popular and influential female superheroes of all time.

The 1992 Sailor Moon anime was broadcast in Spain and France beginning in December 1993; these became the first countries outside Japan to broadcast the series. It was later aired in Russia, South Korea, the Philippines, China, Italy, Taiwan, Thailand, Indonesia, and Hong Kong, before North America picked up the franchise for adaptation. In the Philippines, Sailor Moon was one of its carrier network's main draws, helping it to become the third-biggest network in the country. In 2001, the Sailor Moon manga was Tokyopop's best-selling property, outselling the next-best-selling titles by at least a factor of 1.5. In Diamond Comic Distributors’ May 1999 "Graphic Novel and Trade Paperback" category, Sailor Moon Volume 3 was the best-selling comic book in the United States.

Academic Timothy J. Craig attributes Sailor Moon's international success to three characteristics: the show's magical girl transformation of ordinary characters into superheroes, the ability of marketers to establish the international audience's connection to characters, despite their culture being Japanese, and a female superhero protagonist, something which was still rare in global pop culture during the 1990s.

In his 2007 book Manga: The Complete Guide, Jason Thompson gave the manga series three stars out of four. He enjoyed the blending of shōnen and shōjo styles and said the combat scenes seemed heavily influenced by Saint Seiya, but shorter and less bloody. He also said the manga itself appeared similar to Super Sentai television shows. Thompson found the series fun and entertaining, but said the repetitive plot lines were a detriment to the title, which the increasing quality of art could not make up for; even so, he called the series "sweet, effective entertainment". Thompson said that although the audience for Sailor Moon is both female and male, Takeuchi does not use fan service for males, which would run the risk of alienating her female audience. Thompson said fight scenes are not physical and "boil down to their purest form of a clash of wills", which he says "makes thematic sense" for the manga. Venita Blackburn of The New York Times opined that Sailor Moon is a "transformative experience" about friendship and liberation that does not match the world's expectations of femininity, adding that its "iconic status" within the queer community was "no accident". She stated that the world of Sailor Moon is "interested in transformation, in upsetting expectations of presentation and value related to girlhood, masculinity, strength and gender roles", further adding that in Sailor Moon, the concept of transformation is "about light, magic and power hidden in the ordinariness of living", concluding that "there is nothing queerer than that".

While comparing the manga and anime, Sylvain Durand thought that the manga artwork was"gorgeous", but that its storytelling was more compressed and erratic, and the anime had more character development. Durand said "the sense of tragedy is greater" in the manga's telling of the "fall of the Silver Millennium," giving more detail about the origins of the Four Kings of Heaven and in Usagi's final battle against Queen Beryl and Metaria. Durand said the anime omits information that makes the story easy to understand, but judges the anime as more "coherent" with a better balance of comedy and tragedy, whereas the manga is "more tragic" and focused on Usagi and Mamoru's romance.

For the week of September 11, 2011, to September 17, 2011, the first volume of the re-released Sailor Moon manga was the best-selling manga on The New York Times Manga Best Sellers list, with the first volume of Codename: Sailor V in second place. The first print run of the first volume sold out after four weeks.

In English-speaking countries, Sailor Moon developed a cult following among anime fans and university students. Patrick Drazen says the Internet was a new medium that fans used to communicate and played a role in the popularity of Sailor Moon. Fans could use the Internet to discuss the series, organize campaigns to return Sailor Moon to U.S. broadcast, share information about episodes that had not yet aired, or write fan fiction. Gemma Cox of Neo magazine said part of the series's allure was that fans communicated via the Internet about the differences between the dub and the original version.

== Cultural impact and legacy ==
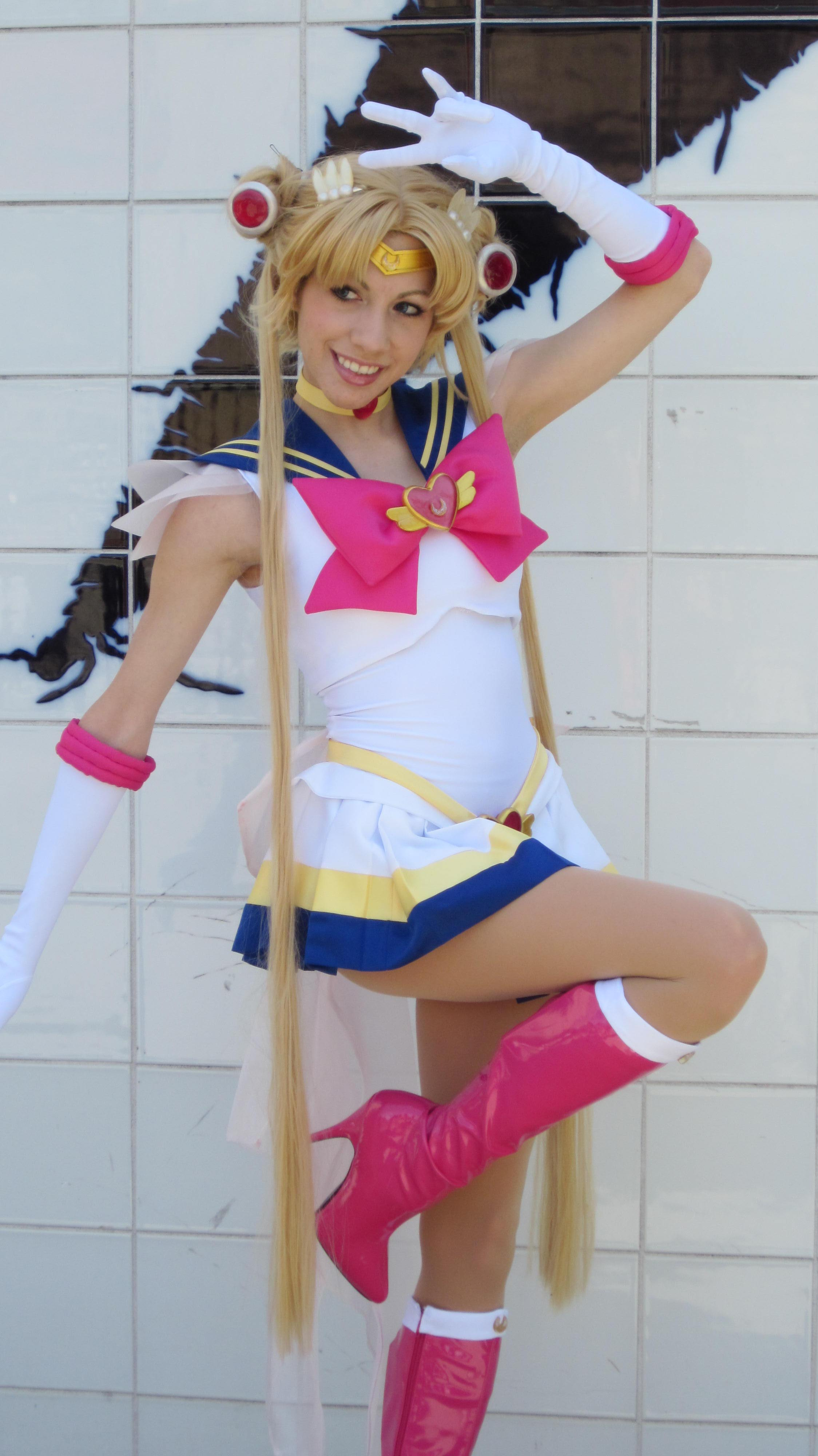
A Sailor Moon cosplayer

With their dynamic heroines and action-oriented plots, Sailor Moon is widely credited with reinvigorating the magical girl genre. After its success, many similar magical girl series, including Magic Knight Rayearth, Wedding Peach, Saint Tail, Nurse Angel Ririka SOS, Cyber Team in Akihabara, Corrector Yui, and Pretty Cure, emerged. Sailor Moon has been called "the biggest breakthrough" in English-dubbed anime until 1995, when it premiered on Canada's YTV, and "the pinnacle of little kid shōjo anime". Cultural anthropologist Rachel Thorn said that soon after Sailor Moon, shōjo manga started appearing in bookshops instead of fandom-dominated comic shops. The series is seen as kickstarting a wider movement of girls taking up shōjo manga. Canadian librarian Gilles Poitras defines a generation of anime fans as those who were introduced to anime by Sailor Moon in the 1990s, saying they were both much younger than other fans and were also mostly female.

Historian Fred Patten credits Takeuchi with popularizing the concept of a Super Sentai-like team of magical girls, and Paul Gravett credits the series with revitalizing the magical girl genre itself. A reviewer for THEM Anime Reviews also credited the anime series with changing the genre—its heroine must use her powers to fight evil, not simply have fun as previous magical girls had done. The series has been compared to Mighty Morphin Power Rangers, Buffy the Vampire Slayer, and Sabrina the Teenage Witch. Sailor Moon also influenced the development of Winx Club, W.I.T.C.H., Miraculous: Tales of Ladybug & Cat Noir, LoliRock, Star vs. the Forces of Evil, Robot Chicken, Steven Universe, and Totally Spies!.

Sailor Moon is associated with the feminist and girl power movements and with empowering its female viewers, especially regarding the "credible, charismatic and independent" characterizations of the Sailor Guardians. Sailor Moon is regarded as empowering to women and feminism in concept, particularly through the aggressive nature and strong personalities of the Guardians. It represents a specific type of feminist concept where "traditional feminine ideals [are] incorporated into characters that act in traditionally male capacities". While the Sailor Guardians are strong, independent fighters who thwart evil—which is generally a masculine stereotype—they are also ideally feminized in their Guardian transformation.

The most notable hyper-feminine features of the Sailor Guardians—and most other females in Japanese girls' comics—are the girls' thin bodies, long legs, and, in particular, round, orb-like eyes. Eyes are commonly known as the primal source within characters where emotion is evoked—sensitive characters have larger eyes than more stoic ones. The stereotypical role of women in Japanese culture is to undertake romantic and loving feelings; therefore, the prevalence of hyper-feminine qualities like the openness of the female eye in Japanese girls' comics is clearly exhibited in Sailor Moon. Thus, Sailor Moon emphasizes a type of feminist model by combining traditionally masculine action with traditionally feminine affection through the Sailor Guardians.

== Merchandise ==
Since the early 2000s, Toei Animation has collaborated with various different brands to create merchandise outside of a children's demographic. On February 20, 2020, ColourPop released a Sailor Moon-inspired makeup collection. Celebrating the 25th anniversary of Sailor Moon in the U.S., streetwear brand KITH released clothing such as hoodies and t-shirts with Sailor Moon graphics on them. In honor of Sailor Moon's 30th anniversary, brands like Sanrio, Uniqlo, and Maison de FLEUR launched a Sailor Moon collaboration in January 2022.
