= Sailor Moon Drops =

2015 mobile game

- Developer: Beeline Interactive
- Publisher: Bandai Namco Entertainment
- Series: Sailor Moon
- Platforms: iOS, Android
- Release: JP: September 3, 2015; WW: April 12, 2016
- Genre: Puzzle
- Mode: Single-player

Sailor Moon Drops (Note: Japanese: セーラームーンドロップス, Hepburn: Sērā Mūn Doroppusu) was a match-three puzzle video game developed by Beeline Interactive and published by Bandai Namco Entertainment for iOS and Android devices. It based upon Naoko Takeuchi's Sailor Moon franchise, closely following the plot of its first anime adaptation. In the game, the player must match three of more pieces of the same color and form in order to complete a level. The game has been shut down internationally after March 28, 2019.

== Gameplay ==
A player won a level after matching three red crystals with no moves left.

The game required players to match three or more crystals of six different shapes and colors, intended to correspond to the main group of Sailor Guardians, in order to complete a level. Some of the levels had to be completed before the player ran out of moves, while some others did not have moves limit but had to be completed within a certain period of time. Some other levels crystals locked within pieces of ice, which required the player to match three nearby crystals in order to unlock it, bring artifacts from the series to the bottom of the screen, or to clear an image of Luna. Other levels served as mini-boss battles, in which the player must match a number of specific crystal to defeat enemies which resembled Queen Metaria.

The main course of the game followed the plot of the first anime adaptation, with five maps each corresponding to a season of the anime. Key points of the story and the introduction of new characters were explained through mini-short animations. The game used gems as special items that could be used to gain additional moves or seconds, or to unlock new areas within maps. Though some gems were given as rewards during the game, this rarely happened. The game encouraged players to purchase gems with real money. Drops also allowed interaction with other players through the function of sending hearts (which served as lives) or to help to access other areas in the maps. As the game progressed, players were also able to unlock new poses and new attacks of the playable characters, with the latter allowing them to clear many crystals in a level.

=== Playable characters ===
The first arc introduced the five main Sailor Guardians as playable characters: Sailor Moon, Sailor Mercury, Sailor Mars, Sailor Jupiter, and Sailor Venus. Chibiusa and Sailor Pluto were introduced in the second arc, along with Sailor Moon's upgrade with the Crystal Star brooch. Haruka Tenoh and Michiru Kaioh were the new playable characters in the third arc, but in their civilian forms, along with Sailor Moon with the Cosmic Heart brooch. Chibiusa in her school uniform from Sailor Moon SuperS and Helios were added in the fourth arc. The Three Lights in their idol outfits were the new characters in the fifth arc.

There were special events in which players were required to complete a certain number of levels in a limited period of time to unlock new characters. Some of these characters were alternate forms of established characters, including school uniforms (for the five main Sailor Guardians, Sailor Pluto and the Three Lights), Sailor Guardian forms (for Chibiusa, Haruka and Michiru), princess forms (Usagi and Chibiusa), Sailor V, Sailor Saturn, the ten Solar System Guardians in the Super Sailor forms, Eternal Sailor Moon, and the Sailor Starlights. Other new characters included Luna in her human form from Sailor Moon S: The Movie, ChibiChibi (also including her Sailor Guardian and Sailor Cosmos forms), Naru Osaka, Motoki Furuhata, villains like Prince Demand, Black Lady, and Fisheye, and even Tuxedo Mask, who normally appeared in-game to help the player to gain additional moves (or time) after they failed to complete a level. Some of these events were seasonal and included the Sailor Guardians in Halloween, Christmas and other random costumes.

== Release ==
The game was first released in Japan on September 3, 2015. The English version of the game was released internationally on April 12, 2016. The game was released as part of the 25th anniversary of the Sailor Moon franchise.

=== Cancellation ===
On January 28, 2019, Bandai Namco Entertainment issued an announcement stating that the servers of the game would shut down on March 28, 2019. One of the first steps towards the cancellation of the game was that the purchase of gems was definitely suspended from the day of the announcement until the deadline. This prompted fans to issue a petition on Change.org, asking Bandai Namco not to cancel the game.

== Reception ==
Reception

Review score
Publication	Score
Common Sense Media	4/5

Vrai Kaiser from Fanbyte dubbed the game as "a warm dose of nostalgia transmitted via phone screen." Emma Lawson from ComicsAlliance positively compared the game to Candy Crush Saga and Marvel Puzzle Quest, praising the levels in which the player is required to fight enemies in a similar fashion to the latter, but by using "moonlight".
