= Pretty Guardian Sailor Moon (2003 TV series) =

Japanese television program

- The five Sailor Guardians
- Genre: Magical girl; Sentai; Tokusatsu
- Based on: Sailor Moon by Naoko Takeuchi
- Written by: Yasuko Kobayashi
- Directed by: Ryuta Tasaki
- Starring: Miyuu Sawai; Rika Izumi; Keiko Kitagawa; Mew Azama; Ayaka Komatsu; Rina Koike; Jouji Shibue; Aya Sugimoto
- Voices of: Keiko Han; Kappei Yamaguchi
- Opening theme: "Kirari*Sailor Dream!" by Sae
- Composer: Michiru Ōshima
- Country of origin: Japan
- Original language: Japanese
- No. of series: 1
- No. of episodes: 49 + 2 specials + Concert

Production
- Producers: Yūma Sakata (Dentsu); Koichi Yada (Toei Agency); Shinichiro Shirakura (Toei); Shinya Maruyama (Toei)
- Running time: 24–25 minutes (per episode)
- Production company: Chubu-Nippon Broadcasting: Toei Company

Original release
- Network: JNN (CBC)
- Release: October 4, 2003 – September 25, 2004

Related
- Sailor Moon; Sailor Moon Crystal

Pretty Guardian Sailor Moon (美少女戦士セーラームーン, Bishōjo Senshi Sērā Mūn) (Note: The live action series was the first of the Sailor Moon franchise to translate senshi into "guardian" rather than "soldier" in its official English title. Reprinted copies of the manga version adopted the English translation as well.) is a Japanese tokusatsu superhero television series based on the Sailor Moon manga created by Naoko Takeuchi. It was produced by Toei Company.

Pretty Guardian Sailor Moon (commonly referred to as PGSM) was first broadcast by Chubu-Nippon Broadcasting, airing on that station in Nagoya and on the Japan News Network nationwide from October 4, 2003, to September 25, 2004. The series was a retelling of the first Sailor Moon story arc, albeit with considerable plot divergences.

The opening theme, titled "Kirari*Sailor Dream!" (キラリ☆セーラードリーム!, Kirari Sērā Dorīmu!), was performed by J-pop singer Nanami Yumihara under the name Sae (小枝).

The series lasted 49 episodes (called "Acts") and also included two separate made-for-DVD specials.

== Plot ==
In the Dark Kingdom, an organization of great evil, Queen Beryl, her generalsーthe Four Kings of Heavenー, and an amorphous evil power named Queen Metaria reside. They attempt to steal energy so that Beryl can take over the world.

Standing in their way are the Sailor Guardians, five middle-school-aged girls - perky Usagi Tsukino, genius Ami Mizuno, paranormally gifted shrine maiden Rei Hino, tomboyish Makoto Kino, and J-pop idol Minako Aino - are sworn to protect the Princess of the Moon and defeat the Dark Kingdom. Two beings that appear to be sentient, stuffed toy cats, Luna and Artemis, serve as the girls' mentors. The Guardians also encounter Tuxedo Mask, a jewel thief in search of an immensely powerful, mystical Silver Crystal belonging to the Princess of the Moon.

While searching together for the Princess of the Moon and the Silver Crystal, the initially disparate girls develop a strong bond of friendship. Additionally, Usagi struggles with her feelings for the irksome and mysterious Mamoru Chiba. Later in the series, Metaria and Sailor Moon each get too powerful to be reined in, and the conflict shifts to one in which the Sailor Guardians attempt to postpone the inevitable destruction of the planet Earth.

=== Alterations to the original story ===
While the first few episodes of the television series are based directly on the manga and anime storylines, by the time the introduction of Sailor Jupiter was broadcast, the television show began to spin off in its own direction. Many divergences between the television series and the manga and anime were introduced. Overall, the storylines for television were more character-based and character-driven. They focused more on the girls' civilian lives and their connection to the past than on action sequences.

One of the most profound changes in the television version was made to the character of Minako Aino, who, rather than being an ordinary girl among the other Sailor Guardians, was portrayed as a famous pop idol. When introduced, she is fighting crime as "Sailor V", and makes subtle reference to this double life in her music. Her most popular song, C'est La Vie (Watashi no Naka no Koisuru Bubun) (C'est la vie 〜私のなかの恋する部分), is a Japanese pun: "Sailor V" (セーラーV, Sērā Bui) and "C'est la vie" (セ・ラ・ヴィ, Se Ra Vi) are pronounced nearly identically. Also, for the television series, Minako was given a debilitating head condition that causes her to have headaches, blurry vision, and fainting spells, which plague her through most of the series. She agrees to have an operation, but dies before the operation can be performed. This introduces a major change to the Sailor Guardian makeup as well, although Minako does later return for the final act.

In addition to plot changes, some updating was made to minor elements of the series, bringing them more in line with modern culture. For example, in the original anime and manga, there were scenes involving Ami and a cassette tape. In the new version, the tape is replaced by a MiniDisc. Instead of a transforming pen and communicators, each Guardian is given a bracelet and a magical camera phone. Also, their secret hideout is not hidden in a video arcade, but rather in a magic karaoke room.

With the new adaptation of the series, certain characters were modified to give it freshness and originality. The new characters included Sailor Luna, Dark Sailor Mercury, and Princess Sailor Moon. A new antagonist, Mio Kuroki, was also introduced.

== Development ==
The popularity of the Sailor Moon musicals contributed to the decision to produce a live-action adaptation of Sailor Moon, with creator Naoko Takeuchi becoming more closely involved in its production than she had been with the original anime. In a statement published by broadcaster Chubu-Nippon Broadcasting (CBC), Takeuchi explained that she had previously considered the franchise complete, but continued interest from fans around the world encouraged her to revisit the property. She identified live action as a format that had not yet been explored by the franchise.

The series was announced by June 2003, with Toei Company handling production. The company planned to use computer-generated special effects to adapt the magical-girl characters into live action. The five principal actresses were selected from more than 1,100 applicants across Japan. At a production press conference attended by approximately 120 members of the press, the five actresses were introduced, including 15-year-old Miyuu Sawai as Usagi Tsukino.

Producer Tsuyoshi Okazaki explained that the production sought to make the characters more relatable through live-action performances. Alongside their superhero identities, the series would emphasise everyday experiences such as school life, fashion and romance. Director Ryuta Tasaki similarly described Usagi's imagination and ability to dream as central to his interpretation of the character.

The series was principally directed by Tasaki and written by Yasuko Kobayashi, with special effects supervised by Hiroshi Butsuda of the Special Effects Research Institute, which handled the transformation sequences.

== Episodes ==
=== Television ===
No.	Title	Directed by	Written by	Original release date
1	"I Am Sailor Moon!" "Watashi ga Sērā Mūn!" (わたしがセーラームーン!)	Ryuta Tasaki	Yasuko Kobayashi	October 4, 2003
Usagi Tsukino is a 14-year-old junior high student who unexpectedly becomes a heroine after a black cat, Luna, awakens her as Sailor Moon in order to save the world. First, she must save her friend, Naru Osaka, from an evil Youma inhabiting her mother's body.
2	"Ami Becomes a Friend" "Ami-chan ga Nakama ni Natta wa" (亜美ちゃんが仲間になったわ)	Ryuta Tasaki	Yasuko Kobayashi	October 11, 2003
Ami Mizuno is the highest-ranked student in Usagi's class, and Usagi manages to befriend her despite their academic differences. But when Luna suspects that Ami might be Senshi as well, Ami also suspects that as the reason for Usagi's friendship and rejects it. When she is attacked by a Youma, Ami realizes how true a friend Usagi is and awakens as Sailor Mercury.
3	"The Third Senshi Is the Miko Named Rei" "Sanninme no Senshi wa Miko no Rei-chan" (三人目の戦士はみこのレイちゃん)	Masataka Takamaru	Yasuko Kobayashi	October 18, 2003
During a string of disappearances of miko priestesses, Usagi runs into one of them, Rei Hino, who is the prime suspect for being the cause of the missing girls. Usagi defends Rei's reputation, until the two are pulled into another dimension by a Youma, causing Rei to awaken as Sailor Mars.
4	"Sneaking Into the Party!" "Pātī ni Sennyū yo!" (パーティーに潜入よ!)	Masataka Takamaru	Yasuko Kobayashi	October 25, 2003
There is a rumour that the Mystical Silver Crystal will be exhibited at a high-society costume party. Tuxedo Mask decides to look after it, followed by Usagi, but Dark Kingdom are still one step ahead. Meanwhile, Rei refuses to cooperate with Usagi and Ami, preferring to act on her own.
5	"Is Usagi a True Friend?" "Usagi-chan wa Hontō no Tomodachi?" (うさぎちゃんは本当の友達?)	Kenzo Maihara	Yasuko Kobayashi	November 1, 2003
When Ami finds out that her friendships with Usagi and Rei are not genuine, she reads a book on how to be a true friend. This exhausts Ami and when Usagi discovers why she has changed, she becomes angry. Meanwhile, Ami gets into further trouble when she tries to defeat a Youma without calling for help.
6	"The Transfer Student Is Sailor Jupiter" "Tenkōsei wa Sērā Jupitā" (転校生はセーラージュピター)	Kenzo Maihara	Yasuko Kobayashi	November 8, 2003
Usagi is saved from bullying by a new girl in town. When Usagi realizes the girl who assisted her is at her school, she befriends her. The new girl, a tomboyish Makoto Kino, seems tough on the outside, but when she lets her guard down for a popular basketball player who turns out to be a Youma in disguise, the vulnerable Makoto must awaken as Sailor Jupiter to defeat him.
7	"He Saw Me Transforming!" "Henshin Suru no o Mirarechatta!" (変身するのをみられちゃった!)	Ryuta Tasaki	Yasuko Kobayashi	November 15, 2003
Usagi suspects that a Karaoke Crown attendant named Motoki Furuhata is Tuxedo Mask when she discovers he owns a tuxedo jacket with a hole in it. Impulsively, she asks him out on a date. Makoto and Rei are invited along with them to an amusement park where a man, Mamoru Chiba, and a friend of his join in. Things go well until a Youma attacks Rei, and Usagi unknowingly reveals to Mamoru that she is Sailor Moon.
8	"Rei and Her Father" "Rei to Otōsan" (レイとお父さん)	Ryuta Tasaki	Yasuko Kobayashi	November 22, 2003
Rei and Makoto refuse to get along with each other until Rei's father, who is a politician, insists on her presence for their monthly meal together. Believing that Rei's father is going kidnap her, Makoto gives chase and Rei opens up about her relationship to her father. Meanwhile, when Usagi works very hard for a mascot costume contest for pop idol named Minako Aino, she is attacked by Jadeite at the contest.
9	"I'll Protect the Illusion Silver Crystal" "Mamore! Maboroshi no Ginzuishō" (守れ!幻の銀水晶)	Nobuhiro Suzumura	Yasuko Kobayashi	November 29, 2003
When Tuxedo Mask reveals information about the Mystical Silver Crystal to the public to speed up the search for it, the subsequent mad rush brings a wealthy businessman to ask for Rei's protection of a gem that seems authentic. Ami goes in her place. Meanwhile, Usagi fights her feelings for Tuxedo Mask after being warned by a masked crimefighter, Sailor V, that he is the enemy. She gets into major trouble for helping him.
10	"I Am Queen Beryl, Queen of Darkness" "Warawa ga Yami no Joō Kuin Beriru" (わらわが闇の女王クイン・ベリル)	Nobuhiro Suzumura	Yasuko Kobayashi	December 6, 2003
Usagi runs away from home and decides to move in with Rei at her Shrine. There, Luna sees a connection between the legend of Princess Kaguya and the real Moon Kingdom. Meanwhile, Zoisite formulates a plan to destroy all princesses, to further his hopes of defeating the Princess of the Moon.
11	"We Got to Meet the Real Minako!" "Honmono no Minako-chan ni Atchatta!" (本物の美奈子ちゃんに会っちゃった!)	Masataka Takamaru	Yasuko Kobayashi	December 13, 2003
Minako is struck by a reckless driver in a truck and ends up being hospitalized. Usagi comes up with a plan to see her. She and Makoto obtain her autograph while Usagi creates a bad impression with Minako and her manager. Meanwhile, Rei and Ami are drawn into a trap set up by Zoisite that turns them against their companions.
12	"Sailor V's True Identity Was the Princess!" "Sērā Bui no Shōtai wa Purinsesu datta no!" (セーラーVの正体はプリンセスだったの!)	Masataka Takamaru	Yasuko Kobayashi	December 20, 2003
Usagi aids Minako into getting out of the hospital and the two of them spend some quality time together. Later on, Minako awakens herself as Sailor Venus, a Senshi that Usagi, her friends, and Dark Kingdom were searching for.
13	"The Last of the Shitennō, Kunzite, Appears" "Shitennō Saigo no Hitori Kuntsaito Arawaru" (四天王最後の一人クンツァイトあらわる)	Kenzo Maihara	Yasuko Kobayashi	December 27, 2003
Usagi and Mamoru meet a kind of amnesiac named Shin, and Usagi decides to help him remember his life, though he seems not to want to. With Mamoru's help, Shin and Usagi became acquaintances. Meanwhile, the evil Queen Beryl intends to awaken her fourth general, Kunzite, who happens to be Shin's true identity. Kunzite infects Sailor Moon with a spell that starts to slowly transform her into a Youma.
14	"Usagi Is Turning Into a Youma?" "Usagi ga Yōma ni?" (うさぎが妖魔に?)	Kenzo Maihara	Yasuko Kobayashi	January 10, 2004
Usagi faints after her recovery from Kunzite's spell to transform her into a Youma and they discover it is fighting her will. While Makoto and Rei search for means to stop this from happening, Ami does her best to help Usagi in the toughest fight of her life.
15	"I'll Punish the Thief!" "Dorobō o Oshioki yo!" (どろぼうをおしおきよ!)	Nobuhiro Suzumura	Yasuko Kobayashi	January 17, 2004
Minako's jewellery is stolen, and Usagi teams up with Mamoru to catch the thieves. Once they manage to escape them, Mamoru is injured when a Youma also comes to steal the jewels from them.
16	"I Must Save Osaka!" "Ōsaka-san o Tasukenakya!" (大阪さんをたすけなきゃ!)	Nobuhiro Suzumura	Yasuko Kobayashi	January 24, 2004
Naru and Ami become bitter rivals for Usagi's friendship, but when a Youma kidnaps Naru and transfers her to a place where the energy of many humans is being stolen, Ami sets aside her differences to save Naru at all costs. As a result the two become better friends, rendering Usagi especially happy.
17	"Minako Transforms in Front of Rei's Eyes!" "Rei no Me no Mae de Minako ga Henshin!" (レイのめのまえで美奈子が変身!)	Takemitsu Sato	Yasuko Kobayashi	January 31, 2004
Minako and Rei encounter an abandoned dog at a church they attend. While caring for the dog, a Youma attacks the pastor and Rei fights her. Despite her cat, Artemis's objections, Minako reveals to Rei that she is Sailor Venus, but is quickly disappointed when Rei lets the Youma escape when she is injured.
18	"At Last, All Five Sailor Senshi Are Together" "Tsui ni Sorotta Gonin no Sērā Senshi" (ついにそろった5人のセーラー戦士)	Takemitsu Sato	Yasuko Kobayashi	February 7, 2004
Minako and Rei argue over their respective meanings of being Sailor Senshi. When the Youma that leaves Rei reappears, along with Jadeite and Nephrite, it takes the combined power of all five Senshi to defeat them.
19	"Usagi's Nervous Valentine" "Usagi no Dokidoki Barentain" (うさぎのドキドキバレンタイン)	Masataka Takamaru	Yasuko Kobayashi	February 14, 2004
Usagi decides to help a little girl called named Hikari Nozaki to find a Valentine's Day present for the boy she likes. When Usagi discovers that the boy's crush is on Mamoru's girlfriend, Hikari's determination to prove herself to him inspires Usagi to pursue Mamoru.
20	"Hina Was Mamoru's Fiancée..." "Hina-san wa Mamoru no Kon'yakusha datta no..." (陽菜さんは衛の婚約者だったの....)	Masataka Takamaru	Yasuko Kobayashi	February 21, 2004
Hikari asks Usagi to go on a double date with her and Mamoru, but learns innocently that he and a woman, Hina Kusaka, are engaged. Meanwhile, Minako's warning to Usagi regarding Tuxedo Mask reveals his identity. Rei goes off on her own, wishing to become a stronger Senshi. When Ami contemplates that her bond with Rei is not as strong as it should be, she is then attacked and kidnapped by Kunzite.
21	"What Did You Do to Ami!?" "Ami-chan ni Nani o Shita!" (亜美ちゃんになにをした!)	Kenzo Maihara	Yasuko Kobayashi	February 28, 2004
Makoto cares for an sickened Ami while Usagi tries to sort out her feelings for Mamoru and Rei sets off on her own mission. After Ami recovers, she is then trapped and brainwashed by Kunzite to become an evil senshi, Dark Sailor Mercury, turning against her former companions.
22	"Ami Becomes an Enemy..." "Ami-chan ga Teki no te ni..." (亜美ちゃんが敵のてに...)	Kenzo Maihara	Yasuko Kobayashi	March 6, 2004
Usagi finds out that Ami's sudden dark change in personality turns Usagi's class against her. As Rei and Makoto fight a Youma, Ami challenges Usagi to a fight. Sailor Moon awakens an incredible power: her compassionate tears nearly free Ami from Kunzite's influence, but Kunzite takes Ami away again. With hopes restored anew, they vow to bring Ami back.
23	"In Order to Awaken Her Senshi Powers, Rei Sings" "Senshi no Chikara o Mezamesaseru tame, Utau Rei" (戦士の力を目覚めさせるため、うたうレイ)	Takemitsu Sato	Yasuko Kobayashi	March 13, 2004
Minako arranges for Rei to perform for hospital children as a J-Pop singer under the name "Reiko Mars". Rei eventually overcame her insecurity and dislike of singing with Usagi's help. The lesson of learning to rely on and trust others helps Rei awaken her sterner powers as a Senshi, allowing her to defeat Nephrite single-handedly.
24	"I Can't Forget About Mamoru Chiba After All" "Yappari Chiba Mamoru no Koto ga Wasurerarenai no" (やっぱり地場衛のことがわすれられないの)	Takemitsu Sato	Yasuko Kobayashi	March 20, 2004
Mamoru decides to study abroad, much to Usagi's sorrow. When Mamoru is attacked by Kunzite, alerting her and Makoto to the danger he is in, Usagi rushes to save him despite Makoto's warnings. In the attack, Sailor Moon's power fends off Kunzite's attack, causing Kunzite to flee with new suspicions. Usagi eventually realizes that Tuxedo Mask's true identity is indeed Mamoru.
25	"So Tuxedo Mask's True Identity was Mamoru Chiba..." "Takishīdo Kamen no Shōtai ga Chiba Mamoru datta nante..." (タキシード仮面の正体が地場衛だったなんて...)	Masataka Takamaru	Yasuko Kobayashi	March 27, 2004
Usagi comes to grips with the realisation that Mamoru being Tuxedo Mask as Hina means his feelings for her might not be true. Usagi gets involved in an attack by a Youma and convinces Mamoru to stay with her regardless of his feelings. When one final appearance by Tuxedo Mask sees him mortally wounded, Usagi awakens an incredible hidden power that reveals her as the moon princess, Princess Serenity, who has the power to heal the dead.
26	"Usagi Is the Real Princess!" "Usagi-chan ga Hontō no Purinsesu!" (うさぎちゃんが本当のプリンセス!)	Masataka Takamaru	Yasuko Kobayashi	April 3, 2004
After the moon Princess is discovered to be Usagi, Luna tells Usagi's friends the story of the Moon Kingdom. True to their fate, Usagi and Mamoru are torn apart when he decides to leave for England. Hina decides to end their relationship due to his feelings toward her and Usagi. Makoto and Usagi try to meet him at the airport but encounter Nephrite and a Youma along the way.
27	"Luna Became a Sailor Senshi!" "Runa ga Sērā Senshi ni Natchatta!" (ルナがセーラー戦士になっちゃった!)	Kenzo Maihara	Yasuko Kobayashi	April 17, 2004
A mysterious blue-haired Senshi appears and discovers the spell holding Ami has weakened considerably, causing much painful conflict. She tries to tell each of the group who she is but is interrupted by strange cat-like behavior. Usagi receives a phone call from Ami and goes alone to face her, only to be joined by the new Senshi who turns out to be Luna, who happens to be transformed into a humanoid by the Silver Crystal. A terrifying shock during her battle with Usagi frees Ami from Kunzite's spell, but she is changed.
28	"Welcome Back, Ami!" "Ami-chan Okaeri!" (亜美ちゃんおかえり!)	Kenzo Maihara	Yasuko Kobayashi	April 24, 2004
After Ami realizes the gravity of injuring Usagi, Kunzite's control over her is broken and she flees with Usagi into a forest that seems to move around them as they try to escape it. Kunzite plays a game with his former ward as Ami grapples with her emotional state and understanding what she has done, alienates herself from Usagi. But with help from Ami's friends, the Senshi reunite and unlock a power even greater than that they shared before.
29	"Minako's Rival, Mio Kuroki, Is a Transfer Student?" "Minako no Raibaru, Kuroki Mio ga Tenkōsei?" (美奈子のライバル、黒木ミオが転校生?)	Takemitsu Sato	Yasuko Kobayashi	May 1, 2004
A new popstar, Mio Kuroki, starts to upstage Minako in showbusiness, while at the same time transferring to Juuban Middle High School: coincidentally enough, to the same class Usagi is in. Inadvertently, Usagi and Mio are present when a Youma attacks. Unable to reveal her identity as Sailor Moon after Mio is injured, she hides her, not realizing that Mio has something else planned for her.
30	"Mio Deceives Usagi" "Usagi o Damasō to suru Mio" (うさぎをだまそうとするミオ)	Takemitsu Sato	Yasuko Kobayashi	May 8, 2004
Usagi's classmates give her the cold shoulder after Mio makes them think her wounds are Usagi's fault. Mio suggests a live concert with Minako and offers to use her connections to give the message to her and when Minako does not appear, Usagi lands in more hot water... that is until Minako unexpectedly appears, spoiling Mio's plan. Minako is then stunned by Usagi's forgiveness of Mio who claims she did it to be closer to Usagi.
31	"Jupiter Awakens Her Senshi Powers!" "Jupitā ga Senshi no Chikara ni Mezameta!" (ジュピターが戦士の力に目覚めた!)	Masataka Takamaru	Yasuko Kobayashi	May 15, 2004
Motoki finally gathers the nerve to ask Makoto on a date; Makoto is uncomfortable with how distantly she acts, but the date persists after Luna's interference. Makoto ends up rejecting Motoki, then gets into a ferocious battle. With the power of nature speaking to her, she finally begins to understand her purpose and awakens her full powers.
32	"Mamoru Came Back" "Kaette kita Mamoru" (かえってきた衛)	Masataka Takamaru	Yasuko Kobayashi	May 22, 2004
Usagi finds out that Mamoru has gone astray in London, and is determined to find him at any costs. Despite her friends and Luna's objections, she asks Mio for help, who hooks her up with a popular television idol as his assistant and a ticket to London as payment. But when he turns out to be a Youma in disguise, Mamoru appears as the prince of earth, Prince Endymion, to defeat the Youma and the two of them make an important decision regarding their future together.
33	"Ami Is Changing Schools?" "Ami-chan ga Tenkō?" (亜美ちゃんが転校?)	Kenzo Maihara	Yasuko Kobayashi	May 29, 2004
When a Youma appears in the middle of the night, Rei drives it off while Ami comes to meet Rei, until the two are caught by the police. Ami's mother arrives and admits this as the reason behind recent absences at cram school. Rei's father also arrives to express his concern, much to Rei's chagrin. When Ami's mother suggests transferring schools without consulting Ami's feelings about this, Ami is torn between her duties as a friend and Senshi and her mother.
34	"A Mother-and-Daughter Talk" "Hanashiau Oyako" (はなしあう親子)	Kenzo Maihara	Yasuko Kobayashi	June 5, 2004
Ami decides to run away from home, and ends up developing a strong bond with Rei because of their distant relationships with their parents. Together, they decide to try to close their old wounds.
35	"Sailor Venus and Zoisite Are Working Together?" "Sērā Vīnasu to Zoisaito ga Kyōryoku?" (セーラーヴィーナスとゾイサイトが協力?)	Nobuhiro Suzumura	Yasuko Kobayashi	June 12, 2004
After learning that Zoisite wishes to stop the destruction of the world, Minako cooperates with him to prevent the Moon Princess from being with Prince Endymion. A music box starts wearing away at Usagi's memories of Mamoru, but she instead witnesses how great Usagi's love for him is. When Usagi attends Minako's concert, she witnesses Minako collapse on stage.
36	"Princess Sailor Moon Appears!" "Purinsesu Sērā Mūn Tōjō!" (プリンセス・セーラームーン登場!)	Nobuhiro Suzumura	Yasuko Kobayashi	June 19, 2004
Minako confesses to Rei that her illness is terminal with only a small chance that surgery can save her and asks her to take up as leader of the Senshi when she dies. Meanwhile, Queen Beryl holds Jadeite, Nephrite, Zoisite and Kunzite hostage to take Endymion by force. This awakens Princess Sailor Moon who displays an incredible amount of power that only Mamoru can restrain. Despite this, he departs with his former warriors, much to Kunzite's surprise, and Nephrite is dealt a deadly surprise.
37	"The Princess Will Cause a Catastrophe!?" "Purinsesu ga Wazawai o Okosu!?" (プリンセスがわざわいをおこす!?)	Masataka Takamaru	Yasuko Kobayashi	June 26, 2004
When the power of the Princess Sailor Moon manifests itself again, Usagi disappears and her friends search the whole of Tokyo for her. Meanwhile, with Metaria's powers growing immensely, Mamoru begins to grasp the concept of Usagi's true power as he asks his former companions for help. After a handful of Youma are defeated by the Senshi, they discover the Sailor Moon bathed in a radiant light, playing a harp.
38	"Believe Me! I Definitely Won't Destroy the Planet!" "Shinjite! Zettai, Hoshi wa Horobinai!" (信じて!ぜったい、星はほろびない!!)	Masataka Takamaru	Yasuko Kobayashi	July 3, 2004
Usagi shares with a remorseful Princess Serenity the memories of her first meeting with Mamoru and their falling into love. Mamoru reminisces as well, deciding that he must make Usagi his enemy in order to keep them apart which shocks and upsets her. She promises the moon princess that no matter what, she will not use the Mystical Silver Crystal.
39	"Usagi's Mother's Challenge as a Reporter!!" "Usagi-chan no Mama ga Repōtā ni Chōsen!!" (うさぎちゃんのママがレポーターにちょうせん!!)	Kenzo Maihara	Yasuko Kobayashi	July 10, 2004
Usagi finds that Minako's flamboyant manager, Sugao Saitou, used to be a classmate of her mother, and decides to help her with her big chance as a TV reporter. During training, Usagi is targeted by a Youma and separates from her mother and brother to keep them safe. When Mamoru arrives, claiming to be Usagi's enemy, the shock awakens the Mystical Silver Crystal, putting her brother, Shingo, in danger.
40	"Minako vs. Rei - Where's the Battle?" "Minako Bui Esu Rei Batoru no Yukue wa?" (美奈子VSレイ バトルのゆくえは?)	Kenzo Maihara	Yasuko Kobayashi	July 17, 2004
When Minako resolves to give up her singing career and focus on being a Senshi, Artemis goes to Rei for help and decides that she needs to provide some competition. With Sugao's help, they arrange a television competition where the six Senshi face one another in games to help Minako realize the meaning of friendship and restart her singing career.
41	"Actually, I'm a Senshi!" "Jitsu wa Senshi nano!" (じつは戦士なの!)	Takemitsu Sato	Yasuko Kobayashi	July 24, 2004
Ami, Usagi, Naru and Makoto volunteer at a children's school as part of their summer homework and Usagi tries unsuccessfully to set Makoto back up with Motoki, seeing them as a match. When a mysterious wave of energy begins making people collapse, Makoto and Usagi come to situations where they must reveal their identities to Motoki and Naru in order protect them from a Youma. A strong Youma awakens the Princess whose display of power proves to be as much of a danger to Naru as it does to the Youma.
42	"I Won't Use the Power of the Illusion Silver Crystal!" "Maboroshi no Ginzuishō no Chikara wa Tsukawanai!" (幻の銀水晶の力はつかわない!)	Takemitsu Sato	Yasuko Kobayashi	July 31, 2004
Naru tells Usagi she trusts her, though she's upset that she kept being Sailor Moon secret for so long. And to keep her from using the Mystical Silver Crystal, begins training her endurance to keep it from awakening again. Meanwhile, Beryl has Jadeite infect Mamoru with a stone that drains his life when he thinks about or is near Usagi. One of Queen Metaria's Youma attacks, draining the life force of several people in the city including Naru. Usagi's conflict with Serenity comes to head when she selfishly refuses to see what the consequences of her actions will be for Earth. Rei confronts Mio and tells her that she knows the truth. She intends tell her friends about Mio unless she allows Usagi to see Mamoru one last time.
43	"Usagi and Mamoru's Promise" "Usagi to Mamoru no Yakusoku" (うさぎと衛の約束)	Nobuhiro Suzumura	Yasuko Kobayashi	August 7, 2004
Mamoru is granted one day with Usagi in order to help her to control the Silver Crystal. If he returns by sunset the stone in his body will be removed and his life will no longer be in jeopardy. After a fight with a Youma on the beach though, Mamoru stays well past sunset acting romantically towards Usagi, teaching her to always smile and never to give in to negative emotions. What fate lies in wait for Mamoru upon his return?
44	"Zoisite Turned Back Into a Stone" "Ishi ni Modotta Zoisaito" (石にもどったゾイサイト)	Nobuhiro Suzumura	Yasuko Kobayashi	August 14, 2004
Concerned that Queen Metalia's powers are slowly sapping Mamoru's life away, Zoisite decides to have his life claimed to save Mamoru. Queen Beryl, however, proposes that he take Usagi's life instead. He sends a Youma to face her while the other Senshi it off. Queen Metaria sends one herself to deal with Sailor Moon. Coming to realize the meaning of sacrifice from Mamoru however, Zoisite chooses to make one of his own. Minako slowly begins to suffer the effects of her disease and Kunzite also makes a sacrifice of his own to save his prince from Beryl.
45	"Youma Metalia's Violent Attack" "Metaria Yōma no Hageshī Kōgeki" (メタリア妖魔のはげしい攻撃)	Masataka Takamaru	Yasuko Kobayashi	August 21, 2004
After Rei's argument puts her leadership in question, Minako decides to assert her charge over the Senshi. But when a Youma attacks her and Makoto she finds herself unable to transform into Sailor Venus. When Sailor Jupiter wounds the Youma, Metaria takes matters into her own hands and possesses the Youma. Realizing her mission is more important than her life, as Venus believes, Jupiter attempts to destroy the Youma by overloading it with power, putting her life in risk.
46	"Sailor Venus Awakens Her Senshi Powers" "Senshi no Chikara ni Mezameta Sērā Vīnasu" (戦士の力にめざめたセーラーヴィーナス)	Masataka Takamaru	Yasuko Kobayashi	August 28, 2004
Minako refuses to have any part of her current life, her mind set on the past life, even to the point of turning her back on Artemis. Makoto comes to realize that her previous theory that she is better alone may be wrong when Motoki is afflicted by the comas now spreading throughout the world. Matters come into perspective for Minako when she finally realizes she shouldn't sacrifice what she has for what has been and at last she awakens her Senshi powers. Usagi is able to temporarily take control of Princess Sailor Moon and use her powers to save people.
47	"Goodbye, Minako" "Sayōnara, Minako" (さようなら、美奈子)	Nobuhiro Suzumura	Yasuko Kobayashi	September 4, 2004
Minako accepts a deal to have surgery, though there is a minimal chance of success. As Minako's friends make preparations for a "Welcome Back" party, Artemis delivers news that is devastating. In a fight against a Youma, an enraged Rei activates her powers and defeats the Youma out of anger. Later on, the Senshi mourn over Minako's loss as Rei reads them her final words in case she doesn't come back.
48	"Mamoru is Captured by Metalia!" "Mamoru ga Metaria ni Nottorareta!" (衛がメタリアにのっとられた!)	Nobuhiro Suzumura	Yasuko Kobayashi	September 18, 2004
Defying Queen Beryl, Mamoru allows himself to become influenced by Queen Metaria to convince Usagi that he has matters under control. He orders Kunzite into a duel with the intent to defeat Queen Metaria, but Jadeite (under Queen Beryl's orders) intervenes and accidentally kills Kunzite. Kunzite's defeat proves to be too much for Mamoru, causing him to become Metaria Endymion. When Usagi arrives with Mio, Metaria Endymion destroys her for her troublesome ways. In spite of the revelation, Usagi's only option is to defeat Metaria Endymion to save her friends by using Endymion's sword. Ami begs her not to, warning her that Serenity will take over again if she goes through with destroying Mamoru.
Final–Act	"The Five Sailor Senshi Surpassed Their Previous Lives" "Zense o Norikoeta Gonin no Senshi-tachi" (前世をのりこえた5人の戦士たち)	Kenzo Maihara	Yasuko Kobayashi	September 25, 2004
After Metaria Endymion's defeat, Usagi awakens again by the spirit of Princess Serenity in the form of Princess Sailor Moon and seeks to destroy Earth yet again. Despite their best efforts, Jupiter, Mars and Mercury are unable to stop her and Earth is destroyed, killing everyone there. On the destroyed Earth, Princess Serenity finally sees the consequences of her actions and grieves for the people of Earth. Soon, a revived Mamoru convinces Serenity to sacrifice the Mystical Silver Crystal to restore Earth, giving everyone a new chance at life. When her friends remember her, Usagi too is resurrected with Mamoru. Usagi makes peace with Serenity (as Princess Sailor Moon) and returns to Earth with Mamoru.

=== Direct-to-video ===
No.	Title	Directed by	Written by	Original release date
Special–Act	"We're Getting Married!!" "Watashi-tachi Kekkon Shimasu!!" (わたしたち結婚します!!)	Kenzo Maihara	Yasuko Kobayashi	November 24, 2004
Four years after the world is restored, Usagi and Mamoru are engaged. Evil rises again, however, in the form of a reborn Mio Kuroki and with Rei incapacitated, the remaining Sailor Senshi must reunite and battle one more time.
Act.ZERO	"The Birth of Sailor V" "Sērā Bui Tanjō" (セーラーV誕生)	Masataka Takamaru	Yasuko Kobayashi	March 25, 2005
This episode explores how Artemis met Minako and made her aware of her calling as the elusive crimefighter Sailor V (much like Luna would do with Usagi later), while Usagi and her friends decide to help out by trying to stop thieves assaulting Naru's mother's jewellery store.
Act.ZERO	"Hina Afterward" "Hina... Sonogo" (陽菜...その後)	Masataka Takamaru	Yasuko Kobayashi	March 25, 2005
A short drama showing what happened to Hina after she left Mamoru.
Act.ZERO	"Tuxedo Mask's Secret Birth" "Takishīdo Kamen Tanjō no Himitsu" (タキシード仮面 誕生の秘密)	Masataka Takamaru	Yasuko Kobayashi	March 25, 2005
Usagi wants to know how Mamoru became Tuxedo Mask.

== DVD specials ==
=== Pretty Guardian Sailor Moon: Special Act ===
A sequel to the series, set four years after the defeat of the Dark Kingdom, portrays the wedding of Mamoru Chiba and Usagi Tsukino. Before their wedding they do battle with Mio Kuroki, who has been resurrected and claims to be the new queen of the Dark Kingdom. She kidnaps Mamoru and Usagi and intends to force Mamoru to marry her. The Shitennou are revived, however, and help their master to defeat Mio's monster, Sword and Shield. Meanwhile, the Sailor Guardians, excluding Sailor Mars who is hospitalized with injuries from battling Mio while in her civilian state, use the Moon Sword provided by Queen Serenity to restore their power, enabling them to transform and defeat Mio. The story ends with Usagi and Mamoru's wedding, as well as Motoki and Makoto's engagement.

=== Pretty Guardian Sailor Moon: Act Zero ===
The last special made for the series is a prequel that leads directly to the first episode. Minako Aino meets Artemis and at Christmas becomes Sailor V. She must use her newfound powers to foil a stage magician/jewel thief called Q.T. Kenko and his Killer Girl assistants. Meanwhile, Usagi and her friends decide to dress in their own homemade sailor fuku (Usagi as Sailor Rabbit, Naru as Sailor N, and their other friends, Kanami and Momoko as sailors K and M) in order to scare the thieves away from the jewellery store owned by Naru Osaka's mother, only for Usagi to get kidnapped by Kenko. The actors who portray the Four Kings of Heaven are featured as the inexperienced police officer's group self-dubbed the "Police Four Kings of Heaven" for comic relief. They consist of Captain Kuroi (Kunzite), Officer Akai (Nephrite), Officer Shiroi (Zoisite), and female Officer Hanako (Jadeite). The story ends with Luna burning through the atmosphere to come to Earth and give Usagi her powers.

==== Mini-episodes ====
Act Zero also comes with two mini-episodes. Each one is approximately five minutes long and tells a brief short story. "Hina Afterward" shows what happened to Hina after breaking off her engagement to Mamoru Chiba. "Tuxedo Mask's Secret Birth" shows the origin of the Tuxedo Mask persona. It includes a joke-transformation sequence in which, rather than transforming magically, he pulls on his clothes with dramatic flair.

=== Super Dance Lesson ===
This is a short video hosted by Luna, Sailor Jupiter, and Sailor Moon, which instructs the viewer how to perform the dances from different songs from Pretty Guardian Sailor Moon. The dances included are for the songs Romance and Here We Go! -Shinjiru Chikara- (-信じるチカラ-, Here We Go!). Demonstrations are also given for C'est La Vie ~ The part of me that I love (C'est la Vie 〜私のなかの恋する部分; Se ra Bui ~Watashi no Naka no Koi suru Bubun) and Kirari*Sailor Dream! (キラリ☆セーラードリーム!, Kirari Sērā Dorīmu!) although no formal instructions are provided for how to dance to them.

=== Kirari Super Live! ===
A Special Live Event occurred on May 2, 2004, at Yomiuri Hall. This Special Event was held for the 1,000 winners of the Sailormoon Campaign (a contest held earlier in the year, in which viewers had to send in UPC symbols to enter). The event combines musical performances, in which the cast members sing and dance to songs from the Pretty Guardian Sailor Moon series, and a dramatic storyline with spoken dialogue, in which the Sailor Guardians have to stop the Four Kings of Heaven from stealing the energy of the audience members. The concert was recorded and released on DVD. It also includes bonus behind-the-scenes footage of the performance and interviews with the cast members.

== Cast ==
- Miyuu Sawai as Usagi Tsukino/Sailor Moon/Princess Serenity/Princess Sailor Moon
- Rika Izumi as Ami Mizuno/Sailor Mercury/Dark Mercury
- Keiko Kitagawa as Rei Hino/Sailor Mars
- Mew Azama as Makoto Kino/Sailor Jupiter
- Ayaka Komatsu as Minako Aino/Sailor V/Sailor Venus
- Rina Koike as Sailor Luna
- Keiko Han as Luna (voice, cat form)
- Kappei Yamaguchi as Artemis (voice)
- Jouji Shibue as Mamoru Chiba/Tuxedo Kamen/Prince Endymion
- Aya Sugimoto as Queen Beryl
- Jun Masuo as Jadeite
- Hiroyuki Matsumoto as Nephrite
- Yoshito Endō as Zoisite
- Akira Kubodera as Kunzite
- Alisa Durbrow as Mio Kuroki
- Chieko Ochi as Naru Osaka
- Masaya Kikawada as Motoki Furuhata
- Kaori Moriwaka as Ikuko Tsukino
- Naoki Takeshi as Shingo Tsukino
- Moeko Matsushita as Hina Kusaka
- Narushi Ikeda as Sugao Saitou, Minako's manager
- Katsumi Shiono as Youma

== Music ==
In March and April 2004, singles for each of the five Sailor Guardians were released with image songs on them. Pretty Guardian Sailor Moon Original Song Album ~ Dear My Friend was released in June 2004. A 3-CD box set, Moonlight Real Girl was published in September 2004.

=== DJ MOON ===
- Pretty Guardian Sailor Moon DJ MOON 1
- Pretty Guardian Sailor Moon DJ MOON 2
- Pretty Guardian Sailor Moon DJ MOON 3

=== Koro-chan Packs ===
- Pretty Guardian Sailor Moon Koro-chan Pack 1
- Pretty Guardian Sailor Moon Koro-chan Pack 2
- Pretty Guardian Sailor Moon Koro-chan Pack 3

=== Moonlight Real Girl ===
- Pretty Guardian Sailor Moon Moonlight Real Girl Memorial CD Box: Disc 1 Original Soundtrack "Rare Track Collection": Michiru Ōshima
- Pretty Guardian Sailor Moon Moonlight Real Girl Memorial CD Box: Disc 2 One night limit of the special radio program series DJ Moon
- Pretty Guardian Sailor Moon Moonlight Real Girl Memorial CD Box: Disc 3 Minako Aino's original album I'll Be Here

=== Other albums ===
- Pretty Guardian Sailor Moon Original Song Album "Dear My Friend"
- Pretty Guardian Sailor Moon ~ Complete Song Collection ~

=== Singles ===
- Pretty Guardian Sailor Moon Sparkling * Sailor Dream!
- Pretty Guardian Sailor Moon Character Songs Sailor Moon Usagi Tsukino (Miyū Sawai)
- Pretty Guardian Sailor Moon Character Songs Sailor Mercury Ami Mizuno (Rika Izumi)
- Pretty Guardian Sailor Moon Character Songs Sailor Mars Rei Hino (Keiko Kitagawa)
- Pretty Guardian Sailor Moon Character Songs Sailor Jupiter Makoto Kino (Myū Azama)
- Pretty Guardian Sailor Moon Character Songs Sailor Venus Minako Aino (Ayaka Komatsu)

== Distribution ==
There are several radio programs called "DJ Moon" based on the show that originated from Chubu-Nippon Broadcasting radio and which were broadcast on other radio networks in Japan. The shows were a combination of a radio drama and promotional tool for the TV series, often foreshadowing upcoming events. These shows were later sold on CD.

In addition to the series, there was also a stage musical performance, Kirari Super Live!, by characters on the show. Some footage from the filming of the stage show was used in the television broadcast. A special limited-edition promotional video, Super Dance Lesson, was available for purchase only through order forms found in the magazines Youchien, Mebae, and Shougaku Ichinensei in July 2004.

== Home media ==
On 22 September 2011, Bandai Visual released the Pretty Guardian Sailor Moon Super Special DVD-BOX in Japan to commemorate the 20th anniversary of the original manga. The 14-disc collection contained all 49 television episodes, the Kirari Super Live! stage performance, and the original video productions Special Act and Act Zero. Additional material included cast and crew interviews, behind-the-scenes footage, and previously released short dramas. The collection retailed for ¥31,500.

== Legacy ==
In May 2022, Keiko Kitagawa described the series as a major turning point in her life and recalled that the inexperienced young cast learned about acting and television production throughout the year's filming. She later returned to the franchise as the voice of Sailor Cosmos in the 2023 animated film Pretty Guardian Sailor Moon Cosmos.

To commemorate the series' 20th anniversary, CBC broadcast a television reunion special, Sailor Senshi: 20th Anniversary Reunion, on 25 December 2023. The programme reunited the five principal actresses, who discussed their original auditions, experiences filming the series, and their friendships following its conclusion.

== See also ==
- Sailor Moon musicals

Preceded by Kirby: Right Back at Ya! (10/6/2001 - 9/27/2003)	Chubu-Nippon Broadcasting Saturday Morning 7:30 Timeframe; Pretty Guardian Sailor Moon: The Live-Action Series (October 4, 2003 - September 25, 2004)	Succeeded by Ultraman Nexus (10/2/2004 - 6/25/2005)
