= Luna (Sailor Moon) =

Character in Sailor Moon

- Sailor Moon character
- Luna as seen in the 1990s anime
- First appearance: Sailor Moon chapter #1: Usagi - Sailor Moon (December 1991)
- Created by: Naoko Takeuchi
- Voiced by: Japanese: Keiko Han; Ryō Hirohashi (Sailor Moon Crystal); English: Jill Frappier (DiC and CWi dub); Michelle Ruff (Viz dub)

In-universe information
- Aliases: Luna Tsukino; Sailor Luna
- Significant others: Artemis
- Children: Diana
- Affiliations: Sailor Guardians
- Powers and abilities: Speech capability Materialization of magical items Shapeshifting

Luna (Japanese: ルナ, Hepburn: Runa) is a fictional character in the Sailor Moon media franchise. She is a black cat who has the ability to talk, and serves as a mentoring figure for the titular character and her companions, the Sailor Guardians. Luna makes her debut in the first act or episode of each version of the series, in which she meets Usagi Tsukino and tells her she is Sailor Moon, and gives her a brooch that allows her to transform. Luna features prominently in the first story arc, and although she becomes a supporting character for the rest of the series, she keeps providing the Sailor Guardians and Tuxedo Mask with advice, her family relationships are explored alongside her partner Artemis and their daughter from the future Diana, and she even manages to transform into a human being at key points of the series (including the ability to transform into a Sailor Guardian in the 2003 live-action series).

== Profile ==
Luna first appears in the series as a mysterious black cat with a crescent moon mark on the forehead that meets Usagi and tells her she is Sailor Moon, a Guardian destined to fight evil. Luna gives Usagi the mission to find her fellow Sailor Guardians and Princess Serenity, whom, unbeknown to both of them, is Usagi herself. The two of them meet Ami Mizuno, Rei Hino, and Makoto Kino, whom Luna assist to awake respectively as Sailor Mercury, Sailor Mars, and Sailor Jupiter, before encountering Sailor Venus and Artemis, a male white cat that also has the ability to speak and who has been secretly providing Luna with details on her mission.

Halfway through the first arc, Luna's backstory is revealed: in the Silver Millennium, she was a servant to Princess Serenity, sworn never to leave her side, as well as an advisor to her mother, Queen Serenity. When the Moon Kingdom fell at the hands of the Dark Kingdom, she and Artemis were put into a long sleep and sent down to Earth to look after the Sailor Guardians, who would eventually be reborn there. Part of Luna's memory was suppressed, in order to make her task easier; she only knew that she was supposed to find and awaken the Sailor Guardians of the inner Solar System. Further details on Luna and Artemis' origin are revealed in the final arc of the manga, in which it is stated they were born in Planet Mau, home planet of the evil Sailor Tin Nyanko.

Over the course of the series, Luna develops a close bond with Usagi, though early on it is on uneasy terms, as Luna often upsets Usagi by giving her advice she does not want, often leading to comic results. The whole Tsukino family adopts her as a pet, even when they are unaware of her true identity. In an anime-only storyline, Shingo Tsukino is shown to be reluctant to accept Luna at first, and his animosity is enhanced by an attack from the Dark Kingdom; however, at the end of the episode, he seems to be friendly towards her. Luna also becomes good friends with Ami. Luna and Artemis have an implied romantic relationship, which is confirmed when they meet Diana, who is their daughter from the future. During the Sailor Stars anime, Luna also develops a crush on Kou Yaten, the male civilian form of one of the Sailor Starlights.

== Aspects and forms ==
Even when Luna does not have as many incarnations and special powers as the Sailor Guardians and Tuxedo Mask, she nonetheless manages to get some transformations, as well as a long lifetime virtually spanned between the Silver Millennium era and the 30th century.

=== Human form ===
Luna in her human form, as drawn by Naoko Takeuchi

The character is first shown to get the ability to transform into a human being in the manga special The Lover of Princess Kaguya, which was released a month after the end of the third arc of the series. In this side story, Luna falls in love with a human named Kakeru. It is stated that Kakeru's wish is to meet Princess Kaguya someday. During the climax of the story, Sailor Moon uses the Silver Crystal to transform Luna into a human woman. At first, Kakeru thinks this woman is Kaguya, but then he notices Luna's crescent moon mark in her forehead and realizes it is her. This side story was adapted into Sailor Moon S: The Movie, which marks Luna's only transformation into a human in the original anime adaptation.

Luna's human form appears in the main story timeline in the climax of the Dream arc, after Queen Nehelenia's defeat, alongside Artemis and Diana, who also appear in their human forms. The three of them appear once more as humans in the final arc, when Tin Nyanko attacks them.

In Sailor Moon Crystal, the new anime adaptation, Luna's human form appears earlier during the climactic battle against Queen Metalia, in which Artemis spots her praying on the Moon in this form.

=== Sailor Luna ===
In Act 27 of the live-action series, Luna gains the ability to turn into a young human girl, given the name Luna Tsukino (月野 ルナ, Tsukino Runa), and is able to transform into Sailor Luna (セーラールナ, Sērā Runa), the "Guardian of Love and Small Things." Her uniform is colored in yellow and purple, along with purple boots with white fur atop of them as well as in the sleeves, a jingle bell instead of a brooch, and a cat ear motif in her dark blue hair. Luna's personality as a human girl is essentially identical to her normal self, except that she has a mild obsession with sweet foods and behaves more like a real cat, in that she runs from dogs and is easily distracted by toys. She also has heightened hearing and is able to move extremely quickly. Luna involuntarily transforms back into a plushie under certain circumstances such as sneezing, taking a direct attack from an enemy, or falling unconscious.

In the Special Act epilogue, Luna is the only one of the Guardians who is still able to transform without outside assistance. She is also shown living mainly as a human with Usagi's family, with whom she gets along quite well, though she still takes on her cat form when necessary. She is also shown to have taken on some of the personality traits of Usagi and her mother, such as acting in the same melodramatic manner when waking up in the morning.

== Special powers and items ==
Luna's most distinctive power is her ability to talk like and communicate with human beings. This trait is only shared by Artemis and their daughter Diana. In all versions of the series, Luna provides the Sailor Guardians with many of their special items, particularly early on. The items always spring into existence, seemingly out of thin air, and it is unclear whether she is creating them herself or simply transporting them from some other location. Luna is also shown to be capable of handling machines, as shown when she accesses a secret laboratory below Game Center Crown, or an arcade machine in the original anime adaptation. The first time Luna manages to transform into a human is thanks to the power of the Silver Crystal; however, in subsequent appearances, she transforms by herself. Human Luna gains additional powers such as the ability to fly, to teleport herself and others, and is even capable of surviving in the vacuum of space. Luna loses all of these powers if the crescent moon mark on her forehead is hit by an attack, as shown when she, Artemis, and Diana are struck by Tin Nyanko, which renders them as normal cats. It is also stated by Princess Kakyuu in the final arc that Luna's Star Seed is almost as powerful as a Sailor Crystal.

In the live-action series, Luna uses a special cell phone named Lunatia L to transform into Sailor Luna, by dialing 6-7-2 and shouting "Luna Prism Power, Make up!". In this form, she uses a special attack called Luna Sucre Candy which bombards an enemy in exploding sweets. Her main weapon is the Moonlight Stick, which looks identical to Sailor Moon's Moonlight Stick from the same series and which she can transform into various other objects, such as a paper fan or a butterfly net.

== Development ==
Rina Koike as Sailor Luna in Pretty Guardian Sailor Moon. The character was designed by Naoko Takeuchi.

The concept of a talking cat guiding a schoolgirl to becoming a Sailor Guardian first occurs in Codename: Sailor V, Takeuchi's manga series that served as the basis for its successor Sailor Moon in which Artemis appears before Minako to reveal to her she has been chosen as "Sailor V" to protect Earth. When Codename: Sailor V was proposed for an anime adaptation, the story was revisioned so that it would eventually become Sailor Moon, and the talking cat role would result in Luna.

Luna has blue eyes in the manga, the live-action series, and in the Sailor Moon Eternal film, but red eyes in both anime TV series. In the Materials Collection, Takeuchi describes Luna's whiskers as long, and the character shares her page with Artemis, whom the author labels as opposite to Luna, though being her "other half". Luna and Artemis also share their page with an unused character called "Diana the Moon Fairy", whom Luna does not like very much. This character never appears in the series, but her name was given to Luna and Artemis' daughter. Though Luna's age is never discussed in any version of the series, Takeuchi states in the Materials Collection that Luna's human form appears to be a year younger than Usagi and goes on to describe her as frail, as if she had recently lost a lot of weight. The author says her hair is the same color as her cat form's fur—blackish-gray—with two odangos in either side of her head.

In the live-action series, Luna is portrayed as a stuffed toy rather than a real cat. Usually she is represented by a puppet, though CGI effects are used for complicated scenes. The character of Sailor Luna was designed by Takeuchi herself. One of the only times she appears in an outfit other than those Takeuchi designed—her Guardian uniform or her purple shirt and yellow skirt—is in the Special Act, where she serves as the flower girl at Usagi and Mamoru's wedding.

Luna's name comes from the Latin word for Earth's Moon. Luna is also the divine embodiment of the Moon in the ancient Roman religion.

=== Actresses ===
In the original anime, as well as the live-action series, Luna is voiced by Keiko Han, the same woman who voiced Queen Beryl. Her English voice actress for the entire series was Jill Frappier, who portrayed the character with an English accent, described as "fairly old, not to mention cranky and British". In the live-action series, Sailor Luna is played by Rina Koike in her debut acting role, who thought that she was going to play Chibiusa until she went in for a costume fitting. However, Chibiusa never appears in Pretty Guardian Sailor Moon. Ryō Hirohashi has voiced Luna in all media following Sailor Moon Crystal, while Michelle Ruff has portrayed the character in the English dub of this version. In the stage musicals, Luna has been portrayed by Tomoko Ishimura (1993–1994), Misato Matsumoto (2018–2019), Hiroko Wakasa (2018), Yune Sakurai (2021; cat form), and Marisa (2021; Human Form).

== Reception and influence ==
In the first official Sailor Moon character popularity poll, Luna was the eighth most popular character out of thirty eight choices. One year later, now with fifty choices, Luna was the twenty-second most popular character. Her role in the series has been compared to Rupert Giles' in Buffy the Vampire Slayer. Writer Mary Grigsby considers Luna, along with the other cat characters, to blend pre-modern ideas about feminine mystery with modern ideas such as the lucky cat. In his review of season 1 episode "Loved and Chased! Luna's Worst Day Ever", Michael Mammano from Den of Geek thought that a Luna-centric episode "would have come earlier in the show" and that very little of Luna's background is known, considering her pivotal role in the series.

In a review of Sailor Moon Crystal, Meghan Sullivan from IGN pointed that there are "weird issues" regarding Luna's role, particularly how the character "remembered being from the moon, but couldn't remember what the moon princess looks like?" However, on a review of a later act, the author praised the "growing friendship between Luna and Usagi", and how the latter defended the former when the brainwashed Mamoru attacked her. In her review of the season finale, Sullivan stated that voice actress Ryo Hirohashi "did an amazing job expressing helplessness and despair as Luna watched Metalia steamroll over everyone and everything back on Earth." In her reviews of Crystal, Gabriella Ekens from Anime News Network stated that series was "poorly animated" and that "Luna sometimes looks more like a horse than a cat." In her review of the act in which Artemis and Sailor Venus made their debut, Ekens considered that "Artemis consistently looks more like a cat than Luna, sometimes even while they're in the same shot."

=== Appearances in other media ===
Luna is featured in Nakayoshi crossover video games Nakayoshi to Issho and Welcome Nakayoshi Park. In a collaboration between Sailor Moon and Capcom as part of the 25th anniversary celebration of the Sailor Moon franchise, the Felyne cat companion assumes the form of Luna and wields Usagi's Cutie Moon Rod weapon in the Monster Hunter XX expansion of Monster Hunter Generations.

In the second episode of the first series of RuPaul's Drag Race: UK Versus the World, American contestant Mo Heart's look for the "Kitty Girl" runway theme was as Luna, which according to Andy Swift from TVLine, was among the most incredible of the week.
