= Jill Frappier =

English-Canadian voice actress

- Born: Jill Carolyn Haydon; October 7, 1944 (age 81); Romsey, Hampshire, England
- Occupation: Voice actress
- Years active: 1969–present
- Spouses: Roger Frappier (m. 1968): John J. Devlin
- Children: Jamie Haydon-Devlin (son)
- Website: http://cargocollective.com/jillfrappier/

Jill Carolyn Haydon (born October 7, 1944) is a British-Canadian voice actress.

Frappier was born in Lord Louis Mountbatten's stately home, Broadlands, in Romsey, England. She moved to Canada in 1967 to work as a British hostess at the British pavilion during the 1967 International and Universal Exposition, where she met her first husband, Roger Frappier, who was pursuing a career in directing.

She is known for voicing Luna in the DiC/Cloverway/Optimum Productions dubs of Sailor Moon, the title character in Keroppi and Friends, Mrs. Prysselius in Pippi Longstocking, Aunty in Pecola, Miss Finch in Birdz, Doucette in Anatole, and Fifi in Hello Kitty and Friends.

She has appeared on camera in television and movies such as Wind at My Back, Friday the 13th: The Series, The Dating Guy, Night Heat, TekWar, Spearfield's Daughter, The Twilight Zone, The Hitchhiker, Beyond Reality, Kim’s Convenience, The Way Home and The Jon Dore Show.

Frappier is also known for narrating a series of four part films called Imperfect Union: Canadian Labour and the Left.

She runs "Dragontrails Drama" drama classes in Toronto, Ontario.

== Filmography ==
=== Film ===
- Polar - Doris
- The Adventures of Bob & Doug McKenzie: Strange Brew - Gertrude
- Anne of Green Gables: The Continuing Story - Mrs. Dodd
- Imperfect Union: Canadian Labour and the Left - Narrator
- In Praise of Older Women - Lady Teacher
- Jacob Two-Two Meets the Hooded Fang - Mother
- Strauss: The King of 3/4 Time - The Countess
- Une nuit en Amérique - Mme. Braner
- Under the Piano - Lady 2
- Albatross - Barbara
- Home Free - Jill Homur

=== Television ===
- Beyond Reality - Barbara Lambert
- Chasing Rainbows - Mrs. Blaine
- The Dating Guy - Muff
- Friday the 13th: The Series - Mrs. Dallion
- Hangin' In - Romona, Mrs. Taylor
- The Hitchhiker - Guest Star
- The Jon Dore Show - Woman
- Night Heat - Genevieve
- Psi Factor: Chronicles of the Paranormal - Bionorm Administrator
- Spearfield's Daughter - Emma Cruze
- Street Legal - K. Samuels
- TekWar - Helen Sloan
- The Twilight Zone - Museum Patron
- Wind at My Back - Helen McCloud
- Hudson & Rex - Miranda Hudson
- Kim's Convenience – Mrs. Taylor
- The Way Home - Fern Landry

=== Animation/Anime ===
- Anatole - Doucette
- Angela Anaconda - Additional Voices
- The Amazing Spiez! - Sherry Lewis
- Bad Dog - Additional Voices
- Birdz - Miss Finch
- Bob and Margaret - Additional Voices
- Blazing Dragons - Mrs. Shambles
- The Busy World of Richard Scarry - Additional Voices
- Flash Gordon - Additional Voices
- Franklin - Mrs. Periwinkle
- Freaky Stories - Additional Voices
- The Happy Prince - Additional Voices
- Hello Kitty and Friends - Fifi (English dub)
  - Keroppi and Friends - Keroppi, Kerada ("The Frog's Secret House") (English dub)
- Jane and the Dragon - The Lady-in-Waiting
- Little Bear - Additional Voices
- Monster Force - Additional Voices
- Ned's Newt - Additional Voices
- The Neverending Story - Additional Voices
- Pecola - Aunty
- Pippi Longstocking - Mrs. Prysselius
- Rescue Heroes - Additional Voices
- Sailor Moon (DiC/Cloverway dubs) - Luna, Luna Ball (episode 58), Queen Beryl (episode 82), Kigurumiko (episode 126), Elephanko (episode 139)
  - Sailor Moon R The Movie: The Promise of the Rose (2000 Pioneer dub) - Luna
  - Sailor Moon S The Movie: Hearts in Ice (2000 Pioneer dub) - Luna (cat and human forms)
  - Sailor Moon SuperS The Movie: Black Dream Hole (2000 Pioneer dub) - Luna
- Stickin' Around - Additional Voices

=== Video games ===
- Assassin's Creed: Syndicate - Mary Anne Disraeli

| Preceded by None | Voice of Luna; 1995-2000 | Succeeded by Michelle Ruff |
