= Sailor Moon S: The Movie =

1994 film by Hiroki Shibata

- Theatrical release poster
- Japanese: 劇場版 美少女戦士セーラームーンS(スーパー)
- Literal meaning: Pretty Soldier Sailor Moon S the Movie
- Revised Hepburn: Gekijō-ban Bishōjo Senshi Sērā Mūn Sūpā
- Directed by: Hiroki Shibata
- Screenplay by: Sukehiro Tomita
- Based on: Sailor Moon by Naoko Takeuchi
- Produced by: Iriya Azuma
- Starring: Kotono Mitsuishi; Aya Hisakawa; Michie Tomizawa; Emi Shinohara; Rika Fukami; Megumi Ogata; Masako Katsuki; Chiyoko Kawashima; Keiko Han; Kae Araki; Tōru Furuya
- Cinematography: Motoi Takahashi
- Edited by: Yasuhiro Yoshikawa
- Music by: Takanori Arisawa
- Production company: Toei Animation
- Distributed by: Toei Company
- Release date: December 4, 1994
- Running time: 60 minutes
- Country: Japan
- Language: Japanese
- Box office: ¥1.05 billion

Sailor Moon S: The Movie (Note: Originally released in Japan as Pretty Soldier Sailor Moon S: The Movie (Japanese: 劇場版 美少女戦士セーラームーンS(スーパー), Hepburn: Gekijō-ban Bishōjo Senshi Sērā Mūn Sūpā), and later as Pretty Guardian Sailor Moon S: The Movie. Released in the U.S. as Sailor Moon S: The Movie – Hearts in Ice in the 2000 Pioneer Entertainment dub, and simply Sailor Moon S: The Movie in the Viz media re-dub in 2018.) is a 1994 Japanese animated superhero fantasy film directed by Hiroki Shibata and written by Sukehiro Tomita. Produced by Toei Animation and based on the Sailor Moon manga series by Naoko Takeuchi, it is the second film in the franchise, following Sailor Moon R: The Movie (1993). The film takes its name from Sailor Moon S, the third season of the anime television series, which was airing at the time.

Loosely adapting Takeuchi's manga side story The Lover of Princess Kaguya, the film follows the Sailor Guardians as they confront an extraterrestrial threat posed by the snow queen Kaguya, while Luna develops romantic feelings for a human astronomer named Kakeru. The Japanese voice cast includes Kotono Mitsuishi as Sailor Moon and Keiko Han as Luna, alongside several returning actors from the television series. The film was released theatrically in Japan on December 4, 1994, as part of the Winter '94 Toei Anime Fair.

== Plot ==
An extraterrestrial ice entity named Princess Snow Kaguya (プリンセス・スノー・カグヤ, Purinsesu Sunō Kaguya) arrives on Earth with the intention of freezing it, but a fragment of her comet has been lost and she is unable to proceed without it. She has her henchwomen, the Snow Dancers, search for the missing fragment. In Tokyo, a young astronomer named Kakeru Ōzora (宇宙 翔, Ōzora Kakeru) finds the fragment and keeps it in his observatory to study it further.

Meanwhile, the Sailor Guardians are enjoying a day in the Juban Shopping District. Luna falls ill and decides to return to Usagi Tsukino's house. Along the way, she collapses while crossing the road and is almost hit by an oncoming car, but is rescued and nursed to health by Kakeru. Luna develops romantic feelings for him, even kissing him on the cheek in his sleep, leaving Artemis crushed. Luna soon discovers that Kakeru has a girlfriend, an astronaut named Himeko Nayotake (名夜竹 姫子, Nayotake Himeko). Kakeru shows Himeko the fragment of the comet he has discovered, which he has dubbed Princess Snow Kaguya, insisting that there is a goddess living on the Moon. However, Himeko dismisses Kakeru's claims as nonsense, leading to an argument. Himeko leaves on a space mission without reconciling with Kakeru.

The comet fragment attaches itself to Kakeru's life force, slowly draining his life-force energy and causing him to become ill. Kaguya later steals the fragment, but because it is connected to Kakeru's life-force, he is brought even closer to death when Kaguya throws the fragment into the ocean and creates an enormous ice crystal that will continue to drain Kakeru's life-force energy completely. She and her Snow Dancers gradually begin freezing the entire Earth. The Sailor Guardians attempt to stop her, only for Kaguya to revive the Snow Dancers using the crystal. Before Kaguya can kill the Sailor Guardians, Sailor Moon arrives and tries to talk her out of her plot. Wanting more strength, she activates the mighty powers of the legendary Holy Grail to evolve into Super Sailor Moon, but is easily overpowered by Snow Queen Kaguya. Determined to protect the Earth and its people, Usagi prepares to activate the Legendary Silver Crystal's immense energy and power. The eight Sailor Guardians, along with Sailor Chibi Moon, combine their own strength and Sailor abilities at once to further strengthen the healing power of the Legendary Silver Crystal, destroying Snow Queen Kaguya and the Snow Dancers, and eliminating the ice crystal in the ocean, as well as her comet.

Usagi wishes for Luna to become the mythical Princess Kaguya for one night. Concerned about Himeko's safety, Kakeru wanders in the snowstorm and is saved by Luna in the same spot where Kakeru saved her, transformed into a human. She takes him near the Moon, where Himeko, on her space mission, witnesses the phenomenon and realizes that Princess Kaguya does exist. Luna encourages him to focus on his relationship with Himeko, and the two kiss. After returning to the Earth, Kakeru takes up Luna's advice and meets Himeko at the airport, where the two lovingly hug. Artemis meets up with Luna, and the cats reconcile.

== Voice cast ==
Character	Japanese voice actor	English voice actor (Pioneer/Optimum Productions, 2000)	English voice actor (Viz Media/Studiopolis, 2018)
Usagi Tsukino/Sailor Moon	Kotono Mitsuishi	Serena Tsukino	Stephanie Sheh
Usagi Tsukino/Sailor Moon	Kotono Mitsuishi	Terri Hawkes	Stephanie Sheh
Ami Mizuno/Sailor Mercury	Aya Hisakawa	Amy Anderson	Kate Higgins
Ami Mizuno/Sailor Mercury	Aya Hisakawa	Karen Bernstein	Kate Higgins
Rei Hino/Sailor Mars	Michie Tomizawa	Raye Hino	Cristina Valenzuela
Rei Hino/Sailor Mars	Michie Tomizawa	Katie Griffin	Cristina Valenzuela
Makoto Kino/Sailor Jupiter	Emi Shinohara	Lita Kino	Amanda C. Miller
Makoto Kino/Sailor Jupiter	Emi Shinohara	Susan Roman	Amanda C. Miller
Minako Aino/Sailor Venus	Rika Fukami	Mina Aino	Cherami Leigh
Minako Aino/Sailor Venus	Rika Fukami	Stephanie Morgenstern	Cherami Leigh
Mamoru Chiba/Tuxedo Mask	Tōru Furuya	Darien Shields	Robbie Daymond
Mamoru Chiba/Tuxedo Mask	Tōru Furuya	Vincent Corazza	Robbie Daymond
Usagi "Chibiusa" Tsukino/Sailor Chibi Moon	Kae Araki	Serena "Rini" Tsukino	Sandy Fox
Usagi "Chibiusa" Tsukino/Sailor Chibi Moon	Kae Araki	Tracey Hoyt	Sandy Fox
Haruka Tenoh/Sailor Uranus	Megumi Ogata	Amara Tenoh	Erica Mendez
Haruka Tenoh/Sailor Uranus	Megumi Ogata	Sarah Lafleur	Erica Mendez
Michiru Kaioh/Sailor Neptune	Masako Katsuki	Michelle Kaioh	Lauren Landa
Michiru Kaioh/Sailor Neptune	Masako Katsuki	Barbara Radecki	Lauren Landa
Setsuna Meioh/Sailor Pluto	Chiyoko Kawashima	Trista Meioh	Veronica Taylor
Setsuna Meioh/Sailor Pluto	Chiyoko Kawashima	Sabrina Grdevich	Veronica Taylor
Luna	Keiko Han	Jill Frappier	Michelle Ruff
Artemis	Yasuhiro Takato	Ron Rubin	Johnny Yong Bosch
Princess Snow Kaguya	Eiko Masuyama	Catherine Disher	Melissa Fahn
Kakeru Ōzora	Masami Kikuchi	Jeff Lumby	Chris Hackney
Himeko Nayotake	Megumi Hayashibara	Jen Gould	Eden Riegel
Snow Dancers	Mariko Onodera; Yūko Nagashima	Esther Thibault	TBA
Announcers	Tomohisa Asō; Yasunori Masutani	Tony Daniels	TBA
Journalist	Yoshiyuki Kōno	unknown	TBA

== Production ==
Sailor Moon S: The Movie is based on the 135-page manga side story "Princess Kaguya's Lover" (かぐや姫の恋人, Kaguya-hime no Koibito), written and illustrated by series creator Naoko Takeuchi and later published by Kodansha. Having left the production of Sailor Moon R: The Movie (1993) to others, Takeuchi wanted to become more directly involved in the second film. She conceived "Princess Kaguya's Lover" specifically for the project and wrote the story "all in one go".

Takeuchi had planned to introduce a human form for Luna since the beginning of the manga's serialization. Her interest in space exploration also influenced the development of the story and Luna's romantic subplot. She based the film's antagonist, Princess Snow Kaguya, on an Art Deco antique named "Salome", while the Snow Dancers were inspired by a German porcelain figure that reminded her of someone dancing in a snowstorm. As part of her research, Takeuchi visited the Kennedy Space Center in Florida on July 8, 1994, where she witnessed the launch of Space Shuttle Columbia. She later expressed satisfaction with the completed film, particularly Luna's transformation into human form.

The film was directed by Sailor Moon episode director Hiroki Shibata, while Hisashi Kagawa, Katsumi Tamegai and Shinya Hasegawa served as animation directors. Sukehiro Tomita, who had written the screenplay for the previous film, returned as screenwriter. The film was presented theatrically in a 1.85:1 aspect ratio on 35 mm film.

The film's soundtrack album, Sailor Moon S: Music Collection, was released in Japan on December 21, 1994. Composed by Takanori Arisawa, the album contains 12 tracks, including the ending theme "Moonlight Destiny" and the image song "Sailor Team no Theme", both performed by Hiroko Asakawa.

== Release ==
=== Japanese release ===
The film was released in Japanese theaters on December 4, 1994.

To promote the film's theatrical release, a special event train named the Sailor Moon S Express operated between Seibu-Shinjuku Station and Seibu-Yūenchi Station on November 29, 1994. Approximately 1,500 fans, selected from around 50,000 applicants, travelled aboard the train alongside members of the Japanese voice cast, with Sailor Moon actress Kotono Mitsuishi serving as conductor. A promotional event was also held at Seibuen Amusement Park, featuring cast discussions, character performances and a performance of "Moonlight Destiny" by Hiroko Asakawa.

A further promotional event, the Sailor Soldiers' Biggest Christmas Party, was held at Tokyo Bay NK Hall on December 18, 1994. The event featured appearances by the anime's voice cast, musical performances, staged scenes and a live performance by Asakawa.

An audio drama adaptation of the film, featuring the original Japanese voice cast, was released by Forte Music Entertainment on February 21, 1995. The album includes the songs "Moonlight Densetsu" and "Moonlight Destiny".

The film was released on VHS by Toei on August 21, 1995, On March 21, 2002, Toei Video included the film in the Japanese Sailor Moon DVD-BOX The Movie, alongside Sailor Moon R: The Movie and Sailor Moon SuperS: The Movie. A standalone DVD edition followed on April 21, 2005. The Blu-ray collection of the three films was released on February 7, 2018, with this film titled Pretty Guardian Sailor Moon S: The Movie.

=== European territories ===
In Germany, the film was released on VHS by Edel under the title Schneeprinzessin Kaguya.

In Poland, the film was released on VHS by Planet Manga in 1998, featuring Japanese audio and a Polish voice-over. In 2001, a DVD edition was distributed in two parts with issues of the magazine Gry Komputerowe. On 21 December 2015, Anime Eden released a further DVD edition, featuring a Polish dub, Japanese audio and Polish subtitles.

In Italy, Dynit released the film on DVD on 23 November 2011 under the title Sailor Moon S The Movie – Il cristallo del cuore, following a postponement from September. The edition included both the television and theatrical widescreen presentations.

In France, Kazé released the film on DVD on 29 April 2015, featuring a newly recorded French dub. On January 20, 2016, Kazé included the film in a French DVD box set alongside Sailor Moon R: The Movie, Sailor Moon SuperS: The Movie and the Sailor Moon SuperS television special.

=== English-speaking territories ===
The film was first released in North America on VHS by Pioneer Entertainment on August 31, 1999, in Japanese with English subtitles. Pioneer subsequently released an uncut bilingual DVD edition on May 23, 2000, alongside a VHS edition containing an edited version of the English dub. The edited version was also broadcast on YTV in Canada and on Cartoon Network's Toonami block in the United States, the latter on November 9, 2001. Pioneer re-released the DVD on January 6, 2004, under its "Geneon Signature Series" line.

The original English dub was produced by Optimum Productions, featuring several actors from the earlier DIC Entertainment adaptation reprising their roles. The edited English-language VHS version removed some nudity, language and violence, as documented in a contemporary review by Randy Pitman of Video Librarian. The edited version also featured additional music credited to Bob Summers, while the bilingual DVD presented an uncut edition of the film.

In 2014, the film was re-licensed by Viz Media for North American distribution. The company commissioned a new English dub in association with Los Angeles-based Studiopolis. The film received limited theatrical screenings in North America as a double feature with Sailor Moon R: The Movie, in association with Fathom Events. Dubbed screenings took place on July 28, 2018, followed by subtitled screenings on July 30.

On October 2, 2018, Viz Media released the film on Blu-ray and DVD in North America. The release presented the film uncut and remastered in high definition, with both the original Japanese audio and Viz Media's new English-language dub. On February 11, 2025, Viz Media re-released the film as part of the Sailor Moon: Three-Film Collection Blu-ray set, alongside Sailor Moon R: The Movie and Sailor Moon SuperS: The Movie.

In Australia and New Zealand, the film was licensed by Madman Entertainment, which released it on DVD and Blu-ray in Australia on December 5, 2018, featuring English and Japanese audio tracks. On November 3, 2021, Madman included the film in a three-film Blu-ray collection alongside Sailor Moon R: The Movie and Sailor Moon SuperS: The Movie.

== Reception ==
Animerica noted that the film incorporates aspects of the Japanese folklore The Tale of the Bamboo Cutter (竹取物語, Taketori Monogatari) and Yuki Onna (雪女; snow woman) in the antagonist's character. In July 2000, the Spanish magazine Neko described Sailor Moon S: The Movie as one of the best films in the franchise, highlighting its storyline involving Luna's romantic feelings for Kakeru and his fascination with Princess Kaguya.

In a retrospective review of the 2018 Blu-ray release, Michael S. Mammano of Den of Geek awarded the film 2.5 out of 5 stars. He praised its visuals and action sequences and noted that the film unusually places Luna at the centre of the story, giving greater depth to a character who generally serves a supporting role in the television series. He was more critical of Princess Snow Kaguya's storyline, regarding it as comparatively underdeveloped.

=== Commercial performance ===
The theatrical programme comprising Sailor Moon S: The Movie, Aoki Densetsu Shoot! and Oowaga Super Baby earned ¥1.05 billion in distributor rentals in Japan.

== Legacy ==
Sailor Moon S: The Movie has retained a prominent reputation among fans of the franchise. In 2020, it ranked sixth in the favorite episode category of NHK's All Sailor Moon Anime Grand Poll, which included episodes and films from across the animated franchise. It was the second-highest-ranked theatrical film, behind Sailor Moon R: The Movie, which placed first.

== See also ==
- The Snow Queen
