= Jun Masuo =

Japanese actor

Jun Masuo (増尾 遵, Masuo Jun; born October 5, 1986) is a Japanese actor best known for his role as Jadeite in Pretty Guardian Sailor Moon. Jun has also worked as a model. Nowadays he plays with the music group "As a Sign of human", as guitarist/vocalist.

== Profile ==
- Birth date: October 5, 1986 (age 39)
- Hometown: Tokyo, Japan
- Talent agency: Office Watanabe

== Filmography ==
- 1998: "Young Gamu Takayama" from Ultraman Gaia
- 1999: Booska! Booska!!
- 2001: "Fujisaki Tatuya" from Heart
- 2003-2004: "Jadeite" from Pretty Guardian Sailor Moon
- 2004: Tokusou Sentai Dekaranger 45th story
