= Keiko Han =

Japanese actress (born 1953)

- 潘 恵子
- Born: April 5, 1953 (age 73); Shinbashi, Minato, Tokyo, Japan
- Other names: Han-san (潘さん); Īpin (イーピン)
- Education: Toyo Eiwa Jogakuin University; Nihon University
- Occupations: Actress; voice actress; Western astrologer
- Years active: 1977–present
- Employer: Just Production Inc.
- Notable credits: Mobile Suit Gundam as Lalah Sune; Saint Seiya as Saori Kido; Goldfish Warning! as Yurika Sugadaira; Sailor Moon as Luna and Queen Beryl
- Spouse: 1
- Children: Megumi Han
- Website: Official profile

Keiko Han (潘 恵子, Han Keiko; born April 5, 1953) is a Japanese actress and voice actress. She performed the theme songs in productions such as Story of the Alps: My Annette and The Swiss Family Robinson: Flone of the Mysterious Island. She is also a fortune teller of western horoscopes, having written books on the subject. She is currently affiliated with Just Production Inc., having been previously affiliated with Aoni Production and 81 Produce.

She is most known for her roles as Lalah Sune in Mobile Suit Gundam, Saori Kido in Saint Seiya, Yurika Sugadaira in Goldfish Warning! and Luna and Queen Beryl in Sailor Moon.

Her daughter Megumi is also a voice actress.

== Personal life ==
Born in Tokyo, she graduated from Toyo Eiwa Jogakuin University and Nihon University College of Arts and Future Theater. Han is the daughter of a Taiwanese father. She has performed with Kenji Utsumi's troupe. She was invited by Utsumi and his wife Michiko Nomura to work as a voice actress for film and television.

== Career ==
At the time of the appearance of Mobile Suit Gundam, she saw eight Broadway performances during a week-long stay in New York, which had a great impact on her voice acting. Kenji Utsumi and Ryōko Kinomiya are called parenting parents.

As a voice actress, she worked as a singer and on theme songs, especially known as "the World Masterpiece Theater" series. In this series, she, Eiko Yamada and Mitsuko Horie are recurring voice actresses. She appeared in quiz shows and TV dramas. In the early 1980s, female voice actors frequently won first place in popularity polls.

She worked as a western astrologer and authored many books. She serialized the horoscope section in Animage under the pseudonym Ban Kyoran. Currently, the astrology section (Lalah's Astrology Fortune Telling) is published in the Gundam Ace magazine, and in the anime, she is responsible for the fortune telling of Katekyō Hitman Reborn!. She began her fortune-telling when she became interested in the story of astrologer Tomoaki Nagare, whom she had met before, and began to study it. Less than a year after joining the disciple, she commenced writing a book with him.

== Filmography ==
=== Television animation ===
List of voice performances in television animation
Year	Title	Role	Notes	Source
1977–89	Sazae-san	Mitsuko Hama, Ukie Isasaka, Hayakawa	Debut television anime voice role; First voice of Ukie Isasaka	
1977	Superhuman Squadron Barattack	Yuri		
1977	Paul's Miraculous Adventure	Rippī		
1977	I'm Teppei	Momoe Uesugi		
1977	Yatterman	Ann		
1977	Her Majesty's Petite Angie	Angie Airinton		
1978	Ikkyū-san	Kōta (Dochite Bōya)		
1979	Mobile Suit Gundam	Lalah Sune, Icelina Eschonbach		
1979	Entaku no Kishi Monogatari: Moero Arthur	Lady Guinevere		
1979	Mirai Robo Daltanious	Sanae Shiratori		
1980	The Adventures of Tom Sawyer	Becky Thatcher		
1980	Ganbare Genki	Tomoko Ishida		
1980	Invincible Robo Trider G7	Ikue Sunabara		
1981	Queen Millennia	Yayoi Yukino		
1981	Dr. Slump & Arale-chan	Drampire		
1981	Wakakusa Monogatari Yori Wakakusa no Yon Shimai	Elizabeth March (Beth)		
1982	Kikou Kantai Dairugger XV	Patty Ellington		
1983	Eagle Sam	Canary Carina		
1983	Story of the Alps: My Annette	Annette Burnier		
1984	Video Senshi Laserion	Olivia Lawrence		
1985	Dancouga – Super Beast Machine God	Annette Hauser		
1986	Saint Seiya	Athena, Saori		
1987	Ai no Wakakusa Monogatari	Margaret "Meg" March		
1987	City Hunter	Atsuko Kawada	Ep. 12	
1989	Parasol Henbe	Kawai		
1989	Let's Go! Anpanman	Yuki Konkon, Kashiwamochiman, Kazemaru, Sugar Boy, Shabondaman, Princess Ocarina, Oshiruko-chan, Ramen Tenshi, Princess Flower, Yokan Madam	First voice of Yuki Konkon, Sugar Boy, Princess Ocarina, Oshiruko-chan, Princess Flower, Second voice of Shabondaman and Ramen Tenshi, Substitute voice of Yokan Madam	
1991	Goldfish Warning!	Yurika Sugadaira		
1991	Mischievous Twins: The Tales of St. Clare's	Winnifred		
1992	Pretty Soldier Sailor Moon	Luna and Queen Beryl		
1993	Little Women II: Jo's Boys	Margaret "Meg" Brooke (née March)		
1993	Pretty Soldier Sailor Moon R	Luna		
1993	Doraemon	Queen Ant	Spring 1993 television special	
1994	Pretty Soldier Sailor Moon S	Luna		
1995	Pretty Soldier Sailor Moon SuperS	Luna		
1995	Bonobono	Araiguma-kun's mother		
1996	Great Detective Conan	Megumi		
1996	Pretty Soldier Sailor Moon Stars	Luna		
1997–2000	The Kindaichi Case Files			
1999	Pocket Monsters: Episode Orange Archipelago	Dr. Uchikido		
2000	Mushrambo	Rusephine		
2002	Mirmo!	Chirumu		
2005	Air	Yamomo Priestess		
2005	Fushigiboshi no Futagohime	Moon Maria		
2011	Hunter × Hunter	Mito Freecss		
2014	The World is Still Beautiful	Sheila		
2014	Space Dandy	Pup	Ep. 8	
2019	Cautious Hero: The Hero Is Overpowered but Overly Cautious	Ishista		
2021	One Piece	Toki Kōzuki		
2025	Mobile Suit Gundam GQuuuuuuX	Lalah Sune	Final episode only	

Unknown date

- Galaxy Express 999 (Boshin Yuki)
- Koguma no Mīsha (Natasha)
- Sergeant Keroro (Keroro Boss, Kappa)
- Space Battleship Yamato III (Ruda Sharubāto)
- Ultraman Kids no Kotowaza Monogatari (Piko)
- Video Senshi Resarion (Olivia)

=== Anime films ===
List of voice performances in anime films
Year	Title	Role	Notes	Source
1979	Heidi, Girl of the Alps	Clara		
1980	Be Forever Yamato	Sasha		
1981	Uchu Senshi Baldios	Jimmy Hoshino		
1982	Mobile Suit Gundam III: Encounters in Space	Lalah Sune		
1983	Harmageddon	Junko Sawakawa		
1984	Locke the Superman	Jessica		
1985	Doraemon: Nobita's Little Star Wars	Papi		
1985	The Legend of the Gold of Babylon	Jinjao		
1988	Mobile Suit Gundam: Char's Counterattack	Lalah Sune		
1993	Legend of the Galactic Heroes: Overture to a New Year	Annerose von Grunewald		
1993	Pretty Soldier Sailor Moon R The Movie	Luna		
1994	Pretty Soldier Sailor Moon S The Movie	Luna		
1995	The 9 Sailor Soldiers Get Together! Miracle in the Black Dream Hole!	Luna		
1999	Pocket Monsters the Movie - Mirage Pokémon: Lugia's Explosive Birth	Dr. Uchikido		
2004	Doraemon: Nobita in the Wan-Nyan Spacetime Odyssey	Hachi's mother		
2005	Air	Yamano priestess		

=== Original video animation ===
- Prefectural Earth Defense Force (1986) (Miyuki Ōyama)
- Legend of the Galactic Heroes (1988) (Annerose von Grünewald)
- Teito Monogatari (1991) (Yukari Tatsumiya)
- Saint Seiya series (2002) (Athena, Saori)
- Mobile Suit Gundam Unicorn: Episode 7: Over the Rainbow (2014) (Lalah Sune)

=== Video games ===
- Double Dragon (1995) (Rebecca Brielle)
- Granblue Fantasy (Robomi)
- Langrisser I & II - Der Langrisser (xxxx) (Jessica)
- Marvel: Ultimate Alliance (xxxx) (Jessica Drew/Spider-Woman)
- Marvel: Ultimate Alliance 2 (xxxx) (Jessica Drew/Spider-Woman)
- Next King: Ai no Sennen Ōkoku (xxxx) (Marein Furakkusu)
- Project Justice (2000) (Yurika Kirishima)
- Saint Seiya series (xxxx-) (Athena, Saori)
- Tengai Makyou II: Manjimaru (xxxx) (Princess Hamaguri, Jakōin Matsumushi)
- Tenkajin (xxxx) (Kichō)
- World of Final Fantasy (2016) (Plumed Knight, Lusse)

=== Dubbing roles ===
==== Live-action ====
- Airwolf (season 4) (Jo Santini (Michele Scarabelli))
- The Blue Lagoon (1983 TBS edition) (Emmeline Lestrange (Brooke Shields))
- The Cannonball Run (1987 TV Asashi edition) (Marcie (Adrienne Barbeau))
- Carrie (1976) (1980 TBS edition) (Carrie White (Sissy Spacek))
- Carrie (2013) (Margaret White (Julianne Moore))
- Casablanca (New Era Movies edition) (Ilsa Lund (Ingrid Bergman))
- Castle Rock (Ruth Deaver (Sissy Spacek))
- Dallas (Lucy Ewing Cooper (Charlene Tilton))
- ER (season 3-10) (Nurse Connie Oligario (Conni Marie Brazelton))
- Knight Rider (April Curtis (Rebecca Holden))
- La Boum 2 (Vic Beretton (Sophie Marceau))
- Where the Heart Is (Thelma "Sister" Husband (Stockard Channing))
- White Men Can't Jump (Gloria Clemente (Rosie Perez))

=== Other voice over work ===
- Moero!! Robokon (1999) (Robopī)
- Pretty Guardian Sailor Moon (2003) (Luna, cat-form)
- Mahou Sentai Magiranger (2005) (Heavenly Saint Snowgel)
- Juken Sentai Gekiranger (2007) (Genju Pixie-Fist Hiso)

== CD ==
- Crest of the Royal Family - Part. 1 (Carol)
- Star Wars Story (Leia Organa)
- CD Theater DragonQuest series (I-III Rubisu, IV Rosary)
- Kishiwada-hakase no Kagakuteki Aijou (Miss Mellon)

== Books ==
Cover of Haha to Ko no Aishō Hoshi Uranai: Happy Ko Sodate Guide by Keiko Han

- Hoshizora no Yume (星空のゆめ), ISBN 4-257-60003-9, Asahi Sonorama, 2000
- Aijō Hoshi Uranai: Aishō no Ii Seiza o Miwakeruho (愛情星占い 相性のいい星座を見わける法), ISBN 4-04-153401-1, Kadokawa Shoten, 2000
- Haha to Ko no Aishō Hoshi Uranai: Happy Ko Sodate Guide (母と子の相性星うらない ハッピー子育てガイド), ISBN 4-09-310123-X, Shogakukan, March 1999
- Hello Kitty no Best Partner Hoshi Uranai Hoshi Uranai de Happy ni Naru (ハローキティのベスト・パートナー星占い 星占いでHappyになる), ISBN 4-387-99097-X, Sanrio, December 1999
- Hello Kitty no Eto: Horo Uranai: Jūnishi x Horoscope (ハローキティのえと ホロ占い 十二支×ホロスコープ), ISBN 4-387-00056-2, Sanrio, September 2000

=== Photo books ===
- Han Keiko
- Han Tastic
- Who Saw the Wind?
- Tangram

== Other works ==
- The History of Yokosuka City Waterways (横須賀市水道の歴史, Yokosuka-shi Suidō no Rekishi) (PR video)
