= Miyuu Sawai =

Japanese actress and model (born 1987)

- 沢井 美優
- Born: October 23, 1987 (age 38); Yokohama, Kanagawa, Japan
- Occupations: Actress; model
- Years active: 2002–present
- Agent: BOX Corporation
- Known for: Sailor Moon live-action series as Usagi Tsukino/Sailor Moon
- Spouse: Hiroyuki Takagishi (m. 2022; div. 2026)
- Children: 1

Miyuu Sawai (沢井 美優, Sawai Miyū; born October 23, 1987) is a Japanese actress and model. Her best-known role was Usagi Tsukino/Sailor Moon in the live-action adaptation of Sailor Moon which ran from 2003 to 2004.

== Personal life ==
Sawai was born in Kanagawa Prefecture on October 23, 1987. She announced that she had married comedian Hiroyuki Takagishi.

On November 14, 2024, she gave birth to her first child. The couple announced their divorce on July 30, 2026.

== Modeling career ==
=== Photobooks ===
- 2002: Miyu - ISBN 4847027345
- 2004: Kiss - ISBN 489829782X
- 2005: Miyu - ISBN 4775600834
- 2008: Present: Purezon - ISBN 978-4777109425
- 2013: Hitotoki - ISBN 484704522X

=== Idol DVDs ===
- 2002: Me
- 2002: You
- 2004: Kiss
- 2005: South Wind
- 2005: Perfect Collection
- 2005: Me→You
- 2006: Snow White
- 2006: Fresh:Re:Fresh
- 2008: Sawai Ryu

=== Digital photo and movie works ===
- 2011: Colors: 3 ri no Sawai Miyu

== Filmography ==
=== Television ===
- Pretty Guardian Sailor Moon (2003–04), Usagi Tsukino
- Kids Wars 5 (2005), Yoko Kimura
- Kamen Rider Wizard (2013), Aya Yamamoto (episodes 47, 48, 51)
- Kamen Rider Amazons (2016), Mika (episodes 9, 12)
- Kamen Rider Ex-Aid (2017), Tōko Suzuki (episodes 42–44)
- Kishiryu Sentai Ryusoulger (2019), Master Pink
- The Sunflower Disappeared in the Rain (2022), Tae Asami

=== Film ===
- A Chain of Cursed Murders (2005), Saki
- Shaolin Girl (2008), Kanagawa Miyuu
- Kamen Rider × Kamen Rider W & Decade: Movie War 2010 (2010), Erika Mutsuki
- Space Battleship Yamato (2010), Higashida

=== Anime ===
- Fullmetal Alchemist: Conqueror of Shamballa (2005), Noah
- Black Cat (2006), Reira/Layla
- GR: Giant Robo (2007), V
