= Mew Azama =

Japanese actress and model (born 1986)

- 安座間 美優
- Born: December 26, 1986 (age 39); Hiroshima, Japan
- Other name: Mew
- Occupations: Model and actress
- Years active: 2002-present
- Height: 1.69 m (5 ft 7 in)
- Spouse: Unknown (m. 2023)
- Children: 1
- Website: http://ameblo.jp/mewazama/

Mew Azama (安座間 美優, Azama Myū) (born December 26, 1986) is a Japanese model and actress. Azama signs her name "Mew" using romaji characters. She explains it in her profile: "美優 is read Mew. I was named from Kyōko Koizumi's famous song 'MEW of dawn'. So, the inscription is MEW."

== Biography ==
=== History ===
Azama was born December 26, 1986, in Hiroshima Prefecture and raised in Okinawa Prefecture. Azama is a graduate of the Okinawa Actor's School and was a member of B. B. Waves (or Baby Waves) while she was there before graduating from the group in 2000. She became "Miss SEVENTEEN" in October 2002 and was an exclusive model for Seventeen magazine until graduating from that magazine in 2006.

Her first internationally noticed role was as Makoto Kino / Sailor Jupiter in the live-action series Pretty Guardian Sailor Moon. Her co-stars thought of her as highly girlish and demure, the opposite of her forthright and tomboyish character. Before PGSM, she played a lead role in a video for Echiura's song "Taisetsu na omoide".

In October 2006, she won the 38th "non-no model grand prix" from a pool of 5000 applicants. From December 2006 to December 2007, she was an exclusive model for the magazine, and then moved to another mainstream fashion magazine, CanCam.

On March 3, 2007, she performed at the 4th "Tokyo girls collection 2007 Spring/Summer" as one of the top 70 models in Japan.

On April 24, 2007, she became "JTA (Japan Trans Ocean Air) image girl in 2007."

Since April 2007, she has been performing on the information television program for women Omo-San. As of 2012 she is a model for Can-Cam.

On September 18, 2023, she announced her marriage through Instagram. On June 24, 2025, she gave birth to her first child, a baby boy.

== Works ==
=== Magazines ===
- 2014–2016: AneCan
- 2007–2014: CanCam
- 2006–2007: Non-no
- 2002–2006: Seventeen

=== Television ===
- 2007: Omo☆san – TV Asahi
- 2008–2011: Zūmuin!! Satadē – Otenki to `Ani ★ suta' no kōnā tantō "Burosā"- NTV
- 2012: Burosā – TV Asahi
- 2012-today: News Clear – TBS News Bird

=== Dramas ===
- 2003–2004: Pretty Guardian Sailor Moon: Makoto Kino / Sailor Jupiter- TBS
- 2006: Gachibaka!: Ushijima Rie – TBS
- 2006: Children: O o-tachi ka – WOWOW
- 2006: Damenzuu o 〜ka〜: guest appearance - TV Asahi
- 2008: Salaryman Kintarō: Iwashita Megumi – TV Asahi
- 2013: Doubles〜 futari no keiji: Masumoto – TV Asahi
- 2013: Keishichō sōsaikka 9 kakari Season 8: Hyakutake Towako – TV Asahi
- 2017: Hito wa Mitame ga 100 percent: Kawai Keiko – Fuji TV
- 2020: Kiso 235: Sano Arisa – TV Tokyo

=== Film ===
- 2021: The Pledge to Megumi, Yaeko Taguchi

=== Music Videos ===
- 2005: Taisetsu na omoide – Echiura
- 2006: Aozora Pedal – Arashi
- 2010: moonlight/Sky High/YAY – moumoon (with CanCam model Maikawa Aiku, Yamamoto Mizuki and Tsuchiya Hazuki)

=== Anime ===
- 2011: Heugemono Children's role – NHK BS Premium
- 2012: Tokyo jōkyū date #15 Shonan – TVAsahi

=== Manga ===
- Hajikete B. B. (Imai yasue)
