= Sailor Jupiter =

Character from Sailor Moon

- Sailor Moon character
- Makoto in her Super Sailor Jupiter form as seen in Season 4 of the 1990s anime
- First appearance: Sailor Moon chapter #5, "Makoto – Sailor Jupiter" (1992)
- Created by: Naoko Takeuchi
- Voiced by: Japanese: Emi Shinohara; Ami Koshimizu (Sailor Moon Crystal); English: Amanda C. Miller (Viz dub); Susan Roman (DiC, Pioneer, Optimum and CWi dub)
- Portrayed by: Mew Azama
- Birthday: December 5

In-universe information
- Full name: Makoto Kino
- Alias: Princess Jupiter
- Nickname: Mako
- Family: Mr. Kino (father; deceased); Mrs. Kino (mother; deceased)
- Children: Mako Kino (daughter; "Parallel Sailor Moon" only)
- Nationality: Japanese
- Affiliations: Sailor Guardians; Shadow Galactica (manga and Sailor Moon Crystal)
- Powers and abilities: Electrokinesis; Plant manipulation Superhuman strength

Makoto Kino (Japanese: 木野 まこと, Hepburn: Kino Makoto; renamed "Lita Kino" in some English adaptations), better known as Sailor Jupiter (Japanese: セーラージュピター, Hepburn: Sērā Jupitā), is a fictional character in the Sailor Moon manga series created by Naoko Takeuchi. Makoto is her sailor form's alternative human identity as part of the Sailor Guardians, female supernatural fighters who protect the Solar System from evil.

In the series, Makoto is the third Sailor Guardian to be discovered by Usagi Tsukino, and serves as the "coordinator" of the group, as she possesses superhuman strength, as well as powers associated with electricity and plants.

Aside from the main body of the Sailor Moon series, Makoto features in her own manga short story, The Melancholy of Mako-chan. A number of image songs mentioning her character have been released as well, including the contents of three different CD singles.

== Profile ==
Makoto's strong, independent personality is hinted at in her most striking physical feature—her unusual height (5 ft 5 in (1.65 m)). She is stated at her first appearance in the series to be very tall, being the tallest Sailor Guardian, and considerable notice is taken in the original Japanese versions. Her height is downplayed in English translations as her relative height is not all that uncommon in most Europeans. She's also physically strong, and she was rumored to have been kicked out of her previous school for taking part in a brawl. She is introduced to the series after transferring to Azabu Jūban Junior High, where Usagi Tsukino and Ami Mizuno are students, and where she stands out all the more because her school uniform is different from everyone else's; unable to find anything in her size, her school's administration tells her to wear her old one. It has a long skirt, which when coupled with her hair, was a common visual cue for a tough or delinquent girl at the time the series was created. However, unlike these delinquent girls, her reddish, wavy hair is natural. Despite her tough appearance, she is very gentle. She always wears pink rose earrings and a green hair tie that decorates her ponytail.

Makoto in her school uniform, drawn by Naoko Takeuchi

One of the most consistent characters across the many versions of the series, Makoto is always depicted as simultaneously the most masculine and the most feminine of the four Sailor Guardians. Her most closely held dream is to get married and own a cake and flower shop. After entering high school, she also joins the cooking and gardening clubs.

Her domestic talents are explained as a deliberate effort to overcome her tomboyishness. In the live-action series she enjoys shopping, but eschews "girly" things (she can be seen shopping for basketball shoes in one scene, for instance); she cooks, but also physically overpowers delinquents; she reorganizes her home, but does so with a sledgehammer. She also excels in dancing, especially ice skating. She insists that she is not the least bit feminine, and seems surprised and touched when someone tells her she is.

This dual nature comes from a need to be self-sufficient: her parents died in an aviation accident as a child and she has since then looked after herself. She is self-sufficient almost to a fault, and gets shocked when an airplane passes overhead. In the anime adaptation, Makoto lives alone. In Pretty Guardian Sailor Moon, Makoto's parents' death is told in a flashback in Act 6, but how they died is not mentioned.

Makoto has at least one former boyfriend, which is the importance of this subplot. Her senpai is mentioned only once or twice. In the anime adaptation Makoto is extremely boy-crazy, with a tendency to fall for every boy who reminds her of her senpai. Pretty Guardian Sailor Moon is an integral part of why Makoto feels she needs to be alone. In each version, there are mentions of other men who were very briefly a part of her life. Makoto is generally attracted to Motoki Furuhata, especially in the anime, but only in the live-action show do they become close. By the end of the direct-to-DVD Special Act, they are engaged to be married.

== Aspects and forms ==
As a character with different incarnations, special powers, transformations, and extended longevity; an ageless lifetime spanning the Silver Millennium era and the 30th Century, Makoto gains multiple aspects and aliases as the series progresses.

=== Sailor Jupiter ===
Makoto's Sailor Guardian identity is Sailor Jupiter. She wears a sailor suit colored in green and pink, with rose-shaped earrings in green, laced-up boots with height just above the ankles. In the manga and live-action series she has a belt carrying a small ball of potpourri. She is given specific titles throughout the various series, including "Guardian of Protection", "Herculean Jupiter", "Guardian of Thunder and Courage", and "Guardian of Caring". Her personality is no different from when she is a civilian, although certain powers are unavailable to her in that form.

In Japanese, the name for the planet Jupiter is Mokusei (木星), the first kanji meaning 'wood' and the second indicating a celestial object. Although the Roman planet-name is used, Sailor Jupiter's dominant element is wood due to this aspect of Japanese mythology. Unusually, most of her attacks are based on her secondary power, lightning, which is in reference to the Roman god Jupiter. She is by far the most skilled of the Sailor Guardians, able to lift a full-grown man above her head, even while ice skating or to stop a stone pillar from falling. In the early manga, she always has a short antenna coming from her tiara, which serves as a lightning rod; eventually this takes on the same role as in the anime, and extends upward only when she summons lightning. It does not appear in the live-action series.

Sailor Jupiter gains additional special abilities and powers, and at key points her Sailor Guardian uniform changes to reflect this. The first change takes place in Act 42 of the manga, when she obtains the Jupiter Crystal and her outfit becomes similar to that of Super Sailor Moon. She is not given a new title. A similar event is divided between Episodes 143 and 154 of the anime, and she is given the name Super Sailor Jupiter. A third form appears in Act 49 of the manga, unnamed but similar to Eternal Sailor Moon (without wings). In the official visual book for Sailor Moon Eternal, this form was named "Eternal Sailor Jupiter".

=== Princess Jupiter ===
In Silver Millennium, Sailor Jupiter was also the Princess of her home planet. She was among those given the duty of protecting Princess Serenity of the Moon Kingdom. As Princess Jupiter, she dwelt in Io Castle and wore a green gown—she appears in this form in the original manga, as well as in supplementary art. Naoko Takeuchi once drew her in the arms of Nephrite, but no further romantic link between them was established in the manga or the original anime adaptation. However, in Sailor Moon Crystal it is clearly stated that Sailor Jupiter and Nephrite were in love at the time of the Moon Kingdom. This is also established in the stage musicals, and it is implied in the Another Story video game.

== Special powers and items ==
Sailor Jupiter using Sparkling Wide Pressure in Sailor Moon Crystal

Makoto is portrayed as unusually strong for a teenage girl, but like the other Sailor Guardians, she must transform in order to gain access to her celestial powers. She transforms into a Sailor Guardian by raising a special device (pen, bracelet, wand, or crystal) into the air and shouting a special phrase, originally "Jupiter Power, Make-up!" (Note: In the DIC and Cloverway dubs, Makoto does not say 'Make up' when transforming.) As she becomes more powerful and obtains new transformation devices, this phrase changes to evoke Jupiter Star, Planet, or Crystal Power. In both anime, Sailor Jupiter's transformation sequence evolves slightly over time, whether to update the background images or to accommodate changes to her uniform or a new transformation device, but they all involve electric charges forming an atom path which encircles her body.

In the manga, Sailor Jupiter's first named attack is Flower Hurricane, which is immediately followed by calling down lightning. (Note: In the re-released edition of the manga, rather than simply calling lightning, she uses the incantation Jupiter Thunderbolt. Neither this attack nor Flower Hurricane appears in the anime, but both are used in the live-action series.) Emphasis is quickly placed upon her electric-based powers, and these are the norm in all versions of the series. Her primary attack for the first story arc and most of the second is Supreme Thunder, (Note: In the DIC dub it is variously called Jupiter Thunder Crash, Supreme Thunder Crash and Jupiter Thunderbolt Crash.) for which she calls down lightning from the sky with a tiny lightning rod that extends from the stone on her tiara (or, in the live-action series, with her leg). Sometimes, before performing the attack she would call out "My guardian Jupiter! Brew a storm! Call the clouds! Bring down the lightning!" (Note: ｢我が守護木星よ！嵐を起こせ！雲を呼べ！雷を降らせよ！｣, "Waga shugo Mokusei yo! Arashi wo okose! Kumo wo yobe! Ikazuchi wo furaseyo!") Although she channels this power, she is not immune to its effects, and can use her body to focus the electricity in a suicide move. It is upgraded twice for one-off attacks in the anime series: once to Supreme Thunder Dragon, (Note: In the DIC dub, this attack is renamed Jupiter Thunder Dragon.) and much later to Super Supreme Thunder. (Note: In the Cloverway dub, this attack is renamed Superior Sparkling Thunder.)

In the second story arc Sailor Jupiter gains Sparkling Wide Pressure, (Note: In the DIC dub, it was primarily called Jupiter Thunderclap Zap in the second season, though it usually retained its original name in the Cloverway dub.) an attack consisting of a lightning ball which, aside from a manga and Sailor Moon Crystal-only power called Jupiter Coconut Cyclone, remains her primary attack for the rest of the second story arc, all of the third, and much of the fourth. When she takes on her second Sailor Guardian form (Super Sailor Jupiter in the anime), she acquires a special item, a wreath of oak leaves, which is described in the manga as "the emblem of thunder and lightning." It appears in her hair and enables her to use Jupiter Oak Evolution.

Sailor Jupiter's earrings, large pink roses, are occasionally significant. She wears them in both her Sailor Guardian and civilian forms, and can use them as a projectile weapon if she needs to. When they first meet in the manga, Usagi thinks the roses have a nice fragrance, and late in the anime the sight of them brings her back from temporary memory loss because it reminds her of Tuxedo Mask. Much more important, in the manga, are the Jupiter Crystal and Leaves of Oak. The former is Makoto's Sailor Crystal and the source of all of her power, which becomes especially important in the fifth story arc. In the live-action series, she frequently uses unnamed electric attacks, and is given a tambourine-like weapon (the Sailor Star Tambo) by Artemis. In the final episode, the Tambo transforms into a lance.

By holding hands with the other Sailor Guardians in a circle, she can use Sailor Teleport, Sailor Planet Attack, or Sailor Planet Power Meditation. When she is controlled by Galaxia in the manga and Crystal, she teams up with the other Inner Sailor Guardians to perform Galactica Gale. She, the Inner, and Outer Guardians then perform Galactica Planet Attack.

== Development ==
Makoto is present in the original proposal for a hypothetical Codename: Sailor V anime, but her name is given as Mamoru Chino. Creator Naoko Takeuchi confirms that this character eventually became Makoto, and writes that the original concept was quite different—Makoto was not only tough, but in fact was meant to be the leader of a female gang as well as a smoker. A very similar name was later given to the series' male protagonist, Mamoru Chiba.

Sailor Jupiter's original costume design, like the others', was fully unique. It featured buckles, very long gloves, blue and yellow highlights, a bare lower torso, and a profusion of thin, dark pink ribbons—along with a face-plate and communicator. Later, Takeuchi was surprised by these sketches and stated that she did not remember drawing them. Her instructions to the animators included a note that Makoto should appear muscular, "a little meatier than normal."

The kanji of Makoto's surname translate as "tree" or "wood" or "spirit" (木, ki) and "field" or "civilian" (野, no). The Japanese word for Jupiter is 木星, which literally translates as "wood planet," and is referenced in her last name. Her given name is in hiragana makoto (まこと) and therefore difficult to translate. Possible meanings include "truth", "fidelity", and "sincerity". The given name "Makoto," however, is a unisex name usually given to boys, but is sometimes given to girls; its use here highlights Makoto's tomboyishness.

=== Actresses ===
In the original Japanese series, Makoto is voiced by Emi Shinohara in the original series, and by Ami Koshimizu in Sailor Moon Crystal and all media since.

In the DIC/Cloverway English adaptation, her name was changed to "Lita" and was voiced by Susan Roman. In the Viz Media English adaptation, her voice is supplied by Amanda C. Miller.

In the stage musicals, Makoto has been portrayed by 22 actresses: Noriko Kamiyama, Marie Sada, Takako Inayoshi, Emika Satoh, Akari Tonegawa, Chiho Oyama (whose older sister Anza was the first to play Sailor Moon), Emi Kuriyama, Yuriko Hayashi, Ayano Sugimoto, Kaori Sakata, Karina Okada (Although she appears as her and sings with the others in the event promoting the musical she was not the one who played her in the actual musical performances), Mai Watanabe, Yu Takahashi, Kaede., Ami Noujo, Minami Umezawa, Kie Obana, Kanna Matsuzaki, Shio Yamazaki, Junna Ito, Kisara Matsumura, Mao Ioki, and Nao Tomisato.

In Pretty Guardian Sailor Moon, Makoto is played by Mew Azama. Also, child actress Misho Narumi portrays Makoto in flashbacks, dream sequences, and childhood photos.

== Reception and influence ==
The official Sailor Moon character popularity polls listed Makoto Kino and Sailor Jupiter as separate entities. In 1992, readers ranked them at eleventh and fifth respectively, out of thirty eight choices. One year later, now with fifty choices, Jupiter dropped to the eleventh most popular while Makoto was twelfth most popular. In 1994, with fifty one choices, Sailor Jupiter was the seventeenth most popular character and Makoto was eighteenth. In early 1996, with fifty one choices, Makoto was the twenty third most popular character and Jupiter was the twenty seventh.

A five-book series was published, one book on each of the Sailor Guardians and Sailor Moon. Makoto's was released in 1996. This book was later translated into English by Mixx.

== See also ==
- Jupiter in fiction
- Jupiter (mythology)
- Zeus
- Thor
