= Warriors of Legend =

2005 book by Navok and Rudranath

Warriors of Legend: Reflections of Japan in Sailor Moon (Unauthorized)
- Author: Jay Navok; Sushil K. Rudranath
- Cover artist: Sushil K. Rudranath
- Language: English
- Series: Warriors of Legend
- Genre: Reference book
- Publisher: Booksurge Publishing
- Publication date: July 13, 2005
- Publication place: United States
- Media type: Print
- Pages: 148 p.
- ISBN: 1-4196-0814-2
- OCLC: 61255404

Warriors of Legend is a series of books that was to be published by Genvid L.L.C, but only one book in the series, Warriors of Legend: Reflections of Japan in Sailor Moon (Unauthorized) was released.

== Reflections of Japan ==
The first, and as yet only released, book in the series. It is intended as a guide for fans of the Sailor Moon franchise to learn facts about Japan and in particular about the Azabu Jūban district of the Minato Ward of Tokyo in which the series is set. It both focuses on the landmarks of Azabu Jūban and the surrounding area as well as touching on aspects of the Culture of Japan which are apparent in the series but that may be missed by the eyes of westerners - for example Sailor Jupiter's height making her a target for bullying or "ijime". It also touches on the non-Japanese aspects of the show, for example the latter section of the book contains a comparison between Sailor Venus and the goddess Ishtar.

=== Reviews and anime community reception ===
The book has been reviewed by Neo, a United Kingdom-based "Asian Entertainment" magazine, which gave it four out of five stars and where it was one of the "Hot Picks" of the issue. Its publishing was covered by several anime and popular news sites, including ICv2 (where it was lead article), Ain't It Cool News, Anime News Network, Animation Insider, and Akadot. It was also given a brief mention at Websnark after the news of Tokyopop's rights to the Sailor Moon manga lapsing broke.

While the book's reception was largely positive there were some complaints lodged on Sailor Moon internet forums and by other members of the community alleging that Genvid was making money from the Sailor Moon franchise without paying royalties to Kodansha, Toei, and Naoko Takeuchi by publishing the book "Unauthorized". Sushil K. Rudranath replied on the Genvid LLC. website that the reason the authors chose to go unauthorized is because Toei did not give them permission to published an authorized, screen shot illustrated work and that the publishers they had approached had turned them down due to the belief that a Sailor Moon based product would not sell, which is why they chose a self-published route.

== Warriors of Legend Tour of Tokyo ==
Genvid organized a one-off tour of Tokyo from June 27-early morning June 30, 2006. This tour, though small, involving only ten tourists, was mentioned on both Anime News Network and on the Japanese website AnimeAnime. The tour consisted of visiting landmarks and sites covered in the book as well as a stay in the Mielparque Hall hotel in Tokyo, which was the location the headquarters of the Dark Agency in Codename wa Sailor V.
