= Ayaka Komatsu =

Japanese model, gravure idol, and actress (born 1986)

- 小松 彩夏
- Born: 23 July 1986 (age 40); Ichinoseki, Iwate, Japan
- Occupations: Actress; Gravure idol; Model
- Years active: 2002–present
- Spouse: Unknown (m. 2023)
- Children: 1

Ayaka Komatsu (Japanese: 小松 彩夏 Komatsu Ayaka; born 23 July 1986) is a Japanese model, gravure idol and actress. She was born in Ichinoseki, Iwate Prefecture.

== Biography ==
=== Modeling career ===
Her previous modeling agency is Amuse inc. She was a regular model of the now defunct Candy magazine. She also appeared in the Winter 2002-2003 "Angel Blue" fashion catalog and was on the cover of the manga Young Sunday dated April 7, 2005.

She was a member of the 2004 edition of the Japanese modeling quartet named Nittelligenic, an idol group sponsored by Nippon TV.

=== Acting career ===
She has acted in the following movies: Odoru Daisosasen The Movie 2 (her role in this film was relatively minor; she gets attacked by a vampire), Koibumi, Master of Thunder, A Perfect Day for Love Letters, Drift and Drift 2 (later released as Drift Deluxe Edition), and Boku wa Imōto ni Koi o Suru (which opened in Japan on January 20, 2007, and later in Europe under the English title My Sister, My Love).

Arguably, her best known role was as Minako Aino/Sailor V/Sailor Venus in the series Pretty Guardian Sailor Moon.

Komatsu was in the cast of a TV show called Dandori Musume ("Appointment Girls"). Her role in Dandori Musume is more comic than tragic, in contrast to her PGSM role. In 2008, she appeared in Average and in episode 7 of Aren't You a Criminal?.

She had a recurring role in the summer Fuji TV drama Buzzer Beat, reuniting with her former Sailor Moon cast member Keiko Kitagawa, who had the lead female role as well as with Tomohisa Yamashita as Komatsu made a cameo appearance on his previous drama, Kurosagi.

=== Personal life ===
During her birthday on July 23, 2023, she announced her marriage to a general man, and she would move her entertainment activities to Sendai due to her husband’s work.

On August 26, 2024, she announced on her Instagram account that she is expecting her first child. On February 2, 2025, she announced that she gave birth to her first child, a baby boy on January 28.

== Filmography ==
=== TV shows ===
Year	Title	Network	Notes
2003	Idol do	Fuji TV	
2005-2006	Premiere no Sōkutsu!!	Fuji TV	4th season
2006-2007	Koisuru Hanikami	CBC/TBS	4th assistant

=== TV drama ===
Year	Series	Role	Network	Notes
2003–2004	Pretty Guardian Sailor Moon	Aino Minako/Sailor Venus/Sailor V	CBC/TBS	First lead role
2005	One Missed Call	Odagiri Kyōko	TV Asahi	Guest appearance
2005	Tôbôsha: Kijima Jôichirô	fast food store clerk	Fuji TV	
2006	Kurosagi	Golddigger Girlfriend	TBS	Cameo appearance
2006	Ns' Aoi SP	medical ward novice nurse	Fuji TV	Guest appearance
2006	Isshou Wasurenai Monogatari "Million Films"	Nakano Ayumi	TV Asahi	Lead role
2006	Dandori Musume 〜Dance☆Drill〜 Saishū-banashi	Tadano Hikaru	Fuji TV	Lead role
2006	Senjo no Girl's Life	Kobayashi Bifuka	HDC	Lead Role
2006	Tsubasa no Oreta Tenshitachi	actress	Fuji TV	episode 3
2007	Bambino!	Minakawa Kozue	NTV	Supporting role
2007	Hataraki Man	Horita Megumi	NTV	Guest Appearance
2007	Uranaishi Tenjin	Kanae	CBC	episode 2
2007	Kohome	Yumi	Kansai TV	
2008	Average	woman customer	Fuji TV	Supporting Role/ TV movie
2008	Kimi Hannin Janai yo ne?	Noda Asuka	TV Asahi	Guest appearance
2008	Galileo Φ: episode 0	Hirahara Yoko	Fuji TV	Guest appearance/ TV movie
2008	The Naminori Restaurant	Shibata Hiroko	NTV	Guest appearance
2009	Buzzer Beat	Kanazawa Shion	Fuji TV	Supporting role
2009	Tokyo DOGS	model	Fuji TV	Guest appearance
2009	MW- mū - dai 0-shō 〜 akuma no game 〜	Okazaki Aiko	NTV	
2009	Danzetsu	Kudo Aiko	TV Asahi	
2010	853 Keiji kamo Shinnosuke	Hikawa Yui	TV Asahi	episode 5
2010	Indigo no yoru	Kinoshita Arisa	Tokai TV	episode 11-12
2010	Okashina keiji 6 - Saturday Wide Theat	Watanabe Akira	TV Asahi	
2010	Zettai Reido: Mikaiketsu Jiken Tokumei Sōsa	Sakota Mai	Fuji TV	episode 1
2010	Natsu no koi wa nijiiro ni kagayaku	Nozaki Kana	Fuji TV	
2011	Misaki Number One!	Rina	Fuji TV	
2011	Sain	Miyauchi Yuka	MBS	
2011	Short piece "Kuzu"	Okazaki Aiko	Fuji TV	
2011	Shin Keishichō Sōsaikka 9 kakari	Kurahashi Rio	TV Asahi	season 3 episode 9
2011	Mitehaikenai TV Motto Anata no Shiranai Sekai Wasurerareta yakusoku	Shuen Hitomi	BS NTV	
2011	Himitsu chōhō-in Erika	Shiraishi Risa	Yomiuri TV	episode 9
2012	Toranaide Kudasai!! Gravure Idol Ura Monogatari	Komatsu Ayaka	TV Tokyo	
2012	Kagi no Kakatta Heya	Saito Misato	Fuji TV	episode 5
2012	Tsuri keiji 3 - Monday Golden	Aoyama Miki	TBS	
2012	Odoru Daisōsasen The Last TV Salaryman keiji to saigo no nanjiken	policewoman	TV Asahi	
2012	Suiyō Mystery 9 Morimura Seiichi Suspense keiji no shōmei 4	Tokioka Mami	TV Tokyo	
2012	Kodoku no Gourmet	lonely cake shop clerk	TV Tokyo	season 2 episode 6
2012	Tokumei tantei	Hattori Yayoi	TV Asahi	episode 6
2013	Shūden baibai	Kinoshita Kozue	TBS	episode 4
2013	Ishikawa-kun	Kinoshita Arisa	NHK/NHKE	
2013	Apoyan 〜 Hashiru Kokusai Kūkō	Ishī	TBS	episode 5
2013	Last Cinderella	Rie	Fuji TV	
2014, 2016	Totsugawa Sôsahan	Saori Ebata	Fuji TV	episodes 8-10
2014	Last Doctor: Kansatsui Akita no Kenshi Hôkoku	Chiyo	TV Tokyo	episode 7
2014	Matching Love	Reona	TBS	
2015	Hanasaki Shin'ichirō wa nemurenai!	Sakura Nami	TV Tokyo	episode 7
2015	Ishitachi no Ren'ai Jijô	Yurie Sasaoka	Fuji TV	episode 2, 6 & 7
2015	Hanasaki Mai ga damatteinai	Sara	NTV	episode 7
2015	Mago senpai no iu tōri	Namiko	Fuji TV	
2015	Ganbare! White pea cheese		TV Setouchi	TV Setouchi 30th anniversary drama
2016	Good Partner: Muteki no bengoshi	Ranko Ota	TV Asahi	episodes 6-8
2016	Kazoku no Katachi	Yurie Sasaoka	TBS	episode 6
2016	Yoshiwara Uradoshin ~ shinshun Yoshiwara no taika ~	Suzune	NHK	TV movie
2017	Ishibute	Suzuhara	Wowow	Guest appearance on episode 1
2017	Otona Kōkō	Arisa Yamazaki	TV Asahi	Guest appearance on episode 1
2017	Kirawareru yûki	Yumi Yoshikawa	TBS	episode 4
2017	Kasouken no Onna	Noori Eori	TV Asahi	season 16, episode 15
2017	Sanbiki no ossan 3	Kanako Kojima (real name: Lee Jinray)	TV Tokyo	episode 8
2017	Plage		Wowow	episode 1
2018	Seigi no se	Nao Higuchi	NTV	episode 10
2019	hakui no senshi!	Yukino Fujii	NTV	
2019	Kishiryu Sentai Ryusoulger	Akari	TV Asahi	episode 39

=== Movies ===
Year	Title	Role	Notes
2003	Bayside Shakedown 2	high school girl	
2004	A Perfect Day for Love Letters	Miyashita Chiyuki	
2006	Drift / Drift 2	Ichiro Mina	
2006	Masutā Obu sandā kessen!! Fū ma Ryūko Den	Kaori	
2006	Babel	Bikini Model in TV Commercial	(uncredited)
2007	Boku wa Imōto ni Koi o Suru	Kusunoki Yuka	
2008	The Devotion of Suspect X	Hirahara Yōko	
2009	Eto	Shibushige	voice
2009	Kansen Rettō	Kashimura Kyōko	
2009	MW- Mu	Okazaki Aiko	
2009	Killer Virgin Road	Ayaka	
2010	Neck	Kaori	
2012	Ramo Trip Kohitsuji Dolly	Higo Ayumi	
2012	Bokura ga ita zenpen/ Kōhen	Yamamoto Nana	
2012	Odoru Daisōsasen: The Final - Aratanaru Kibō	Policewoman	
2012	Musashino-sen no Shimai	Munakata Shizuru	
2013	Neon cho	Yoshida Sakurako	starring
2013	Talk to the Dead	Yuri	starring
2013	Miss Zombie	Shuen Shara	
2014	Natsu zen. Owari	Yoshida Sakurako	
2014	Yokotawaru Kanojo	Momoko Matsuura	starring
2015	Bokutachi wa jôzu ni yukkuri dekinai	Someya	segment "Hanabi Kafe"
2017	Kuruibana	Asami Kamijo	segment "Cursing"
2018	The Werewolf Game: Inferno		

=== Stage ===
Year	Title	Role	Notes
2007	Unlucky Days	Miki	starring
2008	Every Little Thing		
2008	Nemurenu yoru no honky-tonk blues kanketsu-hen: Host sanjō	Mutsumi	
2009	Kagotsurube	O ichi	
2009	Light flight: kaeritai yatsura		
2010	Nemurenu yoru no 1 × 8 Requiem: Naked Police Academy	Mimura Momoko	
2011	Line	Kitano Bi kan	
2012	Ningyohime	Ningyohime	
2013	Miagereba ano Ni-Tsu to onaji sora	Takabe Sayuri	
2014	Masshirona zumen to taimu mashin	Ayame Shibamori	
2014	Naka no Hito	Karin	
2016	Sōkō Ginga Tetsudō no Yoru	Giovanni	
2018	Hoshi no Matsuri ni fuku kaze	Iwate	

== Publications ==
=== Singles ===
1. 2003: C'est la vie 〜 Watashi no naka no koi suru bubun (C'est la Vie～私の中の恋する部分: C'est la Vie ~ the Loving Part within Me)
2. 2003: Katagoshi ni Kinsei (肩越しに金星: Venus Over Your Shoulder)
3. 2004: Romance
4. 2004: Kiss!² Bang!²
5. 2004: Sayonara ~ Sweet Days (さよなら～Sweet Days: Goodbye ~ Sweet Days)
6. 2008: Happy time, Happy life

=== Albums ===
- 2003: I'll Be Here (under title Aino Minako)

=== Other Albums as Aino Minako ===
- Kirari ☆ Sailor Dream! C / w C'est la vie (11, 2003, Columbia Music Entertainment)
- (February 2004, same as above) Sailor Moon DJ Moon
- (February 2004, same as above) pack Sailor Moon Koro-chan
- (March 2004, same as above) Sailor Moon Character Song Sailor Venus Minako Aino
- (May 2004, same as above) pack Sailor Moon 2 Koro-chan
- (May 2004, same as above) Sailor Moon DJ Moon 2
- (June 2004, same as above) Sailor Moon Dear My Friend
- (July 2004, same as above) Sailor Moon DJ Moon 3
- (July 2004, same as above) pack Sailor Moon 3 Koro-chan
- Three pieces, including a mini-album (September 2004, same as above) Sailor Moon Moon Light Real Girl of Aino Minako
- Sailor Moon Song Collection (November 2004, same as above)

=== Idol DVDs ===
- 2004: Figure A Nittelegenic 2004 Komatsu Ayaka
- 2005: Megami no Chu! Nittelegenic 2004 Komatsu Ayaka
- 2005: Masaka… Komatsu Ayaka
- 2007: Sho o Suteyo, Mizugi ni Naro!
- 2007: Dream Note
- 2007: Happy ending: Dream Note II
- 2009: AYAKA
- 2009: Ayaka×Komatsu Ayaka
- 2011: Ayakafuru
- 2012: Hawaaaaaaaaaaii

=== Idol photobooks ===
- 2004: Ayaka no natsu ISBN 978-4847028229
- 2004: Nitchoku - Nittelegenic Official Photos ISBN 978-4820399209
- 2005: Summer Date ISBN 978-4847028816
- 2006: Moon Doll ISBN 978-4093721059
- 2007: Cheeeeeez ISBN 978-4847040092
- 2009: AYAKA×killer Virgin Road ISBN 978-4847041877
- 2011: Ayaka no zenbu ISBN 978-4-8470-4366-6
- 2012: Komagokochi ISBN 978-4847045042
- 2019: KOMAPHOTO [fantasy]
- 2019: KOMAPHOTO [real]
