= Sailor Mars =

Character from Sailor Moon

- Sailor Moon character
- Rei in her Super Sailor Mars form as seen in Season 4 of the 1990s anime
- First appearance: Sailor Moon chapter #3: "Rei – Sailor Mars" (1992)
- Created by: Naoko Takeuchi
- Voiced by: Japanese: Michie Tomizawa; Rina Satō (Sailor Moon Crystal); English: Katie Griffin (DiC (excluding the last 17 episodes) and CWi dubs); Emilie-Claire Barlow (last 17 episodes of DiC); Cristina Vee (Viz dub)
- Portrayed by: Keiko Kitagawa
- Birthday: April 17

In-universe information
- Full name: Rei Hino
- Aliases: Princess Mars; Mars Reiko (PGSM)
- Family: Ryuuji Hino (father); Risa Hino (mother, deceased)
- Children: Rei Hino (daughter; "Parallel Sailor Moon" only)
- Relatives: Grandpa Hino; Kengo Ibuki (cousin; anime only)
- Nationality: Japanese
- Affiliations: Sailor Guardians; Shadow Galactica (manga and Sailor Moon Crystal)
- Powers and abilities: Pyrokinesis; Psychic and spiritual powers

Rei Hino (Japanese: 火野 レイ, Hepburn: Hino Rei; renamed Raye Hino in some English adaptations), better known as Sailor Mars (Japanese: セーラーマーズ, Hepburn: Sērā Māzu), is a fictional character in the Sailor Moon manga series written and illustrated by Naoko Takeuchi. In the series, Rei is her sailor form's alternative human identity as part of the Sailor Guardians, female supernatural fighters who protect the Solar System from evil.

Rei is the second Sailor Guardian to be discovered by Usagi, following after Ami Mizuno. She possesses powers associated with fire, the Ofuda charm, and psychic clairvoyance. Aside from the main body of the Sailor Moon series, Rei is featured in two different manga short stories. The first, Casablanca Memories, is entirely about her and her past; the second, Rei and Minako's Girls School Battle, is shared with Minako Aino. A number of image songs mentioning her character have been released as well, including the contents of three different CD singles.

Takeuchi based Rei on her own personal experience as a miko. Originally designed with her own unique outfit, when Takeuchi decided to give all of the Guardians identical outfits, Rei's high heels were the only aspect that was carried over. A cold and aloof character in the manga, her personality was drastically changed in the anime adaptation at the behest of Kunihiko Ikuhara, where she became stubborn.

== Profile ==
Rei first appears as a miko at the Hikawa Shrine, and is shown to have an affinity with two crows who live there. It is revealed in the manga that as a child, the crows "told" her that their names are Phobos and Deimos (the same as Mars' two moons). In the manga, she is portrayed as imperial, ancient, conservative, old-fashioned, traditional, serious, disciplined, and practical, having contempt for men and disliking modern romantic relationships.

In the anime adaptation, Rei is a disciplined and practical person. She is also greatly interested in pop culture, and she excels at music—composing songs for a school festival. Rei and Usagi Tsukino have a very tempestuous relationship, and argue frequently. Though these arguments are usually petty, early in the series Rei attempts to usurp Usagi as the leader of Sailor Guardians. Even though Rei does become more loyal to Usagi, with slightly calmer emotions in the later seasons, she still remains somewhat more of a typical teenager than her manga counterpart. In the anime, Rei also tends to engage in long periods of antagonizing Usagi (who returns the same reaction), as a running gag in their arguments.

Rei goes to a different school from the other girls, namely T*A Private Girls School, a Catholic institution run by nuns. She herself is a practitioner of Shinto, living and working at Hikawa Shrine with her grandfather, its head priest. Her mother died when Rei was very young; her father is a famous politician who cares more about his job than about her (though in the live-action version he still tries to be involved in her life), and who only visits Rei on her birthday. She carries a certain amount of dislike towards him, especially in the live-action series, in which the character of her grandfather does not appear.

Rei in her unique school uniform, drawn by Naoko Takeuchi for the short story "Casablanca Memories"

Because of the lack of respectable males in her life, Rei harbors a generally low opinion of men. She considers them untrustworthy and seems genuinely uninterested in romance. The one exception is in a manga side-story centering on her, Casablanca Memories, which tells of Rei's friendship with her father's young secretary, Kaidou. He had been kind to her for her entire life and, in the story, she fancies herself in love with him. She is shocked when he suddenly announces his engagement to another girl and his decision to become a politician, despite having once said that he did not like what had happened to Rei's family as a result of her father's work. Proof of her feelings are further cemented when she moves to kiss Kaidou, asking why, if he wanted to marry into the profession, why not choose to marry her due to her father's political influence. In the manga, this is the only potential romance in her life; in the live-action series, nothing of the sort is ever shown, as Rei unquestionably detests boys. In the anime only, she "dates" Mamoru Chiba in the first season (though he thinks they are just friends), and occasionally seems open to a relationship with Yūichirō Kumada, her grandfather's pupil. In one episode, on the brink of death, she states that she wished she had kissed Yūichirō before leaving. In the original anime, she states in episode 152 that she dreams of one day getting married.

Later on, members of the Dead Moon Circus harass Rei with a reflection of her young self, which mocks her for her friendships and her dream of being a priestess. The reflection tells her that the only way for her to be happy is to try her luck with numerous men until she ends up married to someone rich. Rei is able to defeat this illusion, and in the process gains her Sailor Crystal along with the memory that, long ago, she had in fact made a vow of chastity to Princess Serenity. After this realization, she is never again shown having any doubts about her lack of interest in romance. This is never mentioned in the other series.

Rei's lifelong dream is to become the head priestess at Hikawa Shrine, and much of her life is influenced by spirituality, particularly in the manga. Meditation is given as her strong point, and she enjoys fortune-telling as a hobby. The elegance of her character is further underscored by the contrast between her favorite subject, ancient writing, and her least favorite, modern society. She also belongs to the Archery club at school, which later provides the context for her most powerful weapon, the Mars Arrow. Rei is also skilled in martial arts and a talented skier in the anime. As for more general tastes, Rei likes the colors red and black, plum juice, fugu, Thai food, white casablancas, ruby gemstones, little lizards, and pandas, and dislikes men in general. The manga states that she once enjoyed Devilman, which the English manga changes to Buffy.

In Pretty Guardian Sailor Moon, Rei has problems trusting people, even her fellow Sailor Guardians, and has a tendency to rely too much on herself. She says that she hates karaoke (which the other girls love, especially Usagi), but is later forced by Minako into posing as an idol. As "Mars Reiko," she appears on three occasions: performing for hospitalized people, working alongside Minako, and staging a contest with Minako in order to stop her from quitting the idol business. She has a complex relationship with Minako; though they often disagree and compete with each other, they also share great respect. Minako even sometimes lets her guard down around Rei, and eventually confides to her about what she feels is her destiny as a Sailor Guardian. Rei is told that she is to be the secondary leader of the Guardians, and alternately admires and resents Minako's teachings about what that means. She later becomes aware of Mio hurting Usagi just to keep Mamoru at Beryl's side and confronts her while in the Dark Kingdom. Rei tells her off it is her own selfishness that is encouraging Serenity to keep using the crystal and give her a choice: allow Mamoru and Usagi to see each other even for a day or she will tell her friends about Mio (which will not end well for her). Mio wisely chooses to let them see each other in order to keep Rei quiet about her. Mars uses her own dagger with Venus' to attempt to stop Serenity from destroying the Earth.

In the Special Act movie, Rei senses Mio's return and investigates it with Luna. She is later incapacitated by Mio's growing dark powers.

== Aspects and forms ==
As a character with different incarnations, special powers, transformations and a long lifetime virtually spanned between the Silver Millennium era and the 30th century, Rei gains multiple aspects and aliases as the series progresses.

=== Sailor Mars ===
Rei's Sailor Guardian identity is Sailor Mars. She wears a sailor suit colored in red and violet, along with red high heels, and in the manga and live-action series has a small red jewel at the waist, though this vanishes upon upgrades. (Concept art shows this was supposed to appear as a necklace when not transformed but never does) She is given specific titles throughout the various series, including Guardian of War and Guardian of Flame and Passion. Her personality is no different from when she is a civilian, although certain powers are unavailable to her in that form.

In Japanese, the name for the planet Mars is Kasei (火星), the first kanji meaning 'fire' and the second indicating a celestial object. Although the Roman planet-name is used, Sailor Mars' abilities are fire-based due to this aspect of Japanese mythology. Most are offensive attacks, although as a priestess, she also possesses a certain amount of psychic ability, and is able to do fire-readings, sense danger, and subdue evil spirits. In the manga, she is listed as the secondary leader of the Sailor Guardians, after Sailor Venus. This fact is especially significant in the live-action series.

As she grows stronger, Sailor Mars gains additional powers, and at key points her uniform changes to reflect this. The first change takes place in Act 41 of the manga, when she obtains the Mars Crystal and her outfit becomes similar to that of Super Sailor Moon. She is not given a new title. A similar event is divided between episodes 143 and 152 of the anime, and she is given the name Super Sailor Mars. A third form appears in Act 49 of the manga, unnamed but similar to Eternal Sailor Moon (without wings). In the official visual book for Sailor Moon Eternal, this form was named "Eternal Sailor Mars".

=== Princess Mars ===
In Silver Millennium, Sailor Mars was also the Princess of her home planet. She was among those given the duty of protecting Princess Serenity of the Moon Kingdom. As Princess Mars, she lived in Phobos-Deimos Castle and wore a red gown—she appears in this form in the original manga, as well as in supplementary art. Naoko Takeuchi once drew her in the arms of Jadeite. In the manga, he expresses at least a physical attraction to her, and in Sailor Moon Crystal and in the stage musicals it is clearly stated that Sailor Mars and Jadeite were in love at the time of the Moon Kingdom.

It is revealed later in the manga that Phobos and Deimos are actually maidens from Planet Coronis sent to protect Princess Mars. They take the form of crows during the present time and were near Rei when she first came to the shrine as a child, supposedly "telling" her their names. Phobos and Deimos reveal their true forms when delivering the Mars Crystal to her and refer to her using her princess title.

== Special powers and items ==
Sailor Mars using Akuryō Taisan in Sailor Moon Crystal

Rei is one of few Sailor Moon characters who is able to use special powers in her civilian form. These are mainly the result of her role as a shrine maiden, which gives her heightened spirituality as well as certain resources. In addition to some psychic talent, including occasional unprompted premonitions, Rei is able to do fire readings and to dispel evil spirits. She does the latter by performing Kuji-Goshin-Ho, a ritual which consists of chanting nine words of power (Rin, Pyō, Tō, Sha, Kai, Jin, Retsu, Zai, Zen!) while making relevant hand signs. She then shouts "Evil spirit, be exorcised!" (悪霊退散, Akuryō Taisan!), and throws one or multiple ofuda scrolls. (Note: In the DiC and CWi dubs of the anime, these incantations are initially replaced by the phrases, "I summon the power of Mars!" and "Mars Fireballs Charge!"—despite the fact that no fire is involved. Later, the literal translation "Evil Spirits, Begone!" is used instead.) She commonly uses this attack while in her Sailor Mars form as well as when she is in her civilian form.

Rei must transform into a Sailor Guardian, however, before she can access her celestial powers. She makes this change by raising a special device (pen, bracelet, wand, or crystal) into the air and shouting a special phrase, originally "Mars Power, Make-up!" (Note: In the DIC and Cloverway English adaptations, Rei does not say 'Make up' when transforming.) As she becomes more powerful and obtains new transformation devices, this phrase changes to evoke Mars Star, Planet, or Crystal Power. In both anime, Sailor Mars' transformation sequence evolves slightly over time, whether to update the background images or to accommodate changes to her uniform or new transformation items, but they all involve rings of fire that circle her body as she spins, forming her outfit in a flash of light.

Sailor Mars has the power to create and control fire. Her named powers are somewhat inconsistent across the various series—in the first arc of the manga, she says "Evil spirits, begone!" the same phrase she uses as a civilian while using an ofuda, for her fire attacks. In the anime, she shoots a fireball from her index fingers and shouts the words "Fire Soul" (Note: This attack is given a multitude of names in the DIC dub, including "Mars Fire Ignite," "Mars Fireballs Flash," "Mega Mars Fire," "Mega Mars Fire Flash," "Mars Fire Blast," and simply "Flash.") and in the live-action series she shouts "Youma Taisan" ("Monster, begone"). This basic power is improved to "Fire Soul Bird" in the second arc of the anime only; the manga and Sailor Moon Crystal also have her develop an animal-based attack, "Mars Snake Fire," but it does not appear until the third story arc. Her first attack to be the same across all versions is "Burning Mandala," which incorporates Buddhist symbolism in the fiery rings Sailor Mars summons. (Note: In the DIC dub, this attack is named "Mars Celestial Fire Surround," "Celestial Fire Surround," and '"Mars Fire Surround.") She is not immune to her own powers, as she is able to use them for a suicide move in the anime.

Sailor Mars' final and greatest power comes in the fourth story arc, when she takes on her second Sailor Guardian form (Super Sailor Mars in the anime). At this point in the series, she acquires a special weapon, the Mars Arrow, and with it "Mars Flame Sniper," (Note: This attack is usually called Mars Flame Shooter in the Cloverway dub.) which is her primary attack for the duration of the series. In the manga, the Mars Crystal and Mars Arrow are among her most significant mystical possessions. The former is her Sailor Crystal and the source of all of her power. The latter is associated with her skill as an archer, and although she does not receive a physical bow, she recalls some advice given to her by Michiru Kaioh—"[If] you think you're being taken advantage of by the enemies, stretch a line taut in your soul. Then, with your whole body and spirit, shoot the arrow of your finishing blow!"

By holding hands with the other Sailor Guardians in a circle, she can use Sailor Teleport, Sailor Planet Attack, or Sailor Planet Power Meditation. When she is controlled by Galaxia in the manga and Crystal, she teams up with the other Inner Sailor Guardians to perform Galactica Gale. She, the Inner, and Outer Guardians then perform Galactica Planet Attack.

In the live-action series, she is given a tambourine-like weapon, called the Sailor Star Tambo, by Artemis. During the final battle, her Tambo transforms into a dagger, which she uses alongside Sailor Venus's similar dagger. In the "Special Act", Venus wields both weapons.

== Development ==
Rei is not named in the original proposal for a hypothetical Codename: Sailor V anime, but an identical character in miko clothing is present, named Miyabi Yoruno. Creator Naoko Takeuchi revealed that this character eventually became Rei, and wrote that her role as a shrine maiden was inspired by Takeuchi's own experience working as a miko for Shiba Daijingu Shrine while in college. She also stated that she was frequently hit on by the shrine's patrons, a source of annoyance that carries over into the character.

Hikawa Shrine, where Rei lives and works, is based on the Hikawa Shrines, one of which is in Azabu Jūban, where the story is set. The kanji for "ice" in the original name (氷川神社) is replaced with the kanji for "fire"; a reflection of Rei's fire-related powers.

Sailor Mars' original costume design, like the others', was fully unique. It featured an alternate bow, double shoulder-guards, plate-armor, elaborate jewelry, and a gold-rimmed mask. Her trademark high-heeled shoes were already present, as well. Later, Takeuchi was surprised by these sketches and stated that she did not remember drawing them. In an intermediate design, the pendant that sat at her waist in the early manga was also intended to be worn as a necklace in her civilian form. Hitoshi Doi states that Kunihiko Ikuhara was responsible for much of Rei's changed personality in the anime.

The kanji of Rei's surname translate as "fire" (火, hi) and "field" or "civilian" (野, no). Her given name is in katakana rei (レイ); possible meanings include "spirit" (霊), "companion" (儷), "cool" (冷), and "zero" (零). Because katakana is the alphabet usually used for foreign loanwords, it may also be intended as a Western name, such as Raye (which is indeed used in American continent localizations) or Rae. In the Chinese versions of the series (anime and manga), Rei's name is written with the character "麗", which carries the same phonetic as "Rei", but means "beauty" and "elegance", and, ultimately, is the one included in the 5th Original Picture Collection Volume Artbook (Vol. V) (meaning that Rei's name written all in Kanji is "火野麗" (lit. "Fire-Field Beauty/Elegance" / "Beauty/Elegance of Fire")). Regardless, the entire name is structured as a pun, as the syllable "no" indicates a possessive, so that her name can also be understood as "Ray of Fire." Her prototypical name, Miyabi Yoruno (夜野 みやび, Yoruno Miyabi), means "Elegance of Night" (みやび = 雅).

It has been noted that her outfit as Sailor Mars echoes the colors of her miko robes, and she is the only character that is mostly tied into tradition.

=== Actresses ===
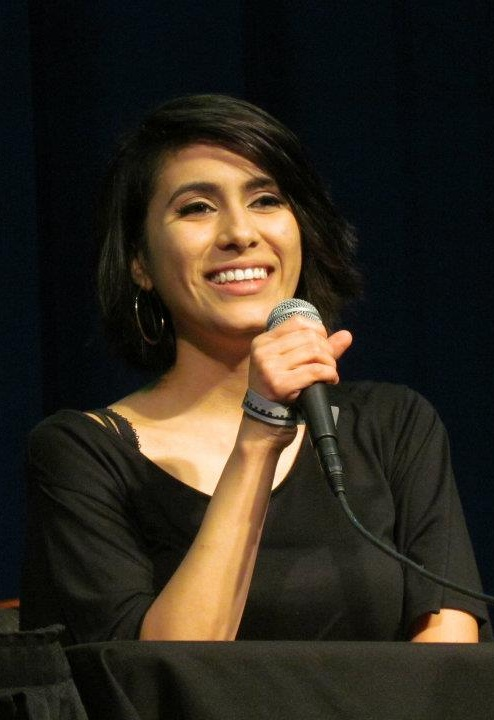
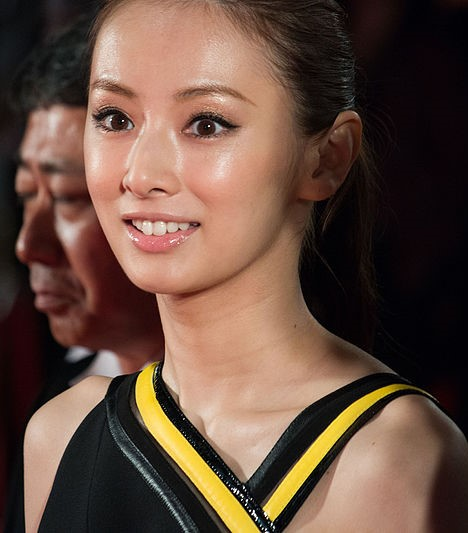
Cristina Vee (left) voices Rei in the Viz Media dubs of the original anime and Crystal. Keiko Kitagawa (right) played the character in Pretty Guardian Sailor Moon.

In the Japanese anime television series, Rei is voiced by Michie Tomizawa, who later said that working on Sailor Moon had been "exactly like magic" for her. Rina Satō voices the character in Sailor Moon Crystal and all media since.

In the DIC/Cloverway English adaptations produced in association with Optimum Productions, her name was spelled as Raye Hino and was voiced by Katie Griffin, in her first voice acting role, for most of the franchise; however, Emilie-Claire Barlow filled in for the last 17 episodes of the second season while Griffin was involved in a film production. Raye was also Barlow's first voice acting role, and she said that during recording, it was difficult to take care of her voice, as Raye "had a lot of yelling." She also listened to Griffin's recording sessions to help with the voice matching. Barlow would later become the permanent replacement voice for Sailor Venus after Griffin returned to voice Sailor Mars. Sandy Howell also provides English vocals for songs sung by Raye in the English dub.

In the Viz Media English adaptation produced in association with Studiopolis, her voice is supplied by Cristina Vee, a long-time Sailor Moon fan.

In the musical productions, Rei has been portrayed by nineteen actresses: Hiroko Nakayama, Misako Kotani, Asuka Umemiya, Hiromi Sakai, Eri Kanda, Megumi Yoshida, Aiko Kawasaki, Risa Honma, Kanon Nanaki, Karen Kobayashi., Kazumi Takayama, Ranze Terada, Kotomi Hirai, Kyoko Ninomiya, Yui Hasegawa, Seira Hayakawa, Rei Kobayashi, Hina Okamoto, and Miku Ichinose.

In Pretty Guardian Sailor Moon, Rei was played by Keiko Kitagawa. In addition, Haruhi Mizukuro and Akira Tanaka portray the younger Rei in flashbacks and childhood photos.

== Reception ==
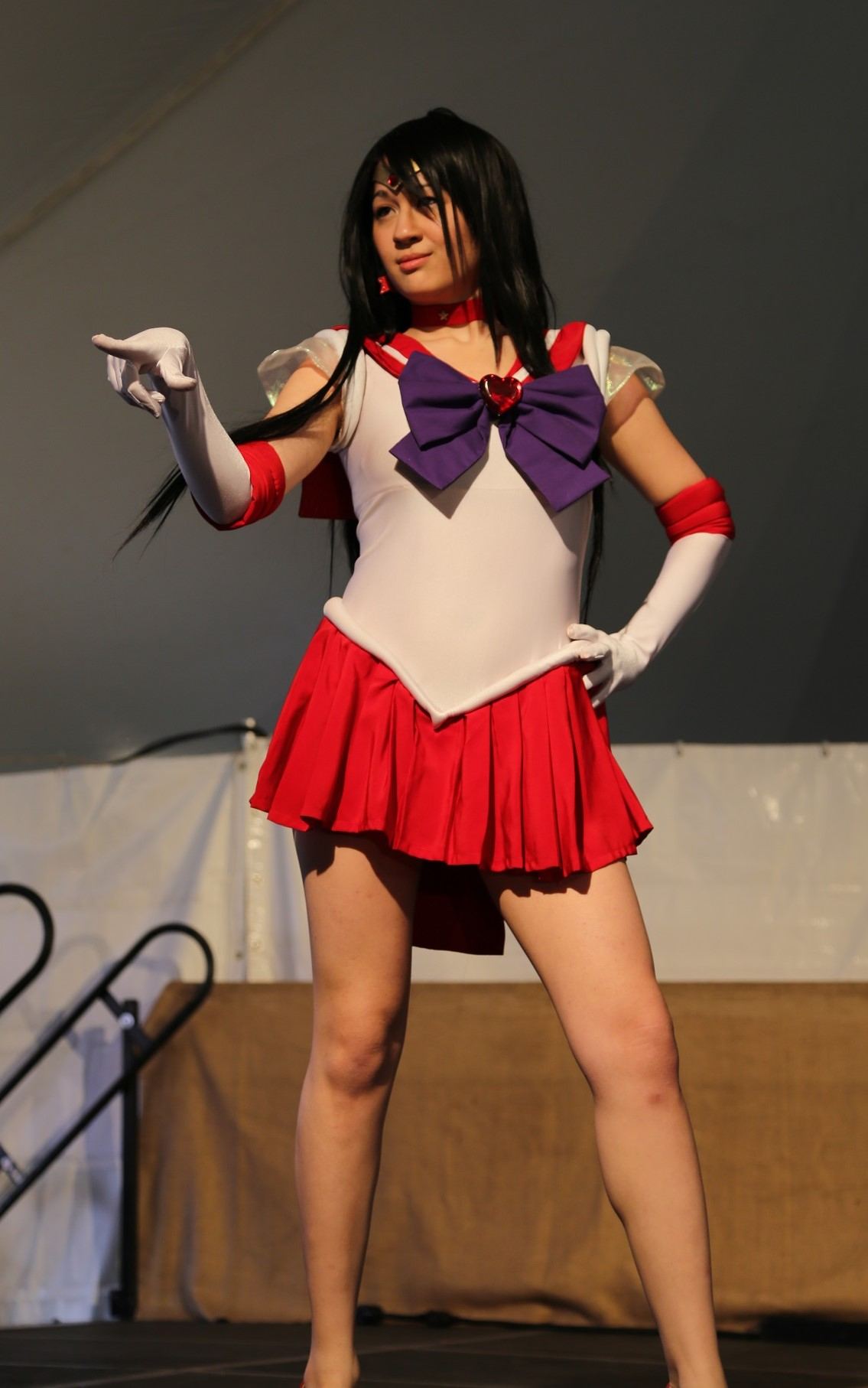
Sailor Mars has become a popular subject of cosplay.

The character has been well received by manga readers. Official Sailor Moon popularity polls listed Rei Hino and Sailor Mars as separate entities. In 1992, readers ranked them at thirteenth and fourteenth respectively, out of thirty eight choices. One year later, now with fifty choices, Mars remained at fourteenth most popular while Rei dropped to fifteenth. In 1994, with fifty one choices, Rei was the twentieth most popular character, whereas Sailor Mars was the twenty-second, with a gap between the two characters of over three thousand votes. In early 1996, with fifty one choices, Sailor Mars was the thirty-first most popular character and Rei was the thirty-second. In Animage's 1993 poll, she came sixth. In 1994, she came tenth.

A five-book series was published, one book on each of the Sailor Guardians and Sailor Moon. Rei's was released in 1996. This book was later translated into English by Mixx. The episode where Sailor Mars gained her powers was novelised by Mixx. Other merchandise has been released based on her character, including T-shirts, fashion dolls, trading card stickers, gashapon and UFO dolls.

Rei Ayanami of Neon Genesis Evangelion is named after Rei Hino. She has also been referenced in non-Japanese media: DC Comics character Martian Manhunter briefly assumes the form of a female Japanese journalist named Rei Hino and is told by Batman that the name is a "giveaway."

== See also ==
- Mars in fiction
- Mars (mythology)
- Vulcan (mythology)
