= List of Sailor Moon characters =

Characters of Japanese manga series

The main cast of Sailor Moon as seen in the 1990s anime adaptation (Note: From left to right: Top row: Diana (above) and Luna-P, Sailor Star Fighter, Princess Kakyuu, Sailor Star Healer, Sailor Star Maker. Upper middle row: Sailor Jupiter, Sailor Neptune, Sailor Uranus, Sailor Pluto. Middle row: Artemis, Sailor Venus, Sailor Chibi-Chibi, Tuxedo Mask. Lower middle row: Sailor Mars, Sailor Moon, Sailor Mercury. Bottom row: Sailor Chibi Moon, Sailor Saturn, Luna.)

The Sailor Moon manga series features a cast of characters created by Naoko Takeuchi. The series takes place in Tokyo, Japan, where the Sailor Guardians (セーラー戦士, Sērā Senshi), a group of ten magical girls, are formed to fight against antagonists who aim to take over the Earth, the Solar System and the Milky Way. Each Guardian undergoes a transformation which grants her a uniform in her own theme colors and an elemental power. They are named after the planets of the Solar System, with the exception of Earth but including its moon. While many characters are humans who possess superhuman strength and magical abilities, the cast also includes anthropomorphic animals and extraterrestrial lifeforms.

The series follows the adventures of the titular protagonist, Sailor Moon, her lover Tuxedo Mask, her cat advisor Luna, and her guardians and friends: Sailors Mercury, Mars, Jupiter and Venus. They are later joined by Chibiusa, Sailor Moon and Tuxedo Mask's daughter from the future, and four more guardians: Sailors Uranus, Neptune, Pluto and Saturn. The series' antagonists include the Dark Kingdom, the Black Moon Clan, the Death Busters, the Dead Moon Circus and Shadow Galactica.

Takeuchi's initial concept for the series was Codename: Sailor V, in which Sailor V discovers her magical powers and protects the people of Earth. After the Codename: Sailor V manga was proposed for an anime adaptation, Takeuchi changed her concept to include ten superheroines who defend the galaxy. The manga's anime, live-action, musical and video game adaptations feature original characters the production staff created rather than Takeuchi.

== Creation and conception ==
Naoko Takeuchi initially wrote Codename: Sailor V, a one-shot manga that focused on Sailor Venus. When Toei Animation proposed it for an anime adaptation, Takeuchi changed the concept to include Sailor Venus as a part of a "sentai" (team of five) and created the characters of Sailors Moon, Mercury, Mars and Jupiter.

The name "Sailor Senshi" is derived from sailor fuku, a type of Japanese school uniform that the main characters' fighting uniforms are based on, and the Japanese word senshi, which can mean "soldier", "warrior", "guardian", or "fighter". Takeuchi created the term by fusing English and Japanese words. DIC Entertainment/Cloverway's English adaptation of the anime changed it to "Sailor Scout" for most of its run. According to Takeuchi, only females can be Sailor Guardians. However, in the anime's fifth season, the Sailor Starlights are depicted as men transforming into women when changing from their normal forms into Sailor Guardians, rather than women disguising as men as they appear in the manga.

Takeuchi wanted to create a series about girls in outer space, and her editor, Fumio Osano, suggested that she add the "sailor suit" motif to their uniforms. Takeuchi settled on a more unified appearance in later stages of character design. Among the protagonist Sailor Guardians, Sailor Venus, during her time as Sailor V, has the only outfit that varies significantly from the others. Sailor Moon, regardless of form, always has a more elaborate costume than others, and has individual power-ups more frequently than other characters. Sailor Guardians originating from outside the Solar System have different and varying outfits, but the sailor collar serves as a unifying trait in their designs.

Most of the antagonists in the series have names related to metals, minerals and gemstones, including Queen Beryl, Queen Metaria, Four Kings of Heaven, the Black Moon Clan, Kaolinite, Witches 5, most members of the Dead Moon Circus, and the Sailor Animamates. Exceptions include Souichi Tomoe, members of the Amazoness Quartet, incarnations of Chaos sans Metaria, and members of Shadow Galactica barring the Sailor Animamates.

== Main characters ==
The Sailor Guardians as seen in Sailor Moon Crystal (season 3)

=== Sailor Moon ===
Usagi Tsukino (月野 うさぎ, Tsukino Usagi; called Serena Tsukino in the original English dub of the first anime adaptation) is the titular protagonist of the series. She is a fourteen-year-old girl who is sometimes careless but has a great capacity for love, compassion and understanding. Usagi transforms into the heroine Sailor Moon, the Guardian of Love and Justice. At the beginning of the series, she is a self-described immature crybaby who resents fighting evil and wants nothing more than to be a normal girl. As the story progresses, she embraces the chance to use her power to protect those she cares about.

=== Tuxedo Mask ===
Mamoru Chiba (地場 衛, Chiba Mamoru; called Darien Shields in the original English dub) is a student who is older than Usagi. When he was young, he was in a car accident that killed his parents and lost his memories. He and Usagi share a special psychic connection, and he can sense when she is in danger. This inspires him to take on the guise of Tuxedo Mask and fight alongside the Sailor Guardians when needed. After an initially confrontational relationship, he and Usagi remember their past lives and fall in love again.

=== Sailor Mercury ===
Ami Mizuno (水野 亜美, Mizuno Ami; called Amy Anderson in the original English dub) is a fourteen-year-old bookworm in Usagi's class, who is quiet yet intelligent and rumored to have an IQ of 300. She can transform into Sailor Mercury, the Guardian of Water and Wisdom. Despite her shy exterior, she is passionate about learning and taking care of those around her and hopes to eventually become a doctor like her mother. She tends to be the practical one of the group and is secretly a fan of pop culture and romance novels, and becomes embarrassed when this is pointed out. She owns a handheld computer which can scan and detect virtually anything which she needs information about.

=== Sailor Mars ===
Rei Hino (火野 レイ, Hino Rei; called Raye Hino in the original English dub) is an elegant fourteen-year-old miko (English: shrine maiden). Because of her work as a Shinto priestess, she has limited precognition and can dispel or nullify evil using special ofuda scrolls, even in her civilian form. She transforms into Sailor Mars, the Guardian of Fire and Passion. She is very serious and focused and easily annoyed by Usagi's laziness, but cares about her. In the anime adaptation, Rei is portrayed as boy-crazy and short-tempered, while in the manga and live-action series she is depicted as uninterested in romance and more self-controlled. She attends a private Catholic school separate from the other girls.

=== Sailor Jupiter ===
Makoto Kino (木野 まこと, Kino Makoto; called Lita Kino in the original English dub) is a fourteen-year-old girl who is a student in Usagi's class. She excels at hand-to-hand combat and is rumored to have been expelled from her previous school for fighting. She is unusually tall and strong for a Japanese schoolgirl, and transforms into Sailor Jupiter, the Guardian of Thunder and Courage. Because her parents died in a plane crash years ago, she lives alone and takes care of herself. She cultivates her physical strength and domestic interests, including housekeeping, cooking and gardening. Her dream is to marry a young handsome man and to own a flower-and-cake shop.

=== Sailor Venus ===
Minako Aino (愛野 美奈子, Aino Minako; called Mina Aino in the original English dub) is a fourteen-year-old girl who first appears as the titular main protagonist of Codename: Sailor V. She has a companion cat called Artemis, who works alongside Luna in guiding the Sailor Guardians. Minako transforms into Sailor Venus, the Guardian of Love and Beauty, and leads Sailor Moon's Four Inner Guardians while acting as her bodyguard and decoy because of their similar appearances. She dreams of becoming a famous singer and idol and attends auditions whenever she can. In contrast, in the live-action series, she is a successful J-pop singer whom Usagi, Ami and Makoto are fans of and has poor health due to her anemia, causing her to choose to isolate herself from the other Guardians.

=== Sailor Chibi Moon ===
Chibiusa (ちびうさ, Chibiusa; called "Rini" in the original English dub) is the future daughter of Neo-Queen Serenity and King Endymion in the 30th century. She later trains with Sailor Moon to become a Sailor Guardian in her own right, and learns to transform into Sailor Chibi Moon (known as "Sailor Mini Moon" in the English series). At times, she has an adversarial relationship with her mother, but as the series progresses they develop a deep bond, with her wanting to grow up to become like her.

=== Sailor Pluto ===
Setsuna Meioh (冥王 せつな, Meiō Setsuna; called Trista Meioh in the original English dub) is a mysterious woman who initially appears as Sailor Pluto, the Guardian of Space-Time and Change. She has the duty of guarding the Space-Time Door against unauthorized travelers, but later appears on Earth living as a college student. She has a distant personality and can be very stern, but can also be friendly and helps the Sailor Guardians when she can. After her long vigil guarding the Space-Time Door, she carries a deep sense of loneliness, although she is close friends with Chibiusa, who calls her by her nickname "Puu". Her talisman, the Garnet Orb, aids her power to attack and temporarily stop time.

=== Sailor Uranus ===
Haruka Tenoh (天王 はるか, Ten'ō Haruka; called Amara Tenoh in the original English dub) is a good-natured tomboyish girl who is a year older than most of the other Sailor Guardians. She transforms into Sailor Uranus, the Guardian of the Sky and Flight. Before becoming a Sailor Guardian, she aspired to become a race car driver, and has excellent driving skills. She tends to dress and, in the anime, speak like a man, with other characters often mistaking her for a man. When fighting the enemy, she distrusts outside help and prefers to work solely with her partner and girlfriend, Sailor Neptune, and later Pluto and Saturn. Her talisman, the Space Sword, aids her fighting.

=== Sailor Neptune ===
Michiru Kaioh (海王 みちる, Kaiō Michiru; called Michelle Kaioh in the original English dub) is an elegant and talented violinist and painter. Similar to her partner and lover, Haruka Tenoh, she hails from a wealthy family, though they are not mentioned in the series. She transforms into Sailor Neptune, the Guardian of the Ocean and Embrace. She worked alone for some time before finding her partner, Sailor Uranus. Neptune ultimately gave up her dreams and devoted herself to her duty as a Sailor Guardian, which she is willing to make sacrifices for. Her talisman, the Deep Aqua Mirror, aids her intuition and reveals cloaked evil.

=== Sailor Saturn ===
Hotaru Tomoe (土萠 ほたる, Tomoe Hotaru) is a sweet and lonely young girl, whose health was compromised following a laboratory accident in her youth. After overcoming the darkness that surrounded her family, she transforms into Sailor Saturn, the Guardian of Silence, Destruction and Rebirth. She is often pensive, and as a human has the power to heal others. She wields the Silence Glaive, which gives her the power to generate barriers and destroy a planet. When she uses that power, she kills herself, but Sailor Moon later revives her and she comes to live with Haruka, Michiru and Setsuna as an adopted family.

== Antagonists ==
=== Dark Kingdom ===
The Dark Kingdom (ダーク・キングダム, Dāku Kingudamu; called Negaverse in the original English dub) are the first set of antagonists the Sailor Guardians encounter, who appear in the first arc of the manga and its adaptions. Established by Queen Beryl, its members mostly consist of brainwashed reincarnations of residents from the Golden Kingdom of Earth who aim to gather human energy and find the Silver Crystal to reawaken Queen Metaria, who was responsible for the destruction of the Silver Millennium of the Moon and the Golden Kingdom.

=== Hell Tree aliens ===
The Hell Tree aliens (魔界樹エイリアン, Makai Ju Eirian; called the Doom Tree aliens in the original English dub) are a group who only appear in the anime, serving as the main antagonists of the first thirteen episodes of Sailor Moon R. Ail and An are two aliens who wandered space for many years before reaching Earth, where they collect energy to revive the Hell Tree so that it can give them energy to survive. Unlike other antagonists of the series, their mission was primarily that of survival, rather than conquest or destruction. The DIC dub had Ail and An making a mentioning in their first appearance of having met Queen Beryl at some point in their life.

==== Ail and An ====
Ail (エイル, Eiru; called Alan in the DiC dub) and An (アン; called Ann in the DiC dub) are humanoid aliens who pose, respectively, as Seijūrō Ginga (銀河 星十郎, Ginga Seijūrō; called Alan Granger in the DiC dub) and Natsumi Ginga (銀河 夏美, Ginga Natsumi; called Ann Granger in the DiC dub), siblings who transfer to Usagi's school and live in the Jūban Odyssey apartments. While trying to blend in, Ail acts as An's brother and develops a crush on Usagi and tries to win her over, much to An's dismay. Despite this, he constantly denies these feelings to her, knowing her tendency to have fits of jealous rage. An later develops a crush on Mamoru and tries to win him over, much to Ail and Usagi's dismay. Ail and An are the only two of their kind.

In Japanese, in the original series, they are voiced by Hikaru Midorikawa and Yumi Tōma, respectively. In the DIC English dub they are voiced by Vince Corazza and Sabrina Grdevich, respectively, and in the Viz Media dub they are voiced by Brian Beacock and Dorothy Elias-Fahn, respectively.

==== The Hell Tree ====
The Hell Tree (魔界樹, Makai Ju; called the Doom Tree in the DIC English dub) is an alien tree that nourishes Ail and An. It lived alone on an island in a vast ocean on a faraway planet before creating life and giving energy to its many children. The children became greedy and fought each other until the planet was destroyed, with the tree and Ail and An as the only survivors. The tree became weak and required energy to stay alive, with Ail and An supplying it with human energy to revive it, which eventually stops working. The tree becomes angered and starts to injure those around it, killing An in the process. Sailor Moon uses her power to purify the Tree and resurrect An, who, along with Ail and a reborn tree in the form of a small sapling, leave Earth for a better life.

In Japanese, the Hell Tree is voiced by Taeko Nakanishi. In the English dub, it is voiced by Elizabeth Hanna in the DIC English adaptation and by Erin Fitzgerald in the Viz Media English adaptation.

==== Cardians ====
The Cardians (カーディアン, Kādian) are monsters of the week Ail and An use to obtain energy to revive the Hell Tree. They are kept in cards until Ail summons them by playing a tune on his flute, causing it to come alive. When a Cardian is destroyed, it changes back into its card form and the picture of it on the card fades to black.

=== Black Moon Clan ===
The Black Moon Clan (ブラック・ムーン一族, Burakku Mūn Ichizoku; called Negamoon Family in the original English dub) are the main antagonists of the "Black Moon" arc of the manga and its adaptations. They are a terrorist group from the 30th century led by Prince Demand and based on the planet Nemesis, which provides them with the Malefic Black Crystal, whose goal of ending Neo-Queen Serenity's reign is being manipulated by the mysterious Wiseman.

=== Death Busters ===
The Death Busters (デス・バスターズ, Desu Basutāzu; called Heart Snatchers in the original English dub) are the main antagonists of the "Infinity" arc of the manga and its adaptions. Initially led by Kaolinite and Professor Souichi Tomoe before the resurrection of their true leader Mistress 9, they are human-alien hybrids seeking to bring the alien creature Pharaoh 90 to terraform Earth.

=== Dead Moon Circus ===
The Dead Moon Circus (デッド・ムーン・サーカス, Deddo Mūn Sākasu; called Dark Moon Circus in the original English dub) are the main antagonists of the "Dream" arc of the manga and its adaptations. Led by Zirconia, they seek the Golden Crystal to release their ruler Queen Nehelenia from her mirror prison and take over Earth.

=== Shadow Galactica ===
Shadow Galactica (シャドウ・ギャラクティカ, Shadō Gyarakutika) are the main antagonists of the final arc of the manga and its adaptations. They are an organization of corrupted Sailor Guardians led by Sailor Galaxia, who devote themselves to stealing Star Seeds, the essence of sentient life, from inhabitants of the Milky Way. Their ultimate goal is to reorganize the universe as desired by Chaos, the overarching antagonist of the series.

== Supporting characters ==
=== Luna, Artemis and Diana ===
Luna, Artemis and Diana are cats from the planet Mau, which is named after the Chinese word "貓", meaning "cat", who act as advisors to their owners. They are capable of speech and have a crescent moon symbol on their forehead, and can also assume a human form. The two older cats, Luna and Artemis, lived in the Moon Kingdom millennia before the events of the series and were advisors to Queen Serenity; the third, Diana, is much younger and was born on Earth. The cats serve as mentors and confidantes, as well as a source of information and new tools and items. Although Luna has the largest role of the three, Artemis was the first to appear and was also prominent in Codename: Sailor V.

In Act 55 of the manga, Sailor Tin Nyanko, a false Guardian from Mau, attacks them. Artemis calls it a peace-loving world, but Tin Nyanko informs him that Sailor Galaxia wiped out its people after he and Luna left. She blasts them on their crescent moon symbols and they turn into ordinary cats, unable to speak. Later, as they care for the cats, Princess Kakyuu informs Usagi that they have powerful Star Seeds which are as brilliant as Sailor Crystals. In Act 56, they are brought to the River Lethe and Sailor Lethe kills them, but are reincarnated at the end of the series along with everyone else. (Note: Luna and Artemis return and give birth to Diana in the future.)

In the live-action series, Luna and Artemis are portrayed as stuffed toys rather than real cats. They are usually represented using puppets, though CGI effects are used for complicated scenes.

Writer Mary Grigsby considers the cat characters to blend pre-modern ideas about feminine mystery with modern ideas such as the lucky cat.

==== Luna ====
Luna (ルナ, Runa) is a black cat who was a devoted servant to Princess Serenity and advisor to her mother, Queen Serenity. When the kingdom fell, she and Artemis were put into a long sleep and sent to Earth to look after the Sailor Guardians, who are reborn there, with parts of her memory suppressed so that she must find the Sailor Guardians. She also provides them with many of their items. She first encounters Usagi and teaches her to become Sailor Moon, unaware that she is actually the reincarnated Princess Serenity. Over the course of the series, Luna develops a close bond with Usagi, though it is initially on uneasy terms, as Luna often upsets her by giving her unsolicited advice. She and Artemis have an implied romantic relationship, which is confirmed when they meet Diana, their daughter from the future.

==== Artemis ====
Artemis (アルテミス, Arutemisu) is the white cat companion to Minako Aino, who trains her to become Sailor V and remains by her side when she takes on her proper role as Sailor Venus. He first guides Usagi through the Sailor V video game at the Crown Game Center arcade without revealing his true identity. In the anime, when a technical problem reveals him, Luna is annoyed to learn that he was guiding her. Later, he fills Luna in on the details of her true mission. In the Sailor V manga and the live-action series, he gives special items to the Guardians, but unlike Luna does not seem to produce them himself. He does not seem to mind the fact that he is named after a female goddess, even when Minako teases him about it. He is more easy-going than Luna and has a "big brother" relationship with Minako, although it is implied he is attracted to her. He also cares deeply for Luna, often comforting her when she is distressed and stating his admiration of her. In addition, he is a good father to Diana, as evidenced by her affection for him.

In Japanese, Artemis is voiced by Yasuhiro Takato in the first anime adaptation, by Yohei Oobayashi in the first three seasons of Crystal, and Taishi Murata in Eternal and Cosmos films. In the live-action series, he is voiced by Kappei Yamaguchi. He appears in the first Sailor Moon musical, played by a cat-suited Keiji Himeno. In English, he is voiced by Ron Rubin in the DIC/Cloverway English adaptation and by Johnny Yong Bosch in the Viz Media English adaptation.

==== Diana ====
Diana (ダイアナ, Daiana) is a gray cat and the future daughter of Luna and Artemis, who first appears when the Sailor Guardians travel to the 30th century in the Black Moon arc. After defeating Death Phantom, she joins them after they return to the 20th century. In the anime, she first appears in Sailor Moon SuperS, calling Artemis her father, to Luna's initial dismay. It is later revealed that she is from the future and that her mother is Luna. Just as Luna and Artemis guide Usagi and Minako, Diana acts as a guardian to Chibiusa. She is curious, eager to help and polite, always addressing Usagi and Mamoru with the Japanese honorific "-sama" and calling Chibiusa by her formal title, Small Lady. Despite her youth, she is occasionally able to help the Sailor Guardians, often because of the knowledge she has gained in the future.

In Japanese, Diana is voiced by Kumiko Nishihara in the first series and by Shoko Nakagawa in Crystal. In English, she is voiced by Loretta Jafelice in the Cloverway English adaptation, by Naomi Emmerson in Sailor Moon SuperS: The Movie, and by Debi Derryberry in the Viz Media English adaptation.

In one of her reviews of Sailor Moon Crystal, IGN writer Meghan Sullivan admitted that the scene in which Diana tells Sailor Pluto to go and help Chibiusa and the Sailor Guardians while she guards the Door of Time and Space made her tear up, stating: "Here was this tiny cat—who by her own admission has no powers and is too small to fight, offering to help however she could. It's moments like these that remind me why I love Sailor Moon so much."

=== Tsukino family ===
Several supporting characters. From top to bottom: (left column) Asanuma, Kotono, Motoki, Reika; (middle) Shingo, Momoko, Kyusuke; (right) Ikuko, Kenji, Naru, Umino, Sorano

==== Ikuko Tsukino ====
Ikuko Tsukino (月野 育子, Tsukino Ikuko) is Usagi's mother, who is often seen cooking and lecturing her for her grades in school. They are shown to be close, since she gives Usagi advice on relationships and eagerly accepts her relationship with Mamoru. She cares for Chibiusa when she is present, whom she believes to be her niece, but in reality is her future granddaughter. She also cares for Chibi-Chibi, whom she believes to be her second daughter. Ikuko's name and design are modeled after Takeuchi's mother.

In the live-action series, Ikuko is portrayed as an outgoing, quirky, and determined person. She changes her hairstyle almost every day, is constantly trying out new omelette recipes, and loves to be in the spotlight. She is a high-school friend with Minako's manager, and it is said they were participants in their school's theater program.

In Japanese, Ikuko is voiced by Sanae Takagi in the original series and in Crystal by Yūko Mizutani until her death in 2016, a role later taken over by Wakana Yamazaki in Cosmos. In English, she is voiced by Barbara Radecki in the DIC and Cloverway English dubs and by Tara Platt in the Viz Media English dub. Kaori Moriwaka portrays Ikuko in the live-action series.

==== Kenji Tsukino ====
Kenji Tsukino (月野 謙之, Tsukino Kenji) is Usagi's father. He is a stereotypical well-meaning Japanese salaryman, who works as a magazine reporter and later as an editor-in-chief. Early on, he becomes jealous when he sees Usagi with Mamoru Chiba, thinking he is too old for her. Like his wife, Kenji is unaware of Usagi's real identity. He senses a maturity in her when she is finally aware of her status as Princess Serenity, and notes that at times, her beauty seems serene. Kenji appears less frequently after the anime adaptation's second season.

He does not appear in the live-action series, which is explained by him being away on business trips. However, he appears briefly in the direct-to-DVD Special Act, crying at Usagi's wedding.

In Japanese, Kenji is voiced by Yuji Machi in the original series and by Mitsuaki Madono in Crystal. In English, he is voiced by David Huband in the DIC/Cloverway English adaptation and by Keith Silverstein in the Viz Media English adaptation. In the Special Act of the live-action series, he is portrayed by series director Ryuta Tasaki.

==== Shingo Tsukino ====
Shingo Tsukino (月野 進悟, Tsukino Shingo; called Samuel "Sammy" Tsukino in the original English dub) is Usagi's younger brother, making her the only Sailor Guardian with a known sibling. His influence in her life is alternately helpful and mocking; he considers her well-meaning, but also an accident-prone crybaby. Shingo generally does not get along with Usagi very well and sometimes gets into arguments with her, but they care for and love each other. Though unaware of his sister's true identity, Shingo is impressed by the urban legends of Sailor Moon and Sailor V, especially Sailor Moon because she rescued him from Dark Kingdom forces early in her career. Like his older sister, he enjoys video games, but unlike her, is a diligent student. Shingo's favorite book is Shonen J*mp (a reference to the manga anthology Weekly Shōnen Jump). In the anime, Shingo appears in several episodes of the first season, but appears less frequently afterwards.

In the live-action series, Shingo dislikes much of what his sister and mother do, and does not care much for life in general. In the video game Sailor Moon: Another Story, Shingo is kidnapped by the villains in an attempt to force Usagi to hand over the Silver Crystal.

In Japanese, Chiyoko Kawashima voices Shingo in the original series, and by Seira Ryū in Crystal. In English, he is voiced by Julie Lemieux in the DIC/Cloverway English adaptation and by Nicolas Roye in the Viz Media English adaptation. In the live-action series, he is portrayed by Naoki Takeshi.

=== Juban Public School ===
==== Naru Osaka ====
Naru Osaka (大阪 なる, Ōsaka Naru; called Molly Baker in the original English dub) is Usagi's best friend and schoolmate at the start of the series. She and her mother are the first victims of a monster attack, and she idolizes Sailor Moon for saving them. Throughout the series, she continues to be a frequent target of villains and monsters. Naru later attends the same high school as Usagi in Stars arc of the manga.

In a "memorable subplot" of the anime adaptation, Naru falls in love with Nephrite, who eventually returns her feelings and attempts to atone for his misdeeds. His death while protecting Naru devastates her throughout the first season, which Kotono Mitsuishi was particularly touched by. Naru also later dates Gurio Umino in the anime, and does not attend the same high school as Usagi. Naru plays a more important role in the live-action series, learning most of the truth about the Sailor Guardians. She is also a more confident and outgoing person. For a short while, she and Ami share a conflicted relationship, as both seem to be jealous of the other's closeness with Usagi. However, they resolve their differences and become good friends.

Naru's younger sister, Naruru, is featured in a short side-story in the Stars manga. In the anime it is stated that she is an only child.

In Japanese, Naru is voiced by Shino Kakinuma in the original series and by Satomi Satō in Crystal. In English, she is voiced by Mary Long in a heavy Brooklyn accent in the DIC/Cloverway English version and by Danielle Judovits in the Viz Media English version. Chieko Kawabe portrays her in the live-action series, and Yuka Yamauchi portrays her in the musical Pretty Guardian Sailor Moon - Nogizaka46 Version.

==== Gurio Umino ====
Gurio Umino (海野 ぐりお, Umino Gurio; called Melvin in the original English dub) is a student in Usagi's class at school, who at the beginning of the series has an infatuation with her. His defining characteristic is his glasses, which are drawn with swirls denoting their thickness. Umino is commonly portrayed as a "nerdy", "weird" and "know-it-all" otaku, regularly keeping Usagi informed on current events, new students, gossip and other information she might appreciate. Despite his ordinarily nerdy appearance, Umino is implied to be "relatively handsome" with his glasses off, which was later confirmed by Takeuchi. In the first anime, he develops a relationship with Naru, but their importance gradually decreases after the first season.

The kanji in Umino's surname mean either "ocean field" or "of ocean"; as such, it is constructed in the same way as Usagi's and those of other Sailor Guardians.

In Japanese, he is voiced by Keiichi Nanba in Sailor Moon and Daiki Yamashita in Crystal. In English, he is voiced by Roland Parliament in the DIC/Cloverway English adaptation and by Benjamin Diskin in the Viz Media English adaptation. In the musical Pretty Guardian Sailor Moon - Nogizaka46 Version, he is portrayed by Marina Tanoue.

==== Haruna Sakurada ====
Haruna Sakurada (桜田 春菜, Sakurada Haruna; called Patricia Haruna in the original English dub) is a junior high school teacher who often lectures Usagi for her laziness. Haruna intends to find a husband, which makes her an easy target for the Dark Kingdom during the first arc, and she often engages in seemingly childish things in this regard. She appears less frequently as the series progresses, and is never seen after Usagi and her friends start high school in the final season. In the live-action series, Haruna assigns pop quizzes and clean-up duty when needed. She is eccentric and friendly and motherly towards her students, even Usagi.

The kanji in her name mean "cherry blossom" (sakura), "rice field" (da), "spring" (haru) and "vegetables" (na). The "spring" part of her name becomes a pun in the context of other works by Takeuchi: Haruna appears in her earlier series, The Cherry Project, which features her sister Fuyuna in one of its side stories. Two other characters with similar names appear in Takeuchi works: Natsuna in Codename: Sailor V and Akina in PQ Angels, and also have the surname Sakurada. The Japanese words fuyu, natsu and aki mean "winter", "summer" and "autumn", respectively.

In Japanese, Haruna was originally voiced by Chiyoko Kawashima in Sailor Moon until her retirement in 2001, with Akemi Kanda voicing her in Crystal. In English, she is voiced by Nadine Rabinovitch in the DIC English adaptation and by Julie Ann Taylor in the Viz Media English adaptation. She is portrayed by Tomoko Otakara in the live-action series and by Kasumi Hyuga and Kiho Seishi in the musicals.

==== Momoko Momohara ====
Momoko Momohara (桃原 桃子, Momohara Momoko) is an elementary-school student who befriends Chibiusa. In the anime, she is badly injured in a fight with Chiral and Achiral, two Black Moon members, causing Chibiusa to go into a fit and unleash her latent powers at them. Later, Momoko becomes the first target of the Amazoness Quartet, but is saved by Sailor Chibi Moon and Sailor Moon. In Japanese, she is voiced by Taeko Kawata. In English, she is named Melissa and is voiced by Kathleen Laskey in the DIC English adaptation. In the Cloverway English adaptation, her named is changed to Melanie and she is voiced by Mary Long in episodes 135 and 143 and Tanya Donato from episodes 150 to 157, she is later voiced by Debi Derryberry in the Viz Media English adaptation.

==== Kyusuke Sarashina ====
Kyusuke Sarashina (更科 九助, Sarashina Kyūsuke) is an athletic and sarcastic boy who attends elementary school with Chibiusa and Momoko and is the younger brother of Kotono Sarashina. He makes recurring appearances in Sailor Moon SuperS, and is targeted by Amazoness JunJun in episode 155. He later appears when Chibiusa befriends a boy named Hiroki, who is trying to build a flying machine. While Kyūsuke is initially resentful of Hiroki and how impressed Chibiusa is with Hiroki's dream, Kyūsuke encourages Hiroki to continue building the flying machine after multiple failed attempts. In Japanese, he is voiced by Kazumi Okushima in Sailor Moon R, by Daisuke Sakaguchi in Sailor Moon SuperS and by Yukiko Morishita in Sailor Moon Crystal. In English, he is voiced by Nicola St. John in the DIC/Cloverway English adaptation, where his name is changed to Kelly, and by Kyle Hebert and Cristina Vee as a child in the Viz English dub.

=== Hikawa Shrine ===
The Hikawa Shrine (火川神社, Hikawa Jinja; called Cherry Hill Temple in the original English dub) is a Shinto shrine at which Rei Hino and her grandfather live and work. It features prominently in the series, since the Sailor Guardians and the cats often meet there to discuss strategies.

==== Rei's Grandfather ====
Rei's grandfather (レイの祖父, Rei no sofu) (Note: Also called Rei no ojiisan (レイのおじいさん)) is the Shinto priest of the Hikawa Shrine. In the anime, he has a different physical appearance and has a more prominent role as one of the holders of the Rainbow Crystals that make up the Silver Crystal. He often flirts with anyone, regardless of their gender. In Japanese, he is voiced by Tomomichi Nishimura in the first anime adaptation and by Hirohiko Kakegawa in Sailor Moon Eternal. In English, he is voiced by David Fraser in the DIC/Cloverway English adaptation, by John Stocker as a stand-in in Sailor Moon S episode 99, by Michael Sorich in the Viz Media English adaptation, and by Todd Haberkorn in Sailor Moon Eternal.

==== Yuichiro Kumada ====
Yuichiro Kumada (熊田 雄一郎, Kumada Yūichirō; called Chad Holdenford in the original English dub) is an anime-only character who helps out at the Hikawa Shrine. His family is very rich and has a mountain lodge, where he takes Rei and her friends for skiing. After falling in love with Rei, Yūichirō decides to stay at Hikawa Shrine to be near her. Despite her not reciprocating his love, he remains faithful to her and tries to protect her, with her warming up to his personality over time. In Japanese, he is voiced by Bin Shimada in the first anime series. In English, he is voiced by Steven Bednarski in the DIC/Cloverway English adaptation, by David Berni in Sailor Moon S, by Jason Barr in Sailor Moon SuperS) and by Wally Wingert in the Viz Media English adaption.

==== Phobos and Deimos ====
Phobos (フォボス, Fobosu) and Deimos (ディモス, Dimosu) are Rei's pet crows that live at the shrine, which she named after the two moons of Mars. They have the ability to sense evil, and sometimes attack enemies. It is revealed that when Rei was a child, they "told" her their names. Eventually, they reveal their small humanoid sprite forms, charged with guarding Sailor Mars. They save Sailor Mars from being killed by the Tiger's Eye and give a Sailor Crystal to her. They are later revealed to be from the planet Coronis when they encounter Sailor Lead Crow, who is also from Coronis. They have Star Seeds on a level near or equal to a Sailor Crystal, and die after Lead Crow steals them. In the live-action series, they appear only in the third episode. In the Another Story video game, they accompany her in the search for Jadeite's stone. A fake Deimos and Phobos appear in crow form in the musical Sailor Moon S – Usagi – Ai no Senshi e no Michi, where they are portrayed by male actors in animal costumes.

In Eternal and Cosmos, Phobos and Deimos are voiced by Kanami Taguchi and Aya Yamane respectively, and by Xanthe Huynh and Kelly Baskin respectively for the English dub.

=== Other humans ===
==== Motoki Furuhata ====
Motoki Furuhata (古幡 元基, Furuhata Motoki; called Andrew Hansford in the original English dub) works at the Crown Game Center, a video arcade Usagi frequently visits, which she calls him "Big Brother" Motoki (元基お兄さん, Motoki-oniisan), and at the Crown Fruit Parlor, and is also a KO University student. After he recognizes the Sailor Guardians and learns their true identities, he vows to keep their identities secret. He is naive, as he says that he views the girls as younger sisters and is oblivious to the fact that they have crushes on him. He has a little sister, Unazuki Furuhata, who is friends with Usagi and the others. He is friends with Reika Nishimura, a science student, and they both knew Setsuna when she studied at their university.

In the anime adaptation, Usagi has a crush on him in the beginning of the series, and he, Mamoru and Reika attend the Azabu Institute of Technology, as well as the latter being his girlfriend. In the live-action series, the Crown Center is a karaoke parlor. There is an initial flirtatious relationship between Motoki and Makoto until it intensifies, and in the Special Act, which takes place four years after the series finale, Motoki proposes to Makoto, who accepts.

In Japanese, Motoki is voiced by Hiroyuki Satō in Sailor Moon and by Hiroshi Okamoto in Crystal. In English, he is voiced by Colin O'Meara in the DIC English adaptation, by Steven Bednarski in the Cloverway dub, and by Lucien Dodge in the Viz Media English adaptation. He is portrayed by Masaya Kikawada in the live-action series.

==== Reika Nishimura ====
Reika Nishimura (西村 レイカ, Nishimura Reika; called Rita Blake in the original English dub) is Motoki Furuhata's friend and fellow student at KO University, where she later befriends Setsuna Meioh. In the anime, she is Motoki's girlfriend and also attend Azabu Institute of Technology. She is also the reincarnation of the Great Monster Rikokeidā. After leaving Japan twice to study abroad, she eventually leaves the country for 10 years, but Motoki is still willing to wait for her. In Japanese, she is voiced by Rika Fukami in the original series and by Mai Nakahara in Crystal. In English, she is voiced by Wendy Lyon and Lindsay Collins in the DIC English adaptation, by Sara Sahr in the Cloverway dub, and by Erica Mendez in the Viz Media English adaptation.

==== Unazuki Furuhata ====
Unazuki Furuhata (古幡 宇奈月, Furuhata Unazuki; called Elizabeth "Lizzie" Hansford in the original English dub) is Motoki Furuhata's younger sister, who works as a waitress at the Crown Fruit Parlor and attends T•A Private Girls School with Rei Hino. She first appears sporadically, with her initial appearance being in Sailor Moon R as a mistaken love rival for Mamoru Chiba. She dreams of her first kiss in Sailor Moon S, which results in her being targeted by the Death Busters. Unazuki appears more frequently in SuperS as a major supporting character who is usually among Usagi's group. In Japanese, she is voiced by Miyako Endō in the first series, with Eriko Hara as a stand-in on episode 94. In English, she is voiced by Sabrina Grdevich in the DIC English adaptation. In the Cloverway dub, she is voiced by Catherine Disher in Sailor Moon S and Kim Bubbs in SuperS. In the Viz Media English adaptation she is voiced by Veronica Taylor.

==== Kotono Sarashina ====
Kotono Sarashina (更科 琴乃, Sarashina Kotono) is Kyusuke Sarashina's elder sister and a student at T•A Academy for Girls, where she is the president of its Supernatural Research Club. Like many students at T•A, she seems to have an admiration for Rei Hino. She first appeared in Act 15, when the disguised Kōan created a rival club with a fortune-telling booth at the school festival. She made a Sailor V button for her brother, which Kyusuke refused to get for Chibiusa despite her liking it. However, after they help defeat the vampire Lilica Hubert, he has Kotono make a Sailor Moon button for her as well. She is voiced by Akemi Kanda in Sailor Moon Crystal and by Tara Sands in the Viz Media English dub.

==== Ittou Asanuma ====
Ittou Asanuma (浅沼 一等, Asanuma Ittō) is introduced in the Black Moon arc of the manga as Makoto's friend, who is interested in science fiction, UFOs and local paranormal activity. He greatly respects Mamoru, who is an upperclassman at his school. Asanuma initially thinks that the Sailor Guardians are aliens, but after he hears Luna talk, Makoto confesses the Guardians' identities to him. Asanuma is later attacked by Ayakashi sister Calaveras and rescued by Sailor Moon. At the beginning of the Infinity arc, he appears with Mamoru and Chibiusa in an amusement park, and in the Stars arc he gives Mamoru's phone number to Usagi when she is unable to locate him. Asanuma is briefly seen in the anime, looking for Mamoru when the latter is controlled by Queen Nehelenia. (Note: His name is seen in the credits of episode 169.) In Japanese, he is voiced by Kazuya Nakai in the original series and by Daisuke Sakaguchi in Crystal. In the Viz Media English dub, he is voiced by Greg Felden, except for Cosmos where he is voiced by Matthew Mercer.

=== Kinmoku ===
Kinmoku (キンモク星, Kinmokusei) is a fictional exoplanet which was home to its ruler, Princess Kakyuu, and her guardians, the Sailor Starlights, until it was attacked and destroyed by Sailor Galaxia. Most of the population of Kinmoku was wiped out during the attack, with the Starlights and Kakyuu being the only known surviving characters. Kinmoku is named for kinmokusei, the Japanese name for the Osmanthus fragrans.

==== Sailor Starlights ====
The Sailor Starlights (セーラースターライツ, Sērā Sutāraitsu) are a team of three Sailor Guardians: Sailor Star Fighter, Sailor Star Maker, and Sailor Star Healer. After the destruction of Kinmoku, they go on a quest to find their leader, Princess Kakyuu. On Earth, they take on the guise of a male pop band, the Three Lights, and use their music as a signal beacon for Kakyuu. In this form they take on the names Kou Seiya, Kou Taiki, and Kou Yaten. In the manga, they are always female and merely dress as males; in the anime, they physically transform into young men and are much more major characters. In both cases, Seiya develops romantic feelings for Usagi.

==== Princess Kakyuu ====
Princess Kakyuu (火球皇女, Kakyū Kōjo) (Note: Also simply referred to as Purinsesu Kakyū (プリンセス火球)) is the Princess of the Tankei Kingdom of Kinmoku. After Galaxia attacks and destroys Kinmoku, Kakyuu is injured and the Starlights lose contact with her. She travels to Earth after sensing the power of the Silver and Golden Crystal and hides in a censer guarded by Chibi-Chibi. She has her own Guardian form, Sailor Kakyuu, and later reveals to Sailor Moon that her lover died in the war against Galaxia. She eventually reunites with the Starlights and accompanies Sailor Moon to Zero Star Sagittarius to confront Galaxia, but Sailor Chi mortally wounds her and she dies in Sailor Moon's arms. As she is dying, she expresses her wish to be reborn in a world without war and to be with everyone again.

In the anime, Kakyuu goes to Earth to locate the "Light of Hope" and hide from Galaxia. While under Chibi-Chibi's care, she is aware of the Starlights searching for her, but cannot reveal herself too soon. She eventually saves Sailor Moon and the others from a black hole and resumes leadership of the Starlights. However, after Kakyuu is found, Galaxia steals her Star Seed, killing her. After Sailor Moon defeats Chaos, she is revived and, along with the Starlights, returns to Kinmoku to rebuild. Her Sailor Guardian form is never shown in this adaptation.

In Japanese, she is voiced by Sakiko Tamagawa in the original series and by Nana Mizuki in Cosmos. In English, she is voiced by Allegra Clark. In the musical version, she is portrayed by Sakoto Yoshioka, Ai Toyama and Asami Okamura.

=== Other nonhumans ===
==== Queen Serenity ====
Queen Serenity (クィーン・セレニティ, Kuīn Sereniti) is the incarnation of the moon goddess, Selene, with ancient Earth civilizations having known her as Selene. She was the mother of Sailor Moon in her past life as Princess Serenity and the queen regnant of the Moon, who reigned during the first Silver Millennium era. When the Dark Kingdom attacked the Moon Kingdom, she sacrificed herself to use the Silver Crystal to seal Queen Metaria and have her daughter, Endymion, and the Sailor Guardians reborn on Earth. Queen Serenity first appears as a hologram, having saved her spirit within a computer to preserve her will. She tells the five Sailor Guardians of their past lives, which they begin to remember as she describes them, and that they must find Queen Metaria, who escaped the thousand-year-old seal placed on her and gone into hiding on Earth. Afterwards, she only appears in flashbacks or as cameos.

In the thirteen-episode separate arc of Sailor Moon R preceding the Black Moon saga, a vision of Queen Serenity gives Usagi her second transformation brooch, the Crystal Star, as well as the mystical Cutie Moon Rod as her new weapon. She also appears in the forty-episode live-action series's special episode, "We're Getting Married!", which also adapted the Dark Kingdom saga.

In Japanese, she is voiced by Mika Doi in the first anime series and by Mami Koyama in Sailor Moon Crystal. In English, she is voiced by Barbara Radecki in the premiere of the Cloverway English adaptation and later by Wendy Lyon, and by Wendee Lee in the Viz Media English adaptation. In the live-action series, she is portrayed by Miyu Sawai, with her voice dubbed over by Yōko Sōmi.

==== Helios / Pegasus ====
Helios (祭司エリオス, Saiji Eriosu) is the Guardian Priest of Elysion, a sacred land within Earth that protects it and was the original location of the Golden Kingdom before it rose to the surface. When the Dead Moon Circus conquered Elysion, Helios was captured and Queen Nelehenia transformed him into the alicorn Pegasus (一角天馬(ペガサス), Pegasasu). Helios remembered a vision of a maiden who would save Elysion and astral projected his Pegasus form to the surface, where he assumed Chibiusa to be this maiden while providing her and Usagi with information and weapons. He becomes close to Chibiusa despite her insistence that Usagi is the maiden he seeks, eventually revealing his true form and that Endymion's condition is connected to the curse Nehelenia inflicted on Elysion. After sacrificing himself to give the Sailor Guardians a fighting chance against Zirconia, Chibiusa revives him and he returns them to the surface before promising her they will meet again.

In Sailor Moon SuperS, Helios guards the Golden Crystal, which protects the dreams of Earth's people, and draws power and strength from these dreams. After Nehelenia attacks him seeking the Crystal for herself, Helios leaves his body to flee with the Crystal. Taking on the form of the mythical Pegasus, he places the Crystal on his forehead as a horn and hides in Chibiusa's dreams. There, he asks for her help and grants power to her and her allies through special items. Though he does not trust Chibiusa at first, they gradually develop a connection, and he ultimately reveals his secrets to her by revealing his world of Elysion and his true form and name.

In Japanese, he is voiced by Taiki Matsuno in Sailor Moon and by Yoshitsugu Matsuoka in Sailor Moon Eternal. In English, he is voiced by Rowan Tichenor in the Cloverway English adaptation, by Chris Niosi in the Viz Media English adaptation, and by Brian Beacock in Sailor Moon Eternal. In the musicals, Pegasus is voiced by Yuta Enomoto.

Takeuchi stated that she was dissatisfied with Helios' attire, having created his outfit quickly because it was easy to draw and she was pressed for time. She describes the result as "ugly" and "a disaster", commenting that he inherited his "irresponsible ways" from herself.

==== Chibi-Chibi ====
Chibi-Chibi (ちびちび) first appears in Act 51 of the manga and episode 182 of the anime. She is a young child and imitates the ends of others' sentences, mostly saying "chibi". She has red-pink hair worn in a hairstyle similar to Usagi's, being worn in heart-shaped odango with ringlets at the sides,. Her name is a doubling of the Japanese word chibi, meaning "small person" or "small child", and is also because of her similarity to Chibiusa. It is also a pun, as the word Chibi-Chibi means "making something last".

Chibi-Chibi is first shown floating down to Earth and appearing at the Tsukino house. In the anime, she first meets Usagi in the park and starts to follow her around, saying only "chibi chibi" without having been prompted. Chibi-Chibi attaches herself to Usagi's family, whose memories are modified so that they believe her to be the youngest child of the family, like how Chibiusa had made them believe she was her cousin. (Note: The only difference is that Chibiusa made them think she was Usagi's cousin instead of her younger sister.) Chibi-Chibi is the caretaker of a small ornate censer in which Princess Kakyuu is resting, hidden from Sailor Galaxia. Eventually, she uses her own power to transform into her Sailor Guardian form, Sailor Chibi-Chibi Moon (セーラーちびちびムーン, Sērā Chibi-Chibi Mūn). In her Sailor Guardian form, she wields a heart scepter and uses it to defend herself and Sailor Moon, but is not shown using attacks of her own. Her childlike form is a disguise for Sailor Cosmos, a powerful Sailor Guardian who is the future version of Sailor Moon.

In the anime, Chibi-Chibi is Galaxia's Star Seed, who had once been a great force for good. When Galaxia fought Chaos, she defeated it by sealing it inside her own body. To prevent her Star Seed from being corrupted, she sent it away to Earth, where it became Chibi-Chibi. The Starlights refer to Chibi-Chibi as the "light of hope" (希望の光, kibō no hikari), as she is their final hope to defeat Galaxia. Ultimately, Chibi-Chibi transforms into the Sword of Sealing (封印の剣, Fuuin no Ken), (Note: Called the Sword of Galaxia in the Viz Media dub.) which Galaxia had used to seal away Chaos, and asks Sailor Moon to use it to defeat them. During the battle, Galaxia shatters the sword, killing Chibi-Chibi. However, she is revived along with the other fallen Sailor Guardians after Sailor Moon cleanses Galaxia of Chaos.

In the stage musicals, her backstory follows that of the anime and she is given her own song, "Mou ii no" (English: It's All Right), which she sings to announce that she has come to rejoin Galaxia.

Chibi-Chibi is voiced by Kotono Mitsuishi in Japanese and by Stephanie Sheh in English. In the stage musicals, she has been portrayed by Mao Kawasaki, Mikiko Asuke, Yuka Gouchou and Mina Horita. Takeuchi praised Kawasaki's cuteness as Chibi-Chibi.

== Merchandise ==
Differences in character between the Sailor Guardians mirror differences in their hairstyles, fashion and magical items, which has translated well into doll lines. Sales of the Sailor Guardians fashion dolls overtook those of Licca-chan in the 1990s. Mattel attributed this to the "fashion-action" blend of the Sailor Moon storyline; doll accessories included both fashion items and the Guardian's weapons. The first line of dolls included Queen Beryl, the first major antagonist of the series, a decision that was described as a "radical idea". Bandai introduced a line of little dolls that included the Amazoness Quartet and, according to Takeuchi, these were their favorite because "with their costumes and faithfulness to the originals, the dolls really excelled." Bandai has released several S.H. Figuarts based on the characters' appearances from the first anime adaptation. Among those figures are the Sailor Guardians, Tuxedo Mask and Black Lady. In early 2014, Megahouse released a set of trading figures consisting of twelve figurines, two for each Sailor Guardian and two for Tuxedo Mask.

Several characters, including Sailor Guardians, villains, supporting characters, and monsters of the day are featured in a collectible card game which was released in 2000 by Dart Flipcards. A collaboration between Sailor Moon and Capcom took place in March 2018 as part of the 25th anniversary celebration of the Sailor Moon franchise. In this collaboration, the Felyne cat companion resembles Luna and wields Usagi's Cutie Moon Rod weapon in the Monster Hunter XX expansion of Monster Hunter Generations. Another collaboration with Arena of Valor features character skins of Eternal Sailor Moon, Tuxedo Mask, and Sailor Chibi Moon for Diaochan, Eland'orr, and Alice respectively.

== Reception ==
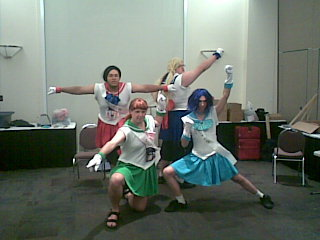
The Sailor Guardian uniform is a popular choice for male-to-female crossplayers, creating "humorous effect and social levity" at conventions. Here, a group of males dressed as Sailor Moon and the Sailor Guardians strike a pose from the Ginyu Force of Dragon Ball.

Sailor Moon has been described largely in terms of its characters; a sustained 18-volume narrative about a group of young heroines who are simultaneously heroic and introspective, active and emotional, dutiful and ambitious. The combination proved extremely successful, and Sailor Moon became internationally popular in both manga and anime formats.

The function of the Sailor Guardians themselves has been analyzed by critics, often in terms of feminist theory. Susan J. Napier described the Sailor Guardians as "powerful, yet childlike", and suggested that this is because Sailor Moon is aimed towards an audience of young girls. She stated that the Sailor Guardians readily accept their powers and destinies and do not agonize over them, which can be read as an expression of female power and success. The Sailor Guardians have been described as merging male and female traits, being both charming and powerful. They are significantly different from the sexless representation of 1980s teen heroines such as Nausicaä. Anne Allison noted that the use of the sailor fuku as a costume makes it easy for girls to identify with the Sailor Guardians, which could differ for men. Unlike the female Power Rangers, who as the series go on become more unisex in both costume and poses, the Sailor Guardians' costumes become frillier and more "feminine".

The Sailor Guardians are associated with the feminist movement and employ feminist concepts. Mary Grigsby considered that the Sailor Guardians blend ancient characteristics and symbols of femininity with modern ideas, reminding the audience of a pre-modern time when females were equal to males, but other critics drew parallels with the modern character type of the aggressive cyborg woman, pointing out that the Sailor Guardians are augmented by their magical equipment. Much of the Sailor Guardians' strength stems from their reliance and friendship with other girls rather than from men.

Kazuko Minomiya has described the daily lives of the girls within the series as risoukyou, or "utopic". They are shown as enjoying many leisure activities such as shopping, visiting amusement parks and hanging out at the Crown Arcade. According to Allison, Minomiya points out that the depiction of life is harder and more serious for male superheroes. The characters "double" as ordinary girls and as "celestially-empowered superheroes". The "highly stylized" transformation that the Sailor Guardians go through has been said to "symbolically separate" the negative aspects of the characters (laziness, for example) and the positive aspects of the superheroine, and gives each girl her unique uniform and "a set of individual powers". Some commentators have read the transformation of the Sailor Guardians as symbolic of puberty, as cosmetics appear on the Guardians and their uniforms highlight slim waists and long legs, which "outright force the pun on heavenly bodies".

Jason Thompson found the Sailor Moon anime reinvigorated the magical girl genre by adding dynamic heroines and action-oriented plots. Following its success, similar series, such Magic Knight Rayearth, Akazukin Chacha, Wedding Peach, Nurse Angel Ririka SOS, Revolutionary Girl Utena, Fushigi Yûgi and Pretty Cure, emerged.
