= One-shot (comics) =

Type of comic book

In comics, a one-shot is a work composed of a single standalone issue or chapter, contrasting a limited series or ongoing series, which are composed of multiple issues or chapters. One-shots date back to the early 19th century, published in newspapers, and today may be in the form of single published comic books, parts of comic magazines/anthologies or published online on websites. In the marketing industry, some one-shots are used as promotion tools that tie in with existing productions, films, video games or television shows.

== Overview ==
In the Japanese manga industry, one-shots are called yomikiri (読み切り), a term which implies that the comic is presented in its entirety without any continuation. One-shot manga are often written for contests, and sometimes later developed into a full-length series, much like a television pilot. Many popular manga series began as one-shots, such as Dragon Ball, Fist of the North Star, Sailor Moon (whose one-shot would become its sister series, Codename: Sailor V), Naruto, Bleach, One Piece, Berserk, Kinnikuman, Attack on Titan and Death Note. Rising Stars of Manga was an annual competition for original English-language one-shot manga, many of which have gone on to become full-length manga series. Some noted manga authors, such as Akira Toriyama and Rumiko Takahashi, have worked on numerous one-shot stories in addition to their serialized works.

In the United States, one-shots are usually labeled with a "#1" despite there being no following issues, and are sometimes subtitled as "specials". On occasion, a character or concept will appear in a series of one-shots, in cases where the subject matter is not financially lucrative enough to merit an ongoing or limited series, but still popular enough to be published on a regular basis, often annually or quarterly. A current example of a series of one-shots would be Marvel Comics' Franklin Richards: Son of a Genius publications. This type of one-shot is not to be confused with a comic book annual, which is typically a companion publication to an established ongoing series.

The term has also been borrowed into the Franco-Belgian comics industry, with basically the same meaning, although there it mostly refers to comic albums.

== One-shot manga ==
The comic art histories of different countries and regions are following divergent paths. Japanese early comic art or manga took its rise from the 12th century and developed from Chōjū-jinbutsu-giga ("Animal-person Caricatures"), went so far as to ukiyo-e ("floating world") in the 17th century. Western-style humour comics and caricatures had been introduced into Japan in the late 19th century and impacted on the styles of comic art. On the other hand, the significant development of modern era Japanese comic art was arising in the aftermath of World War II and further developed into diversified genres. By the late 2000s, almost a quarter of all printed materials in Japan were in forms of manga, while the audience spread out across all age groups.

Most modern era one-shot manga (yomikiri 読み切り) have independent settings, characters, and storylines, rather than sharing them with existing works. In Japan and other Asian countries, some one-shot manga are more like takeoff boards to determine the popularity among the audience. The format of a one-shot manga could be changed if it has a broad market prospect, so that:

1. a one-shot manga could become a serialized continuing manga after adapting;
2. a one-shot manga could develop into a series of one-shot manga or serial manga, which are sharing the same world set and character design, but in different story lines; and
3. side stories could derive from the original one-shot manga, such as a prequel, a sequel, and an antagonist or supporting role's side story.

== One-shot Western comics ==
The prototype comic works in Western countries were pamphlets, giveaways, or Sunday newspaper comic sections in the 19th century. These were then developed and published as comic magazines which were distributed with the newspapers sales on newsstands. On the other hand, graphic books in America were also viewed as developing from pamphlets that sold on newsstands. Comics were not highly regarded in the early market, for example, during the Depression comics were used to increase the sales of newspapers and some other products in the United States. Most of the comics were one-shot comics before the rise of long continuities in newspaper strips. After some early developments, weekly comic magazines became the major way of dissemination in European comic markets. Influenced by the chaos of social revolutions and changings in the 20th century, Western alternative comic art was quickly developed as well as 1970s and 1980s' America. Also, America has stirred up a spree of superhero comics since 1930s, and this comic form is still dominating the comic market.

=== The 19th and early 20th century ===
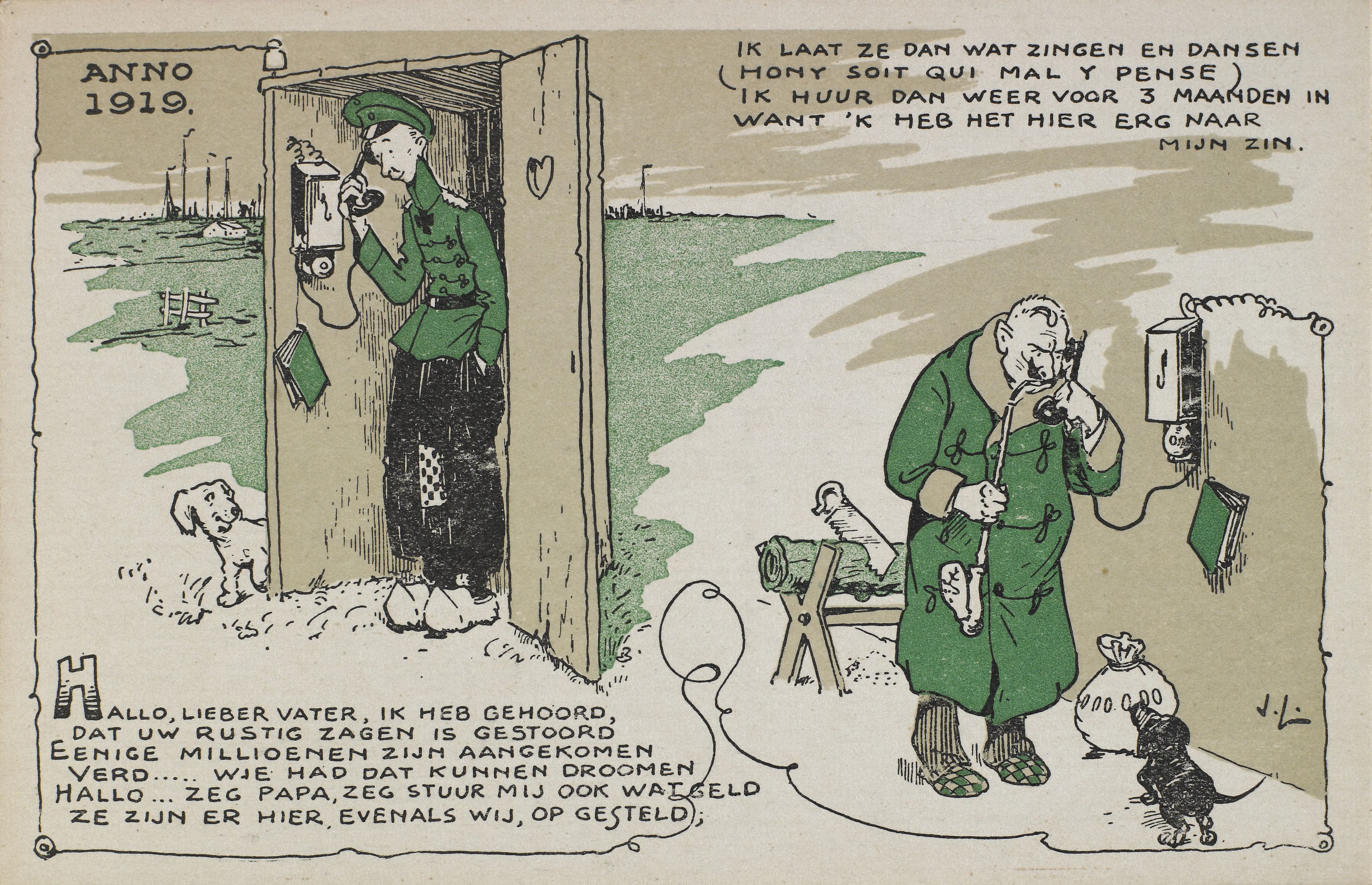
1919 Dutch caricature Anno 1919

In this period, comic strips and magazines were the major reading formats that had been leading the markets. Divergent genres such as humour, caricature, and horror were dominant forms of comics in that time. In the very beginning, magazines were divided from the comic supplements of newspapers within a decade of their first appearance in America. On the other side of the coin, in Europe, magazine format was developed as a comic supplement of newspapers along European features and never lost the identification.

=== Modern era one-shot comics ===
Since the 1930s, a specific the Superhero comics became a dominant genre, impacting the comics markets in other countries. Most published comic books during this period were anthologies featuring single, standalone stories rather than serialized ones, often featuring a single popular protagonist. This model remained the dominant one into the 2000s, both in the U.S. and European markets, with DC Comics and Marvel Comics emerging as the Big Two in the former. Around the late 1960s- mid-1970s, due to the dislocations of social developments, alternative underground comix traditions developed, which used the medium as a method for radical change. Japanese comics also increased in popularity as Japanese-style anthologies were published in the United States.

== See also ==
- Four Color – an anthology series from Dell Comics (1939–1962) that featured many issues that were designated as "one shots".
