= Momoko Shibuya =

Japanese actress

Momoko Shibuya (渋谷 桃子, Shibuya Momoko, born 15 March 1987 in Kanagawa Prefecture) is a Japanese actress. Shibuya debuted as a model when she was one year old. She has played the role of Minako Aino in the Sailor Moon musicals.

== Filmography ==
- Ugly Duckling (1996)
- Himawari (2000)
- Swan Song (2002)
- Otasuke Girl (2003)

Preceded by Mizuki Watanabe	Minako Aino/Sailor Venus in the Sailor Moon musicals 2003-2004	Succeeded by Erica
