= Miss Zombie =

2013 Japanese horror film

- Directed by: Sabu
- Produced by: Yoshiki Kumazawa; Satake Kazumi
- Release date: September 9, 2013
- Running time: 85 minutes
- Country: Japan
- Language: Japanese

Miss Zombie (ミス・ゾンビ, Misu zonbi) is a Japanese dystopian horror film directed by Sabu, produced by Yoshiki Kumazawa and Satake Kazumi. It tells the story of a female zombie's reduction to slavery in a future, post-apocalyptic Japan where zombies are captured and domesticated as servants and pets to humans; the film chronicles her ordeals and retaliation against the wealthy family that bought her. The film premièred at the Busan International Film Festival in South Korea on 5 October 2013, and won the Grand Prix at the Festival international du film fantastique de Gérardmer in France on 3 February 2014.

== Synopsis ==
In a future, dystopian Japan, zombies are captured and sold to wealthy families to serve as butler-slaves through an organization that deals with this. Scientists have finally figured out how to eliminate their hunger and their ferocity: no longer giving them meat and only fruit and vegetables. The undead also have levels and the lower the level the more human they are. A young zombie woman (Miss Zombie) is given to a wealthy family formed by Dr. Teramoto, his wife Shizuko, and his son Kenechi. The non-human seems not to have lost her mind due to her low virus level and she still remembers the moment she lost her child when she was still in her womb. The woman becomes the pet of the family, doing whatever they order. In the evening, after receiving her "dinner", she walks through the streets of the city, teased by everyone, in order to return to her small house to eat her food, including, she also finds a white flower given to her by Shizuko.

The days pass, and Miss Zombie keeps all the flowers that are given to her by the woman of the house as she also keeps the weapons with which she is attacked by the citizens of the city. When she is raped by some shady guys who work near Teramoto's house, Teramoto sees everything and is shocked. Kenechi dies in an accident on a lake and Shizuko, in order not to lose her son, has the zombie bite him to turn him into an undead. The child awakens, but instead of embracing his birth mother, he holds the undead in her arms, recognizing her as her only parent. For this reason, the woman of the house begins to hate the zombie, and her hatred increases when she learns that Teramoto has also fallen madly in love with her. Moreover, Miss Zombie seems to have found her agility again and for this, she takes revenge on all those who had abused her up to that moment, and with their blood she prepares the bottles to feed Kenechi.

Shizuko, tired of Miss Zombie, decides to kill her by shooting her with the gun, but she accidentally hits Dr. Teramoto, killing him. The undead, hearing the shot, runs away and takes Kenechi with her. The woman pursues them, killing anyone who comes within range, including the rapists of the undead. Shizuko manages to reach the two, but she sees the way in which Kenechi has become attached to Miss Zombie and before her, starts a desperate cry and then commits suicide for the abandonment of her son. Kenechi, seeing his mother's suicide comes back, and the undead decides to turn her into a zombie too. Mother and son can finally hug, while Miss Zombie puts a gun to her head and commits suicide, tired of the oppression of that world.

== Cast ==
- Toru Tezuka as Dr. Teramoto
- Ayaka Komatsu as Shara
- Makoto Togashi as Shizuko, Teramoto's wife
- Riku Onishi as Kenichi, Teramoto's young son
- Taro Suruga
- Tateto Serizawa
- Takaya Yamauchi

== Critical reception ==
The film was reviewed favourably by the American magazine Variety: "The low-budget film suggests a cross between Lucky McKee's The Woman and Jonathan Levine's Warm Bodies, Miss Zombie's exploitation by her "owners" even recalls recent realist dramas about foreign domestic helpers (some scenarios are almost identical to those in Cannes Camera d'Or winner Ilo Ilo). [...] Komatsu (Shara) interprets the character's transformation — from a stiff, marionette-like figure to someone driven by love and altruism — with a sullen intensity made even more effective by her lack of dialogue. Komatsu made her name as a "gravure idol" (a particular type of pin-up girl in Japan), "and some of her scenes with Teramoto cheekily channel certain genres of Japanese erotica."

== See also ==
- Gender inequality in Japan
- Human trafficking in Japan
- Japanese horror
- List of apocalyptic films
- Women in Japan
