= Sailor Venus =

Fictional character in manga series

- Pretty Soldier Sailor Moon and Codename: Sailor V character
- Minako in her Super Sailor Venus form as seen in Sailor Moon SuperS
- First appearance: Codename: Sailor V: "Sailor V Arrives! - [Channel 44] Pandora's Ambition" (August 3, 1991)
- Created by: Naoko Takeuchi
- Voiced by: Japanese: Rika Fukami; Shizuka Itō (Sailor Moon Crystal); English: Stephanie Morgenstern (DiC dub); Emilie-Claire Barlow (CWi dub); Cherami Leigh (Viz Media dub)
- Portrayed by: Ayaka Komatsu (PGSM)
- Birthday: October 22

In-universe information
- Full name: Minako Aino
- Aliases: Sailor V Princess Venus; Princess Sailor Venus (PGSM)
- Nickname: Mina
- Weapon: Love-Me Chain; Holy Sword (manga and Sailor Moon Crystal)
- Family: Mr. Aino (father); Mrs. Aino (mother)
- Children: Mina Aino (daughter; "Parallel Sailor Moon" only)
- Nationality: Japanese
- Affiliations: Sailor Guardians; Shadow Galactica (manga and Sailor Moon Crystal)
- Powers and abilities: Light manipulation Minor atmospheric manipulation

Minako Aino (Japanese: 愛野 美奈子, Hepburn: Aino Minako; renamed "Mina Aino" in some English adaptations), better known as Sailor Venus (Japanese: セーラーヴィーナス, Hepburn: Sērā Vīnasu), is a fictional character in the Sailor Moon and Codename: Sailor V manga series written by Naoko Takeuchi. Minako is her sailor form's alternative human identity as leader of the Sailor Guardians, female supernatural fighters who protect the Solar System from evil.

Minako is the fourth Sailor Guardian to be discovered by Usagi Tsukino, although she was the first Sailor Guardian to awaken her powers, even before Usagi did. She possesses powers associated with love and beauty, light, and golden material metal. In the manga and anime series, she dreams of becoming a famous idol, but in the live-action series, her character is already a well-known celebrity.

Minako is introduced as the titular main protagonist of Naoko Takeuchi's much-shorter manga series Codename: Sailor V, the predecessor to Pretty Soldier Sailor Moon. In it (and the early part of Sailor Moon), she goes by the pseudonym Sailor V (セーラーV, Sērā V), short for "Venus", and is given a personal backstory. The plot lines of Sailor V are generally compatible with the latter series, but are usually considered separate. Later, she co-stars with Rei Hino in a special short story titled Rei and Minako's Girls School Battle.

== Profile ==
=== Manga and anime ===
Minako is first introduced in the Codename: Sailor V manga, of which she is the lead character. She is awakened as a Sailor Guardian by the white cat Artemis when she is thirteen years old and instructed that she has a duty to become the beautiful warrior, Sailor V. Artemis explains that Venus and Earth are "twin planets" of about the same size and weight, that Venus is her "mother star," and that she must protect Earth from its enemies. He shows her Magellan Castle orbiting around Venus and says that it is hers, although the existence of these castles is not revealed to the other Sailor Guardians until late in the Sailor Moon series. Artemis later reveals that Minako is an avatar of the goddess, Venus. She first dons her red hair bow during the first chapter of the story - on the recommendation of a handsome villain character that she defeats - and is almost never seen without it again.

Though Sailor Moon technically yet sometimes leads the team during the various incarnations of the franchise, she is actually not the team leader of the Sailor Guardians; instead, that honor goes to Sailor Venus. Minako is depicted as athletic, friendly, romantic, resilient, and intelligent. She is also seen as graceful, clever, and refined at times. Minako is supernaturally strong, being able to wield a heavy sword with just one hand and jumping from the ground to the top of a building in the '90s anime. Minako is as strong as Makoto, possibly even more than her, and like Sailor Mars, Minako also has large experience in hand-to-hand combat as she took on members of the "Dark Agency" in her own series Codename: Sailor V. When Codename: Sailor V was enough of a hit to earn its own anime adaptation, Takeuchi was asked to expand the concept to include more girls, and when she did, she placed Usagi Tsukino as the protagonist, with Minako as a part of the team.

Minako as depicted in manga, drawn by Naoko Takeuchi

In the anime only, Minako spends some of her time as Sailor V in London, where she meets a young Interpol officer named Katarina who taught her English and acts as a big sister, and a young man called Alan, with whom she falls in love. One day Sailor V was the first to enter an abandoned warehouse but she was caught in an explosion after a criminal threw a grenade and assumed to be dead, Minako survives but she was injured she saw Alan and Katarina together and realizes that they had become a couple. She moves back to Japan shortly thereafter. She is also widely traveled in the manga, having visited Greece and China.

As a result of her past battles, when Minako meets the other Sailor Guardians she has a relatively serious personality and is very focused on their mission as a Sailor Guardian. In the manga, she even tells them she is the princess they have been searching for, although in fact she is merely serving as a decoy to protect the real princess, Usagi. Throughout the first story arc she has by far the strongest memories of their past life during the time of Silver Millennium.

Artemis lives in Minako's home and is one of her closest friends. Minako lives with both her parents, although references to her family life are few in the Sailor Moon series. Her family, like Usagi's, is based on Takeuchi's own family. For the first several story arcs, Minako attends a different junior high school from the others in Shiba Kōen. When the characters enter high school, she joins Usagi, Ami, and Makoto at Azabu-Jūban. One of her greatest talent is volleyball, as shown from the beginning of the first Sailor V chapter and throughout the rest of the series — she even considers quitting the Sailor Guardians to become a professional, and in high school joins the Volleyball club. Her favorite class is Physical Education, while in the manga her least favorites are mathematics and the English language. In the anime, having lived in England for some time, she is fluent in the language (in one episode it is shown her skills are more refined than Ami Mizuno's), and Usagi begs Minako to teach her.

Minako's other greatest love is pop culture. She desperately wants to be an idol, and so makes a hobby of chasing them and attending auditions in acting, dancing, and singing whenever possible. She takes her role as the "Guardian of Love" literally, and enjoys regaling friends and acquaintances with advice about romance. Despite her declared expertise, Minako herself has little personal experience in relationships (aside from a brief and ill-fated love in the Sailor V manga), but is enthusiastic about romantic opportunities — even to the point of two-timing a pair of the series' villains. She has a crush on Yaten Kou throughout the Sailor Stars anime storyline, and in one episode, the sinister idea of herself as a cat bathing with Yaten gives her a nosebleed — a common symbol of sexual arousal in anime. In the manga, by contrast, Minako suspects Yaten of being an enemy; while confronting the Starlights, she and Rei reaffirm that they do not need men because they have dedicated their lives to their duty of protecting Usagi.

=== Live-action series ===
While Minako dreams of being an idol in the manga and anime adaptations, the live-action series Pretty Guardian Sailor Moon depicts her as a famous singer whose fanbase includes Usagi Tsukino in particular as an enormous fan. Her second album, newly released at the start of the series, is called Venus and her most popular song is "C'est La Vie", which is a Japanese pun: in Japanese (and, to some extent, in English as well), the French phrase and the name of her alter-ego, Sailor V, is pronounced almost identically (as sērāvī). Her first album, Imitation, was released prior to her meeting Artemis and becoming a Sailor Guardian, but its track listing, shown onscreen, foreshadows later plot developments: Origin of the Legend, Imitation, Don't Lose! Christmas Girl, Love Versus Dream, Happily, Secret!, Orange Heart, White Rendezvous, and Make Up! Power!!.

In the live-action series, Minako secretly leads a double life as idol and heroine—famous as a singer, and equally well-known as Sailor V. She remains entirely separate from the other girls, but is aware of each of their civilian identities. As in the other series, she eventually discards the guise of Sailor V in favor of her true form, Sailor Venus; nevertheless, she becomes only slightly involved with the others, and frequently expresses disapproval of their effectiveness as Guardians. She is frustrated by their lack of focus and distances herself both for that reason and because, as revealed later, she has a terminal illness and does not want them to become close to her and then be saddened by her probable death.

When the other Guardians learn that Minako and Sailor V are the same person, they hide it from the irresponsible Usagi for some time. The character Minako is closest to being friends with is Rei Hino, with whom she has a conflicted relationship. Rei is supposed to be the secondary leader, but she is initially both less skilled than Minako and resentful of her advice. Although they often disagree and compete, they develop great respect for each other, to the point where Minako sometimes lets her guard down, and eventually confides to Rei about both her illness and what she feels is her destiny as a Sailor Soldier.

In terms of personality, the live-action Minako is deeply solemn and rarely smiles. Besides the complications from her unnamed illness (the doctors in one episode give her six months to live), her obsession with the collective past life makes her feel detached from the world, thinking of her current life as less important. However, she does seem to genuinely love singing, and shows a small mischievous side, especially in her relationship with Artemis.

As in the manga, she serves as a decoy Moon Princess for part of the series. She seems to be aware of her true position, often endangering herself to protect the real princess, Sailor Moon. In a twist, Usagi serves as a decoy of Minako, chasing away a group of autograph hounds. She does this because she figures Minako needed to be away from the trappings of stardom for a while. Minako is touched by this and cares about Usagi as a friend to the point of trying to protect her from Mio (whom she suspected is working with the Dark Kingdom to hurt Usagi).

Near the end of the series, it is revealed that there is a surgery that might either correct Minako's condition or kill her early. She refuses to undergo the procedure, preferring to last as long as she can without it, but the other girls convince her to take any chance at life she can get. She is shown leaving for the hospital, and later that day, Artemis arrives at Rei's temple to tell the girls that Minako has died. She did, however, leave each of them a note giving her goodbyes. Rei uses Minako's weapon, Venus Dagger, in conjunction with her own Mars Dagger in the final battle. Though Minako dies before the final battle, Usagi's use of the Silver Crystal in the finale gives her a second chance at life. This allows her to take part in the battle in the direct-to-DVD special, in which she uses her own weapon as well as Rei's (who is in the hospital) in combat.

== Aspects and forms ==
As a character with different incarnations, special powers, transformations, and a long lifetime virtually spanned between the Silver Millennium era and the 30th century, Minako gains multiple aspects and aliases as the series progresses.

=== Sailor Venus ===
Minako's primary Sailor Guardian identity is that of Sailor Venus. Sailor Venus wears a sailor suit colored in orange (choker, collar, center of front bow, elbow fittings on her gloves, skirt, earrings, and a matching set of orange ankle-strap heels), navy blue (front bow) and yellow (tiara gem and back bow), and retains the red bow she wears as a civilian. In the live-action series, this bow appears only when she is in one of her Guardian forms, and has a gem in the center. In the manga, live-action series, and Sailor Moon Crystal, she wears an item called the Wink Chain around her waist, which she sometimes uses as a weapon. She is given specific titles throughout the various series, including Guardian of Love, Guardian of Love and Hope, and Guardian of Light and Beauty. Her personality is no different from when she is a civilian, although she must be Sailor Venus to access her celestial powers.

In Japanese, the name for the planet Venus is Kinsei (金星), the first kanji indicating a metal, especially gold, and the second indicating a celestial object. Unlike the other Sailor Guardians, her special abilities are not derived from the element in her planet's name but are instead based on the concept of love, a reference to the Roman goddess of love, Venus, and the Mesopotamian goddess of love and war, Inanna, who has also deemed the personification of the planet Venus. Metal does appear in her use of a special chain as a weapon, and she also has a few attacks with "crescent" in their names, mainly acquired during her time as Sailor V.

Sailor Venus is the de jure leader of the Sailor Guardians in their mission to protect Princess Serenity. In the manga, as the leader, she is entrusted with the poisonous sword used to kill Queen Beryl, which turns the stone blade into a sword made of Silver Crystal.

In the live-action series only, upon her introduction, Sailor Venus's sailor suit is slightly different, in order to represent her disguise as the Moon Princess. She bears the crescent moon symbol on her forehead in place of a tiara (just as she did when she was Sailor V) and wears a crown with a fake Silver Crystal on it. The latter disappears after the gem is revealed to be a fake, and she gains a normal tiara when Usagi is revealed as the real princess. Other characters refer to her in this form as Princess Sailor Venus. In the manga, she does not have a different title or a crown, but she does retain the crescent moon on her forehead until Usagi is revealed as the princess.

As she grows stronger, Sailor Venus gains additional powers, and at key points her uniform changes to reflect this. The first takes place in Act 43 of the manga when she obtains the Venus Crystal and her outfit becomes similar to that of Super Sailor Moon. She is not given a new title. A similar event is divided between Episodes 143 and 154 of the anime, and she is given the name Super Sailor Venus. A third form appears in Act 49 of the manga, unnamed but similar to Eternal Sailor Moon (without wings). In the official visual book for Sailor Moon Eternal, this form was named "Eternal Sailor Venus".

=== Princess Venus ===
In Silver Millennium, Sailor Venus was also the Princess of her home planet. She was the leader of those who protected Princess Serenity of the Moon Kingdom. As Princess Venus, she dwelt in Magellan Castle and wore a yellow gown—she appears in this form in the original manga, as well as in supplementary art. In Codename: Sailor V, it is shown that she was loved by Adonis, a foot soldier in her army, who was later under the command of Endymion. His love went unnoticed by her, and he became a villain working for the Dark Agency after he was reborn.

Takeuchi once drew her in the arms of Kunzite, leader of the Four Kings of Heaven. In the Original Picture Collection Vol. I, Takeuchi expresses a desire to explore the possibility of such relationships; unlike the other characters, with Venus and Kunzite this is explored within the series. In one flashback, Minako blushes and seems flustered around Kunzite after a conversation about love, and in the last chapter of Codename: Sailor V, Princess Venus is shown as having had an infatuation with Kunzite. In Sailor Moon Crystal it is established that Sailor Venus and Kunzite were in love at the time of the Moon Kingdom. This is also stated in the stage musicals, as well as in the Another Story video game.

=== Sailor V ===
A preliminary form, under which Minako fought alone before the other Sailor Guardians were awakened. She was used to distract the enemy into thinking she was the Moon Princess while trying to find the real one. She wore a different uniform under this name, most notably a red mask, and her appearance and powers incorporated the use of a crescent motif. In the early storyline of Sailor Moon, she is something of a celebrity figure, of whom Usagi Tsukino is a great fan. She called herself the Guardian of Justice. The V was short for Venus, and she would sometimes introduce herself as such, though no other character refers to this form as such. The form makes a return in two of Chibiusa's Picture Diary side stories, namely the first and third, set during the second and fourth story arcs. The former was likely chosen due to her knowing one of the people she was rescuing was a Sailor V fan, the use of it in the latter is entirely without explanation.

Because Minako's creation predates the Sailor Moon metaseries, some aspects of her character are slightly incompatible with the other Sailor Guardians. For example, her magical attacks lack the strict elemental rules: Venus is typically associated with metal in Chinese astrology, but her attacks are mostly light or love related. The incorporation of the "love element" comes from the Roman goddess Venus.

Sailor V's sailor suit is mostly blue and red and includes shoulder armor, quarter-length sleeves, and broad stripes of color. She wears a shirt rather than a leotard, as well as her characteristic red mask. Some of the details vary from version to version; in the manga and live-action series the shirt had sleeves and smooth gloves, but in the anime, it was sleeveless with ring-topped gloves. Occasionally in the manga, tiny, ornamental crescent moon charms were visible on the straps of the indigo high-heeled shoes accompanying this outfit, albeit the presence of these charms often varied from illustration to illustration. The anime added a second layer to her shoulder guards, omitted the crescent Moon that is normally visible on her forehead, and added a second stripe to her collar. In the live-action series, the bow on Sailor V's chest was made dark pink, like the red parts of Sailor Moon's costume, but her mask and hair bow are red.

== Special powers and items ==
Sailor Venus using Venus Love-Me Chain in Sailor Moon Crystal

Minako is portrayed to have borderline superpower abilities in civilian form, such as jumping to the room of Usagi's house from ground level in a single jump and outrunning a car after having her Pure Heart Crystal extracted from her body (something that had previously instantly knocked out the other Sailor Guardians and would later kill Neptune and Uranus). Despite this, like the other Sailor Guardians, she must transform in order to gain access to her special powers. To transform into Sailor Venus, she must first raise a special device (pen, bracelet, wand, or crystal) into the air and shout a special phrase, originally "Venus Power, Make-up!" (Note: In the DIC and Cloverway dubs, Minako does not say 'Make up' when transforming.) As she becomes more powerful and obtains new transformation devices, this phrase changes to evoke Venus Star, Planet, or Crystal Power.

In the original anime, Sailor Venus's transformation sequence evolves slightly over time, whether to update the background images or to accommodate changes to her uniform or a new transformation device, but the animations all involve a ribbon of stars which she whips around to form her outfit. The new anime has her first and second transformations involving orange ribbons, her third involving stars that she envelopes herself in and the fourth involving both.

Minako's transformations into Sailor V are not clearly shown—in the Sailor V manga; she raises her transformation pen and shouts the phrase Moon Power Transform. By saying the word Crescent first, she can take on a disguise using her Crescent Compact, and this is used in the Sailor Moon manga as well. In the live-action series she is shown storing her uniform in a suitcase, but she is also shown changing instantaneously into Sailor V while running down the street. Although her true identity as Sailor Venus takes precedence over her temporary Sailor V guise, in her own manga series she used a number of powers unique to the form. Her most important item was the Crescent Compact, which she used to gain energy for her primary attack, Crescent Beam (a beam of light which strikes enemies). (Note: This was upgraded to Crescent Super Beam and Crescent Slender Beam, and once adapted into a melting rain by shouting Venus Power! Crescent Shower of Love! Shower Down Rain!.) She is also given numerous physical attacks, (Note: Namely Sailor V Kick!, Sailor V Chop!, Rolling Screw Sailor V Punch!, V-chan Rub Out Sailor V Chop!, Venus Iron Muscle Punch!, and V-chan Striking Katana!.) ones which are references to her guardian planet, (Note: Namely Venus Sulfur Smoke, which chokes her enemy with the atmosphere of Venus.) and comically named one-off powers. (Note: Namely Diphenhydramine Combo!, Venus-Brand Anti-Mosquito Incense Typhoon!!, Venus Ten Billion Volt Rock 'N' Rouge!!, and Venus Megaton Shower of Love!) The Compact must be placed in the moonlight to charge. It can also be used as a sharp throwing weapon, and in the manga series she retains it even as Sailor Venus. In the live-action version, she has an identical item which does not double as a compact, called the Crescent Moon Cutter. The pen she uses to transform into Sailor V has an extendable antenna used to contact "Boss," and no matter what is written with it, it will always be right. She later uses the same pen to transform into Sailor Venus. This form is not lost upon obtaining the Sailor Venus transformation, as shown in the side stories. She is also capable of unleashing poison gas, done in a hospital against a swarm of mosquitoes at a low concentration, composed of the atmosphere of Venus.

In the Sailor Moon anime, Sailor Venus' first primary attack is again Crescent Beam, this time without the use of an item. (Note: Called Venus Crescent Beam Smash in the DIC dub. There are two powered-up versions, Crescent Beam Shower, called Venus Meteor Shower in the DIC dub, and Crescent Beam Barrage.) She uses a similar power in the live-action series, without using an item or any special phrase, but nothing like it in the manga; instead, she uses Rolling Heart Vibration, which also makes a single appearance in the live-action series. Her first attack that is entirely consistent across the different adaptations is Venus Love-Me Chain, (Note: In the DIC and Cloverway dubs it is usually called Venus Love Chain Encircle, but has also been named Venus Love Chain Harness, Venus Love Chain Whip, Venus Love Chain, Super Venus Love Chain, or Venus Love Chain Knockout.) which in the manga and live-action series uses the chain wrapped around her waist. This remains her main attack for the rest of the second story arc, all of the third, and much of the fourth, and the chain itself is used in several variations, with the links taking on different shapes. The chain links are round in the manga and live-action series, but heart-shaped in the anime. Venus Wink Chain Sword (with heart-shaped links) appears in Manga Act 24, and Moony Moony Love-Me Moon Chain (Note: 必殺ラブミー・ムーン・チェーン, Hissatsu Rabu-Mi Mūn Chēn; Definite Kill Love-Me Moon Chain) is her attack when disguised as Sailor Moon in anime episode 102.

When she takes on her second Sailor Guardian form (Super Sailor Venus in the anime), she gains the ability to use Venus Love and Beauty Shock, which is her most powerful attack. (Note: In Act 50, the evil version of Sailor Venus controlled by Galaxia uses Venus Love and Galactica Shock, and the roses on her chain are replaced by galaxy-like shapes.) In the manga she also gains the Venus Crystal, which is her Sailor Crystal and the source of all of her power. In the live-action series, she is given a tambourine-like weapon (the Sailor Star Tambo) by Artemis. Also in the live-action series, once Minako discovers her true potential as a Guardian, she uses the attack Rolling Heart Vibration, a heart-shaped beam of rainbow energy, but only uses it once. She used the attack much earlier in the manga.

By holding hands with the other Sailor Guardians in a circle, she can use Sailor Teleport, Sailor Planet Attack, or Sailor Planet Power Meditation. When she is controlled by Galaxia in the manga and Crystal, she teams up with the other Inner Sailor Guardians to perform Galactica Gale. She, the Inner, and Outer Guardians then perform Galactica Planet Attack.

== Development ==
In the transition between the Sailor V and Sailor Moon series, Minako's basic character design did not change; in fact, creator Naoko Takeuchi has written that the concept of Minako has barely changed at all from the first moment she created. The magazine that serialized Sailor V, Run-Run, intended to produce an OVA based on the character but went bankrupt before it could happen, so Minako was relegated to the sidelines as one of Sailor Moon's costars, to Takeuchi's regret.

In Minako's new form as Sailor Venus, she would have a new uniform, and this went through many changes before settling to the one used in the publication. Early on, each of the Sailor Guardians had a fully unique costume, and Venus's was inspired largely by the Sailor V outfit. It was colored mostly in dark blue, with orange used only for the chest ribbon (which was not bow-shaped), and included a crescent moon motif, prominent armor, and white- and red stripes. Her red hair ribbon and trademark Sailor V mask were present as well. Later, Takeuchi was surprised by these sketches and stated that she did not remember drawing them.

The kanji in Minako's name translate as "love" (愛, ai), "field" or "civilian" (野, no), "beauty" (美, mi), "what" or "how" (奈, na), and "child" (子, ko). It is structured as a pun, as the syllable "no" indicates a possessive, so that her name can also be understood as "Beautiful Child of Love." This pun with the name being based on the aspect of the planet, in this case Venus being the goddess of love in Roman Mythology, runs across all the Sailor Soldiers. As Minako was "transplanted" from her previous series, unlike the other Soldiers, her family name does not begin with the same kanji as her planet, which would have been "gold" (金, kin). However, like them it is still a representation of her primary element, the "inevitable" connection with Venus, the Roman goddess of love. The characters of her given name can also, using unconventional but extant readings, be read as Binasu—a Japanese approximation of the name "Venus".

=== Actresses ===
In the original Japanese version of the Sailor Moon anime series, Minako is voiced by Rika Fukami, with Nanae Sumitomo as a stand-in for portions of episode 163 of SuperS. Shizuka Itō voiced her from Sailor Moon Crystal onwards.

In the original English-language dub of Sailor Moon, her name was changed to "Mina" (originally a nickname used in the Japanese version) and she was voiced by Stephanie Morgenstern for the first two seasons and all three movies. Emilie-Claire Barlow provided her voice in Cloverway's dub of episodes 90-166. In the Viz Media dub Minako is voiced by Cherami Leigh in Viz Media's dub of the entire Sailor Moon series (produced in association with Studiopolis). A Sailor Moon fan, Leigh read the female roles in California and was selected for Minako during her wedding in her homeland Texas.

In the stage musicals, Minako has been played by twenty one actresses: Nana Suzuki, Sakae Yamashita (Yume Senshi - Ai - Eien Ni soundtrack only and is not considered the 2nd actress to play her but the 2nd person to be cast since she was never in the musical performing as her), Chizuru Soya, Kanatsu Nakaya, Akiko Miyazawa, Miyu Otani, Nao Inada, Yuki Nakamura, Ayumi Murata, Mizuki Watanabe, Momoko Shibuya, half-American idol Erica, Shiori Sakata., Rimo Hasegawa, Hina Higuchi, Kana Nakada, Mayu Tamura, Sena, Yu Nakanishi, Saya Goto, Teresa Ikeda and Sakura Kawasaki.

In Pretty Guardian Sailor Moon, Minako is portrayed by Ayaka Komatsu.

== Reception and influence ==
The official Sailor Moon character popularity polls listed Minako Aino, Sailor V, and Sailor Venus as separate entities. In 1992, readers ranked Venus as the second most popular character, Minako being tenth and Sailor V being ninth, out of thirty-eight choices. One year later, now with fifty choices, Minako was the fifth most popular character, Sailor Venus was seventh, and Sailor V was tenth. In 1994, with fifty one choices, Sailor Venus was the twelfth most popular character, Minako was the fourteenth, and Sailor V was the nineteenth most popular character. In early 1996, with fifty-one choices, Sailor Venus was the seventeenth most popular character, Minako was again the fourteenth most popular, and Sailor V did not place.

Minako has had her powers the longest of the Sailor Guardians, and because of this, Jennifer Brown suggests that her sense of self-worth is more connected to her confidence in her powers.

Writing about Codename: Sailor V, Brigid Alverson describes Minako as more energetic than Usagi, stating that although she is not a good student, she is "a lively girl with a strong spirit, someone who does nothing by half measures," describing her as leaping through the panels of the manga. Katherine Dacey praises Minako's "can-do spirit," noting that she wholeheartedly embraces her responsibilities as Sailor V. Ed Sizemore feels that Minako's sporty nature makes her more confident than Usagi, feeling that she is much more self-sufficient. Sean Gaffney describes Minako as "hyperactive and proactive."

Her Sailor V form served as the basis for the Allenby's Nobel Gundam design in Mobile Fighter G Gundam.

== See also ==
- Venus in fiction
- Aphrodite
- Venus (mythology)
