= Codename: Sailor V =

Japanese manga by Naoko Takeuchi

- The Japanese cover of the first volume, depicting Sailor V and Artemis

コードネームはセーラーV (Kōdonēmu wa Sērā V)
- Manga
- Written by: Naoko Takeuchi
- Published by: Kodansha
- English publisher: NA: Kodansha USA
- Magazine: RunRun
- Original run: August 3, 1991 – July 3, 1997
- Volumes: 3
- Related Series
- Pretty Soldier Sailor Moon

Codename: Sailor V (Japanese: コードネームはセーラーV, Hepburn: Kōdonēmu wa Sērā Bui) is a Japanese manga series created by Naoko Takeuchi. It began as a one-shot in the magazine RunRun in August 1991, and returned as a serial that ran until July 1997. The series revolves around the character Minako Aino, a cheerful schoolgirl who discovers that she has magical powers that she must use to protect the people of the Earth.

Codename: Sailor V is best known as the basis for its sequel, Pretty Soldier Sailor Moon, which began serialization in December 1991. The series has received mixed reviews, with critics acknowledging its importance in the development of Sailor Moon, but criticizing its artwork and repetitive storytelling. Beginning in 2004, Kodansha has reissued the manga in several new editions with revised art and dialogue by Takeuchi. The series was translated into English and published in North America in 2011.

== Plot ==
Minako Aino is a 13-year-old middle school student who is slightly distracted, out-spoken and dreams about someday finding her true love and boyfriend. One day, she encounters a talking white cat with a crescent moon on its forehead named Artemis. He reveals that Minako possesses the magical ability to transform into a much stronger, more powerful, and more beautiful girl than anyone. Artemis calls Minako "Sailor Venus" and tells her she has a mission to protect Earth in the name of her guardian planet Venus. To help her with her new mission, Artemis gives her two items, a crescent moon shaped compact case and a magical pen. The magical pen allows her to transform into the Soldier of Justice: Sailor V.

Minako begins fighting the evil agents known as the Dark Agency, who fight under Danburite's command. He is in charge of sending his many talented idols to enslave the public. Minako has many adventures as a Soldier of Justice, some sparking the envy and admiration of the police force. She also later gains the aid of Saijyo Ace, who she develops romantic feelings towards.

Eventually, it is revealed that Saijyo Ace is the assumed guise of Danburite. In the ensuing battle, a heartbroken Minako mortally wounds Danburite, who before dying, curses Minako to never find love again. Afterwards, Minako realizes that her duty is more important than romance and discovers her true identity as Sailor Venus. From there, she decides to search for the other four Sailor Soldiers and the Moon Princess, leading to the events of Sailor Moon.

== Release ==
Codename: Sailor V made its debut as a one-shot in the summer vacation issue of the manga magazine RunRun, published on August 3, 1991. It returned as a serial in RunRun, which lasted until July 3, 1997. Kodansha compiled the fifteen chapters into three Tankōbon or "Bound Volumes" and published them from December 18, 1993, to November 6, 1997. In 2004, the series was re-released in Japan as a two-volume Shinsōban or "Deluxe Edition" with revised artwork and dialogue. This release also saw the final, fifteenth, chapter split into two giving this release sixteen chapters total. The two volumes were released on October 28, 2004, and November 20, 2004. On May 27, 2014 Codename: Sailor V was published in a two-volume Kanzenban or "Complete Edition". This has a premium release with A5 sized paper and has new covers based on the covers of the original release. On February 28, 2019, Codename: Sailor V was published in a two-volume Bunkoban or "Takeuchi Naoko Bunko Collection" edition of the manga which is a smaller version of the Kanzenban with similar covers.

An OVA series was teased in promotional materials, but never came to fruition as RunRun magazine, which had led the project, closed.

In North America, the original Japanese release was never officially localized into English. Kodansha USA licensed the "Deluxe Edition" of Codename: Sailor V for an English-language release, alongside its re-printing of the Sailor Moon manga. The two volumes released on September 13, 2011, and November 15, 2011. On March 18, 2020, Kodansha USA announced Codename: Sailor V Eternal Edition that features new cover art, a new translation, and color pages from the original serialization. It is an English-language release of the Japanese "Complete Edition." Both volumes were scheduled for release on January 5, 2021, but they were delayed with the first volume releasing September 28, 2021 and the second on November 9, 2021.

The series has also been translated into other languages, including Indonesian by Elex Media Komputindo, French and Spanish by Glenat; German by Egmont Manga & Anime; Italian by Star Edizioni and later by GP Publishing, serialized in its manga magazine Amici; and Polish by JPF.

== Chapters ==
=== Tankōbon editions ===
No.	Japanese release date	Japanese ISBN
1	December 18, 1993	4-06-322801-0
Vol. 1: "Sērā Bui Tanjō!" (セーラーV誕生！); Vol. 2: "Minako in 'Gēmu Sentā Kuraun'" (美奈子in「ゲームセンタークラウン」); Vol. 3: "Sērā Bui Hatsu Tōjo! -- 'Chaneru 44' Pandora no Yabō Hen" (セーラーV初登場－－「チャンネル44」パンドラの野望編); Vol. 4: "Puchi Pandora no Yabō Hen" (プチ・パンドラの野望編); Vol. 5: "Dāku Ējentsū no In Bō Hen" (ダーク・エージェンツーの院謀編); Vol. 6: "Taiketsu! Sērā Bui vs. Dennō Shōjo Tōshi Rūga" (対決！セーラーV vs. 電脳少女闘士ルゥガ)
Minako Aino has just gotten into middle school along with her friend Hikaru-chan. One day during practice, she accidentally lands on Artemis and gets mad after falling. Meanwhile, she wants to give her crush Higashi-senpai (Higashi-sama to the groupies) a love letter, but his groupies are too scary to go near. That night, Minako's mom scolds her for going over the fence and making her uniform filthy. After taking a shower and lamenting about her beauty, Artemis shows up, but is kicked out due to spying on her naked. Artemis then gives Minako a compact that reflects "only the truth". The next day, she decides to give her letter to Higashi-senpai, who is revealed to be a monster named Narcissus who is brainwashing the girls as slaves for the Dark Agency. Artemis and the boss then tell Minako to defeat him, she then becomes Sailor V for the first time and defeats Narcissus, but is sad because he was her first crush, Artemis then calms her that night and places the compact under the moonlight to recharge it. They then go to the arcade where they run into Takuro "Taku" Otaku, Minako then complains about her uniform as Sailor V and tells Artemis that she needs more protective armor, all while calling Artemis a homophobic slur due to his name being a reference to the goddess by the same name. She then becomes Sailor V once she realizes that the armor is too heavy. A new idol named Pandora then appears and has a concert being shown on Channel 44, but Sailor V must stop her from brainwashing all of Japan. Her younger sister Petite Pandora then appears and challenges Sailor V to a duel. Fluorite, has made three clones of herself in order to take over Japan, those being triplet brothers Dark Guys, twin sisters Twin Dark and the older Dark Shizuka-Hime, Sailor V steps in to stop them, but Artemis tells her that she isn't the main enemy. A new VR fighting game with a character named "Cyber Galaxtrix Ruga" is released, but is making people violent, Ruga is revealed to be an enemy and loses to Sailor V, V then destroys the console containing the said game in.
2	October 22, 1994	4-06-322810-X
Vol. 7: "Sērā Bui Bakansu Hen -- Hawai e no Yabō!" (セーラーVバカンス編－－ハワイヘの野望！); Vol. 8: "Namiki Michi no Koi -- Tābo Zenkai BariBari! Hen" (並木道の恋－－ターボ全開バリバリ！編); Vol. 9: "Sērā Bui vs. Deburīne" (セーラーV vs. デブリーネ); Vol. 10: "Sērā Bui Pinchi!? Kaitō A Tōjō" (セーラーVピンチ！？怪盗A登場！)
Minako can't wait to go to Hawaii and as Sailor V after beating up criminals wins it, but as they get on the plane, they instead go to Greece, where Hibiscusy, a agent from the Dark Agency's Hawaiian branch appears and uses a sad and disappointed photographer to attack her, dubbing himself as "Aloha Mask", Hibiscusy then shows up to fight Sailor V and then is defeated, Minako decides to give Hikaru-chan a gift from Greece; a carpet. Minako writes in her diary about a man she fell in love with named Saito-kun, but he is a gang member and his fellow thugs want him to graduate with a clean record, the enemy of the day, Vivian, shows up to fight Sailor V. It's almost Valentine's day and Minako doesn't know who to give chocolate to. Deburine then sells her rainbow candies shaped like roses in order to fatten up the girls who eat them, runs a salon that actually sucks away their energy and fights Sailor V, but a mysterious man shows up. The man is revealed to be the "Phantom Theif Ace" or Ace Saijo, Fonda then shows up to make the perfect "Heroine" to defeat Sailor V.
3	November 6, 1997	4-06-322834-7
Vol. 11: "Petto Hen Sono 1 Nyan Nyan no Inbō" (ペット編その1．娘々の陰謀); Vol. 12: "Petto Hen Sono 2 Wan Wan no Inbō" (ペット編その2．王々の陰謀); Vol. 13: "Petto Hen Sono 3 Chū Chū no Inbō" (ペット編その3．触々の陰謀); Vol. 14: "Hachimaki Ishi ni Kaketa Seishun!!" (ハチマキ石にかけた青春！！); Vol. 15: "Arata Naru Tabidachi!!" (新たなる旅立ちッ！！)
Minako is competing in a scavenger race, but has to defeat the feline princess Nyan-Nyan. Wan-Wan, Nyan-Nyan's brother, disguises himself as a dog in order to take revenge on Sailor V. The third sibling, Chu-Chu plans to suck blood out of all of Japan in order to get more energy. Minako starts to crush on her half-Russian classmate Otonaru Maiku, but he has a weak heart that must be cured, Mic Makie then appears to defeat V, but Sailor V uses a new move to defeat her. Minako and Artemis then go to China to star in Ace's latest film, but his manager, Princess Lin-Lin, wants to get more energy and roast Artemis (in the context of cooking rather than the slang word for making fun of someone). Minako then learns that she is indeed Sailor Venus and that Ace is Danburite, the real one in charge of the Dark Agency, she defeats him out of heartbreak and moves on, looking for her allies

=== Shinsōban editions ===
No.	Original release date	Original ISBN	English release date	English ISBN
1	October 29, 2004	4-06-334929-2	September 13, 2011	978-1935429777
Vol. 1: "Sailor V is Born!" (セーラーV誕生！, "Sērā Bui Tanjō!"); Vol. 2: "Minako in 'Crown Game Center'" (美奈子in「ゲームセンタークラウン」, "Minako in 'Gēmu Sentā Kuraun'"); Vol. 3: "Sailor V Appears! Channel 44 / Pandora's Plot" (セーラーV初登場－－「チャンネル44」パンドラの野望編, "Sērā Bui Hatsu Toujō! -- 'Chaneru 44' Pandora no Yabō Hen"); Vol. 4: "Petite Pandora's Plot" (プチ・パンドラの野望編, "Puchi Pandora no Yabō Hen"); Vol. 5: "The Dark Agency's Plot" (ダーク・エージェンツーの院謀編, "Dāku Eejentsū no In Bō Hen"); Vol. 6: "Showdown! Sailor V vs. Electronic Fighter Girl Luga" (対決！セーラーV vs. 電脳少女闘士ルゥガ, "Taiketsu! Sērā Bui vs. Dennō Shōjo Toshi Rūga"); Vol. 7: "Sailor V's Vacation / The Hawaiian Plot!" (セーラーVバカンス編－－ハワイヘの野望！, "Sērā Bui Bakansu Hen -- Hawai e no Yabō!"); Vol. 8: "Love on the Tree-Lined Road / Tearing at Turbo Full-Throttle!" (並木道の恋－－ターボ全開バリバリ！編, "Namiki Michi no Koi -- Tābo Zenkai BariBari! Hen")
2	November 22, 2004	4-06-334947-0	November 15, 2011	978-1935429784
Vol. 9: "Sailor V vs. Debrine" (セーラーV vs. デブリーネ, "Sērā Bui vs. Deburīne"); Vol. 10: "Sailor V in a Pinch!? Phantom Ace Appears!" (セーラーVピンチ！？怪盗A登場！, "Sērā Bui Pinchi!? Kaitō A Tōjō"); Vol. 11: "The Pet Stories / Number 1: Nyan-Nyan's Plot" (ペット編その1．娘々の陰謀, "Petto Hen Sono 1 Nyan Nyan no Inbō"); Vol. 12: "The Pet Stories / Number 2: Wan-Wan's Plot" (ペット編その2．王々の陰謀, "Petto Hen Sono 2 Wan Wan no Inbō"); Vol. 13: "The Pet Stories / Number 3: Chuu-Chuu's Plot" (ペット編その3．触々の陰謀, "Petto Hen Sono 3 Chuu Chuu no Inbō"); Vol. 14: "Youth Bet on the Hachimaki Stone!!" (ハチマキ石にかけた青春！！, "Hachimaki Ishi ni Kaketa Seishun!!"); Vol. 15: "A New Journey Begins!! First Part" (新たなる旅立ちッ！！前編, "Arata Naru Tabidachi!! Zenpen"); Vol. 16: "A New Journey Begins!! Last Part" (新たなる旅立ちッ！！後編, "Arata Naru Tabidachi!! Kōhen")

=== Kanzenban editions ===
No.	Original release date	Original ISBN	English release date	English ISBN
1	May 29, 2014	978-4-06-364946-8	September 28, 2021	978-1646511433
Vol. 1: "Sailor V is Born!" (セーラーV誕生！, "Sērā Bui Tanjō!"); Vol. 2: "Minako in 'Crown Game Center'" (美奈子in「ゲームセンタークラウン」, "Minako in 'Gēmu Sentā Kuraun'"); Vol. 3: "Sailor V's Big Debut! Channel 44: Pandora's Ambition" (セーラーV初登場－－「チャンネル44」パンドラの野望編, "Sērā Bui Hatsu Toujō! -- 'Chaneru 44' Pandora no Yabō Hen"); Vol. 4: "Petite Pandora's Ambition" (プチ・パンドラの野望編, "Puchi Pandora no Yabō Hen"); Vol. 5: "The Dark Agency Conspiracy" (ダーク・エージェンツーの院謀編, "Dāku Eejentsū no In Bō Hen"); Vol. 6: "Showdown! Sailor V vs. Cyber Galadiatrix Ruga" (対決！セーラーV vs. 電脳少女闘士ルゥガ, "Taiketsu! Sērā Bui vs. Dennō Shōjo Toshi Rūga"); Vol. 7: "Sailor V on Vacation: Ambitions Toward Hawaii!" (セーラーVバカンス編－－ハワイヘの野望！, "Sērā Bui Bakansu Hen -- Hawai e no Yabō!"); Vol. 8: "Love on a Tree-Lined Road: Super Turbo Full Throttle!" (並木道の恋－－ターボ全開バリバリ！編, "Namiki Michi no Koi -- Tābo Zenkai BariBari! Hen")
2	May 29, 2014	978-4-06-364947-5	November 9, 2021	978-1646511440
Vol. 9: "Sailor V vs. Deburine" (セーラーV vs. デブリーネ, "Sērā Bui vs. Deburīne"); Vol. 10: "Sailor V's in Trouble?! Enter the Phantom Thief Ace!" (セーラーVピンチ！？怪盗A登場！, "Sērā Bui Pinchi!? Kaitō A Tōjō"); Vol. 11: "Pet Perils Part 1: Nyan-Nyan's Ambition" (ペット編その1．娘々の陰謀, "Petto Hen Sono 1 Nyan Nyan no Inbō"); Vol. 12: "Pet Perils Part 2: Wan-Wan's Ambition" (ペット編その2．王々の陰謀, "Petto Hen Sono 2 Wan Wan no Inbō"); Vol. 13: "Pet Perils Part 3: Chu-Chu's Ambition" (ペット編その3．触々の陰謀, "Petto Hen Sono 3 Chuu Chuu no Inbō"); Vol. 14: "Staking the Springtime of Youth on a Hachimaki Stone!!" (ハチマキ石にかけた青春！！, "Hachimaki Ishi ni Kaketa Seishun!!"); Vol. 15: "A New Journey Begins!! Part One" (新たなる旅立ちッ！！前編, "Arata Naru Tabidachi!! Zenpen"); Vol. 16: "A New Journey Begins!! Part Two" (新たなる旅立ちッ！！後編, "Arata Naru Tabidachi!! Kōhen")

=== Bunkoban editions ===
No.	Original release date	Original ISBN	English release date	English ISBN
1	March 1, 2019	978-4-06-514085-7	2025	—
2	March 1, 2019	978-4-06-514086-4	2025	979-8-88877-107-5

== Reception ==
Codename: Sailor V received generally mixed reviews. Brigid Alverson of MTV Geek described the series as feeling like a rough draft of Sailor Moon. Ed Sizemore from Comics Worth Reading felt Sailor V had less character development than Sailor Moon, but that this was not a drawback. Sean Gaffney of Manga Bookshelf noted that unlike Usagi, Minako performs her missions alone, and describes the tone of the manga as an "action comedy". Writing for Anime News Network, Rebecca Silverman noted that most of Sailor V is episodic, but feels it is worth reading due to the insights it gives into Minako's character, and the groundwork it lays for Sailor Moon. Katherine Dacey wrote for Manga Critic that while an adult may see the series as "repetitive, hokey, and poorly drawn", a child would see it as an "appealing fantasy in which an ordinary girl can assume a new, powerful identity" to defeat bullies and evil. Dacey saw Minako's enthusiastic personality as Codename: Sailor V's greatest strength. The Fandom Post's Matthew Warner saw the book as being a "lighthearted spoof" of magical girl titles.

=== Sales ===
For the week of 11 September 2011 to 17 September 2011, Codename: Sailor V was second on The New York Times Manga Best Sellers list, behind the first volume of Sailor Moon. For the week of 6–12 November 2011, the first volume appeared at #2 on the list, above Sailor Moon for the first time. The following week, the second volume of Codename: Sailor V appeared at #2 on the list, and the first volume did not appear. On the BookScan Top 20 Graphic Novels of November 2011, the second volume placed third, and the first volume placed thirteenth.
