= Anza (singer) =

Japanese singer and actress (born 1976)

Anza アンザ
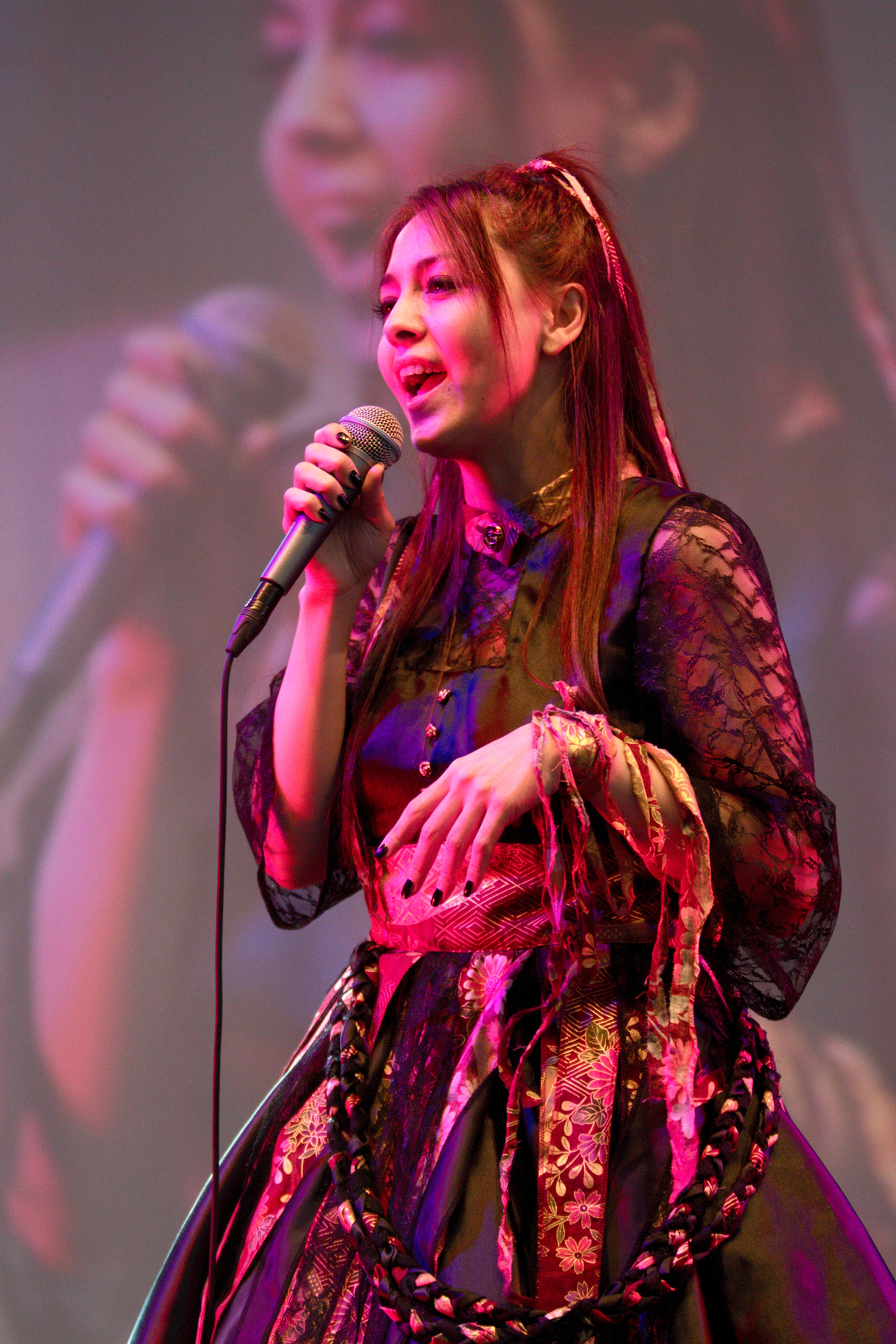
- Anza performing in 2011

Background information
- Born: May 4, 1976 (age 50); Cape Town, South Africa
- Genres: Rock; pop; heavy metal
- Occupations: Singer, actress
- Years active: 1992–present
- Labels: Sony, Victor, Universal
- Member of: Head Phones President
- Formerly of: Sakurakko Club
- Website: www.anza.jp

Anza Ohyama (Japanese: 大山 アンザ, Hepburn: Ōyama Anza; born May 4, 1976), also known as simply Anza (stylized in all caps), is a Japanese singer and theater actress best known as vocalist of the heavy metal band Head Phones President and for playing Sailor Moon in thirteen separate musical productions.

== Early life ==
Anza was born in Cape Town, South Africa, to a White South African mother and a Japanese father. When they moved to Nagasaki, Japan in her childhood, Anza was not fluent in the Japanese language and was bullied because of her foreign appearance. She has a younger sister named Chiho who played Sailor Jupiter in Sailor Moon musicals.

== Career ==
Anza began modeling in junior high school and was invited to shoot a commercial in Nagoya. At fifteen, she made her acting debut on NHK's Chūgakusei Nikki. She made her music debut in 1992 as a member of the pop idol group Sakurakko Club and released a number of singles with them. She and Ayako Morino, also of Sakurakko Club fame, were in a spin-off duo called Momo.

With Anza joining the Sailor Moon musicals in 1993, she appeared regularly on the CD releases for the musicals, both in solo and group songs. From her five-year period as Sailor Moon, she can be heard on the "La Soldier" single (released prior to the very first musical), the first five Memorial Album of the Musical releases, as well as three of the eight compilation albums which have been released since the musicals' conception. In 1994, Moon Lips, a group of actresses from the musicals including Anza, provided vocals for the Sailor Moon anime's theme song "Moonlight Densetsu".

Shortly following her graduation from the Sailor Moon musicals in 1998, she released a solo single entitled "Dream" under the Sony Music Entertainment Japan record label. "Dream" was also featured as the ending theme song for the TV show Famitsu Wave. In April 1999, she released "Tobira wo Akete" (under Victor Entertainment), a single which was used as a theme song for the anime Cardcaptor Sakura. In September 1999, Anza provided vocals for "Ai wo Shizumeteru", the ending theme song to the PlayStation game Psychic Force 2. Another of her songs, "Mienai Chizu", was used as an insert song in episode 68 of Cardcaptor Sakura.

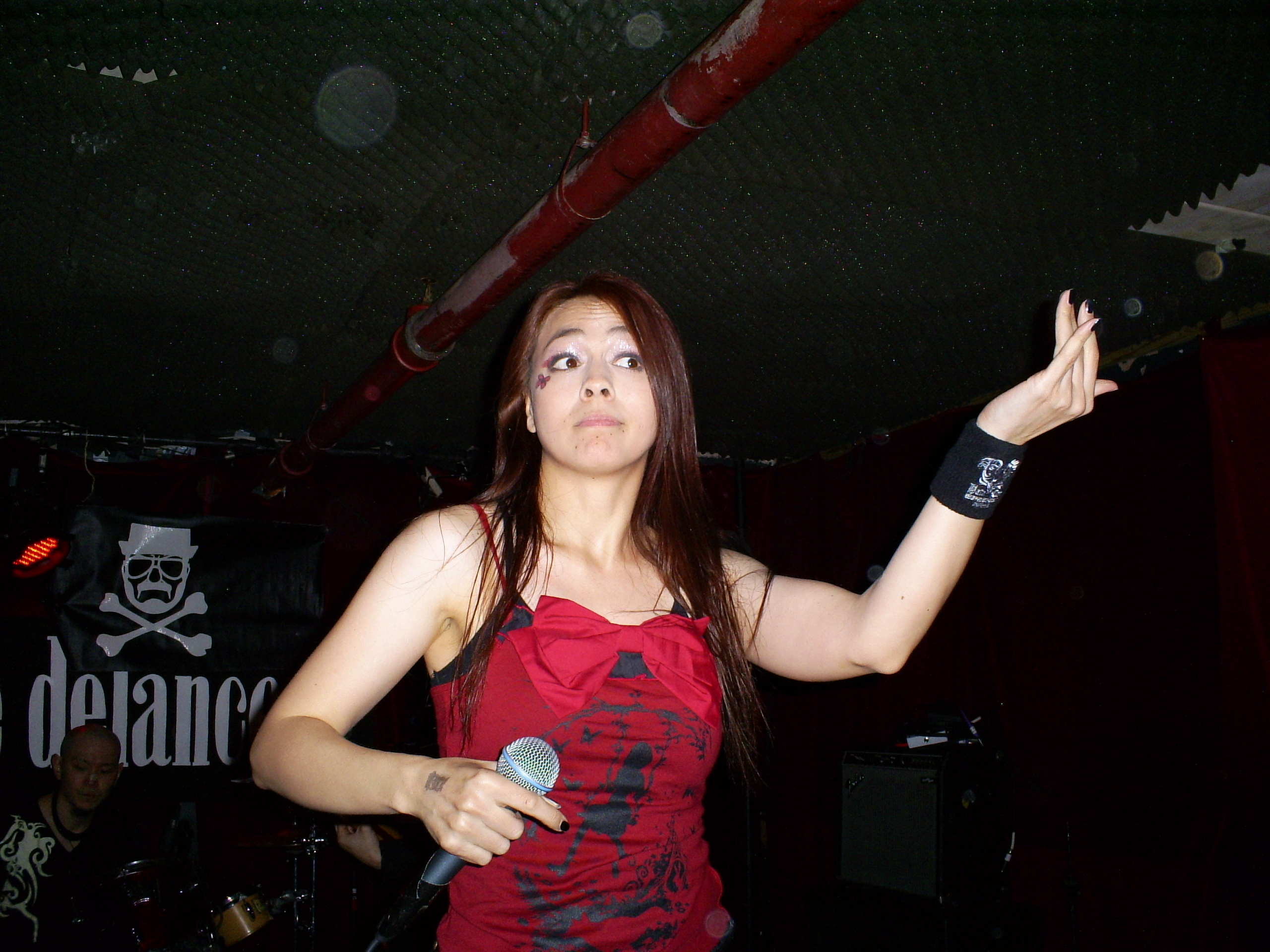
Anza with Head Phones President in New York City, 2010

In 1999, Anza went in a completely different direction with her music. She formed Head Phones President with brothers Hiro and Mar, who previously helped her on her solo work. They are a heavy metal band, with occasional screamed vocals interspersed with soft melodic singing. Anza is often introduced as being on "vocals and visuals". They have referred to their music as "'negative', due to their emotional lyrics that stem from traumatic experiences, [but] believe their music expresses their struggles in a hopeful manner." A lot of the lyrics come from Anza; the song "Alienblood" represents her own troubles growing up in Japan as mixed race.

In 2003, Toho recorded four of its Les Misérables musicals live, and they released four double-disc albums (available only by special order directly from Toho). Anza appears on the light blue album with Kazutaka Ishii as Jean Valjean.

In 2006, Anza was signed onto the Universal Music Japan and released her debut single with them: "Kanata e". It was used as the second ending theme song for the anime Glass no Kantai.

In late 2008, she joined the rock band Vitamin-Q along with Masami Tsuchiya, Kazuhiko Katō, Gota Yashiki and Rei Ohara. However, after Katō's suicide on October 17, 2009, the group ceased activity. In 2009, she also appeared in Vamps' music video for their cover of Shampoo's "Trouble".

In 2011, Anza started a webshop in collaboration with Riho, "Raz -Rabbit" is a shop of clothes and accessories. On May 1, 2011, Anza performed a solo show in support of 2011 Tōhoku earthquake and tsunami victims. At the show, named Anza's Box, she sang songs from the Sailor Moon, Gift and Les Misérables musicals, as well as her solo career. Misako Iwana (from Sailor Moon), Manabu Oda (from Gift) and members of Head Phones President also participated. On December 24, Anza performed the solo show Anza Xmas Live at the Live & Cafe Bar Rocky in Tokyo.

In late 2012, Anza was featured on the song "Unmei no Megami" from the group Dragon Guardian, at the album The Best of Dragon Guardian Saga. Since 2013, Anza has performed as a DJ sporadically, alone or with her bandmate Narumi. On May 24, 2014, Anza celebrated her 22 years of career in the show Anza Solo Live with participation of musicians Kato Tomoko, Hiro and Masaru Sakaguchi, in addition to special guests Okuyama Momoko, Iwana Misako (formerly Kotani Misako), Oda Manabu, Haruka (Rouse Garden) and Fujiwara Yuki.

The music of Head Phones President was the genesis of the rock musical Stand in the World written and directed by Shohei Hayashi, which ran at the Tokyo Arts Center from June 11–13, 2016. The band performed during the show which stars Erika Yamakawa, Manabu Oda and Hikari Ono. For the 15th anniversary of the PGS Special, RAZ had a physical store in Ikebukuro from November 10 to 28. On December 2, 2016, Anza performed the show Anza Solo Live" at New Eight in Kamata, Tokyo. The show featured Misako Iwana, in addition to the musicians Tomo on keyboards and Hiro on guitar. On May 4, 2017, Anza performed the show Anza Birthday Live in the same location, with the same guests, with the additional participation of Manabu Oda. On February 26, 2017, Anza made a guest appearance on JENOFES at Ikebukuro Live Inn Rosa in Tokyo. On March 25, she started the column "Good times for a change ☆" on the Beeast online music magazine.

Anza World, a special live celebrating the 20th anniversary of Anza's colo career and the seventh anniversary of RAZ, was held on July 13, 2018, at Sengawa Fix Hall with guests Misako Iwana and Nana (Reasterisk); musicians Tomo and Hiro; apparel RAZ; DJ Narumi and models Chiro, Area, iPo, Erina Nagano, Misato Koromo, Tetsutaro Otaki and Rika Ayami.

=== Stage career ===
Anza has performed in a number of stage productions, the majority of which being musicals. Her first major production was as the leading role of Sailor Moon in the Sailor Moon musicals, commonly referred to as "Sera Myu". She is one of the longest-running cast members to ever perform in the musicals and is the longest-running to play the Sailor Moon character to date. She held the role for five years performing in thirteen separate productions between 1993 and 1998.

Nearing the end of her stretch as Sailor Moon, Anza also performed in a musical called 2050-nen no Aoi Shima between 1997 and 1998. Chiruchiru was the name of her character. In 2000, she broke off from the musical scene in a Japanese stage production of Mr. Holland's Opus. Similarly, in 2002, she was in a Japanese stage production of When Harry Met Sally....

In 2003, Anza returned to doing musicals by taking on the role of Éponine in several Toho productions of Les Misérables until 2006. In 2004, Anza appeared as Ellen in one production of Miss Saigon (also produced by Toho) as well as a Japanese adaptation of Anton Chekhov's Three Sisters in the role of Irina.

Preceded by N/A	Usagi Tsukino / Sailor Moon in the Sailor Moon musicals 1993–1998	Succeeded by Fumina Hara

== Discography ==
Solo

- "Kokoro no Lion" (心のライオン; "Lion's Heart", June 18, 1993)
- "Dream" (April 18, 1998)
- "Tobira o Akete" (扉をあけて; "Open the Door", April 21, 1999) – 2nd opening theme song to the Cardcaptor Sakura anime
- "Kanata e" (彼方へ; "To the Other Side", August 2, 2006) – ending theme song to the Glass no Kantai anime
- "'Rashiku' Ikimasho" ("らしく"いきましょ; "Let's go 'Likely'", January 13, 2021) – ending theme song to the Pretty Guardian Sailor Moon Eternal: The Movie Part 2 anime
- Voice of My Heart (June 20, 2021)

With Sakurakko Club Sakura-gumi

- Nani ga Nandemo (なにがなんでも; "What is Everything", November 25, 1992)
- Doshite (どうして; "Why", July 1, 1993)
- La Soldier (ラ・ソウルジャー; "The Soldier", August 1, 1993)
- Mou Ichido Waratte yo (もう一度笑ってよ; "Please Smile Once More", August 24, 1994)
- Moonlight Densetsu (ムーンライト伝説; "Moonlight Legend", July 21, 1995)

With Momo

- Just Combination (1993)
- Summer Candle -Momo in New Caledonia (VHS, 1993)
  - Pocket Bell Night wa 5643# (1994)

With Sailor Moon musicals

- Memorial Album of the Musical "Pretty Soldier Sailor Moon": An Alternate Legend: The Dark Kingdom Revival Story
- Memorial Album of the Musical 2 "Pretty Soldier Sailor Moon S": Usagi – The Path to Become the Soldier of Love
- Memorial Album of the Musical 3 "Pretty Soldier Sailor Moon SuperS": Dream Warriors – Love – Into Eternity...
- Memorial Album of the Musical 4 "Pretty Soldier Sailor Moon Sailor Stars"
- Memorial Album of the Musical 5 "Pretty Soldier Sailor Moon" Eternal Legend
- Memorial Album of the Musical "Pretty Soldier Sailor Moon": ~ Best Sound Track ~
- Memorial Album of the Musical "Pretty Soldier Sailor Moon": Theme Songs 1993~1999
- Memorial Album of the Musical "Pretty Soldier Sailor Moon": Best Songs Collection —Best Songs Chosen by Fans—
- Memorial Album of the Musical "Pretty Soldier Sailor Moon": Love Ballad Edition
- Memorial Album of the Musical "Pretty Soldier Sailor Moon": Dark Side Edition: Best Songs

With Head Phones President

See Head Phones President discography

With Vitamin-Q

- Vitamin-Q Featuring Anza (December 12, 2008)

Other

- "Mienai Chizu" - song insert at episode 68 of Cardcaptor Sakura
- "Ai wo Shizumeteru" - the ending theme song of the PlayStation game Psychic Force 2, 1999
- "Unmei no megami" (運命の女神; "Goddess of Destiny", December 12, 2012) - Dragon Guardian, at album The Best of Dragon Guardian Saga

== Musicals ==
Anza performed as Usagi Tsukino/Sailor Moon in the following musicals:

- 1993 - Summer Special Musical Bishoujo Senshi Sailor Moon - Gaiden Dark Kingdom Fukkatsu Hen
- 1994 - Winter Special Musical Bishoujo Senshi Sailor Moon - Gaiden Dark Kingdom Fukkatsu Hen-(Kaiteiban)
- 1994 - Bishoujo Senshi Sailor Moon - Super Spring Festival
- 1994 - Summer Special Musical Bishoujo Senshi Sailor Moon S - Usagi: Ai no Senshi e no Michi
- 1995 - Winter Special Musical Bishoujo Senshi Sailor Moon S - Henshin – Super Senshi e no Michi-
- 1995 - Spring Spring Special Musical Bishoujo Senshi Sailor Moon S - Henshin - Super Senshi e no Michi (Kaiteiban)
- 1995 - Summer Special Musical Bishoujo Senshi Sailor Moon SuperS - Yume Senshi - Ai - Eien ni...
- 1996 - Spring Special Musical Bishoujo Senshi Sailor Moon SuperS - (Kaiteiban) Yume Senshi - Ai - Eien ni... Saturn Fukkatsu Hen
- 1996 - Bishoujo Senshi Sailor Moon SuperS - Special Musical Show
- 1996 - Summer Special Musical Bishoujo Senshi Sailor Moon - Sailor Stars
- 1997 - Winter Special Musical Bishoujo Senshi Sailor Moon - Sailor Stars (Kaiteiban)
- 1997 - Summer Special Musical Bishoujo Senshi - Eien Densetsu
- 1998 - Winter Special Musical Bishoujo Senshi - Eien Densetsu (Kaiteiban) - The Final First Stage

As herself/guest

- 1998 - Golden Week Fan Kansha Event
- 1999 - Boys Be ... Alive
- 2000 - 500kai Kouen Kinen - 500th Performance Special~
- 2002 Spring 10th Anniversary Festival
- Dai 2 Bu - Memorial Talk & Live Show
- 777kai Kouen Kinen - 777th Performance of Sera Myu

Other musicals

- 1997–1998 - Chiruchiru in 2050 no Aoi Tori
- 2000 - Rowena Morgan in Mr. Holland's Opus
- 2002 - Emily Diner in When Harry Met Sally...
- 2003–2006 - Éponine in Les Misérables
- 2004 - Ellen in Miss Saigon
- 2004 - Irina Sergeyevna Prozorova in Three Sisters
- 2006, 2009, 2013 - Ayaka in Gift
- 2007 - Sint-Margherita in Ai, Toki wo Koete Sekigahara Ibun
- 2008 - Julia in Rag and Jewelry
- 2008 - Homma Ayako in Only You Really Musical
- 2008 - Tsukino Yayoi in Ninshin Sasete
- 2008 - Julia (Sawamoto Yuriko) in Boro to Houseki
- 2008 - Honma Ayako in Kiss Yori mo Setsunaku
- 2009 - Madeleine in The Umbrellas of Cherbourg
- 2009 - Amneris in Aida
- 2016 - Hikaru in Stand in the World - The Rock Musical Show

== Filmography ==
- 1992 - Susume! Chikyū Bōei Shōjo-tai ("Earth Defense Corps Girl! Promoted") - herself
- 1992 - Chuugakusei Nikki ("Junior High School Diar"y) - herself
- 1998 - Shin Megami Tensei: Devil Summoner - Kamiya Tōichirō
- 2009 - "Trouble" - music video for Vamps

== Photobooks ==
- Anza Complete (1997)
