= Kurumizawa =

Kurumizawa (Japanese: 胡桃沢) is a Japanese surname. Notable people and fictional characters with this surname include:

== Real people ==
- Hiroko Kurumizawa (born 1974), a Japanese singer
- Koshi Kurumizawa (1925 – 1994), a Japanese detective fiction writer
- Mahiru Kurumizawa, who helped produce the music video for the 2022 song Mr. (Yoasobi song)
- Yuki Kurumizawa, who Japanese kickboxer Rasta Kido once faced in a 2012 match

== Fictional characters ==
- Makoto Kurumizawa, a fictional schoolboy in the manga Boys Be...
- Satanichia McDowell Kurumizawa, a fictional demon in the manga and anime Gabriel DropOut
- Ume Kurumizawa, a fictional schoolgirl in the manga Kimi ni Todoke
- Kurumizawa, a minor character in the Japanese tragicomedy Christmas film Tokyo Godfathers (2003)
- Momo Kurumizawa, a fictional student in the light novel series Hybrid × Heart Magias Academy Ataraxia
