= Shigeharu Shiba =

Japanese anime director (born 1932)

Shigeharu Shiba (斯波 重治, Shiba Shigeharu; born October 1 1932 in Tokyo, Japan) is an anime audio director and producer. He graduated from Mie Prefecture and went on to form the Jiyū Theatre Troupe. Shiba then joined Omnibus Promotion, where he worked on anime television series, OVAs, and movies.

To the sound director Shigeru Chiba

Lecturer introduction Advance Promotion Representative Akiko Takamura

== Anime ==
All credits are for audio director unless otherwise indicated.

=== TV ===
- Anime Himitsu no Kaen
- Baldios
- Eat-Man '98
- Future Boy Conan
- High School! Kimen-gumi
- Maison Ikkoku
- Maitchingu Machiko-sensei
- Ranma ½
- Sei Jūshi Bismarck
- Sherlock Hound (recording director)
- Tanoshii Moomin Ikka
- Tanoshii Moomin Ikka: Bōken Nikki
- Urusei Yatsura
- Gwen's Pants

=== OVAs ===
- Area 88
- Bari Bari Densetsu (audio producer)
- Cosmo Police Justy

=== Film ===
- Angel's Egg
- Anime Sanjushi: Aramis no Bōken
- Castle in the Sky
- Catnapped! (music director)
- Digital Devil Story: Megami Tensei (recording director)
- Dokaben (recording director)
- Junkers Come Here
- Kenji no Trunk: Futago no Suisei
- My Neighbor Totoro (audio producer)
- Nausicaä of the Valley of the Wind
- Only Yesterday (planning)
- Patlabor the Movie
- The Red Spectacles (producer)
- Shirahata no Shōjo Ryūko
- Shizuka na Gogo ni: Suika o Katta, Sawano Hitoshi (short film, audio producer)
- Tanoshii Moomin Ikka: Muumindani no Suisei
- Teito Monogatari (audio advisor)
- They Were 11 (recording director)
- Tobira o Akete (recording director)
- Urusei Yatsura: Only You
- Urusei Yatsura 2: Beautiful Dreamer
- Urusei Yatsura 3: Remember My Love
- Urusei Yatsura 4: Lum the Forever (recording director)
- Xeno/Kagirinaki Ai ni
