= Pen Pen TriIcelon =

1998 video game

Pen Pen Trilcelon
- European boxart
- Developers: Land Ho! General Entertainment
- Publishers: JP: General Entertainment; NA: Infogrames North America; EU: Infogrames Multimedia
- Director: Kyoichi Mori
- Producer: Hironori Miyagawa
- Composers: DogStarMan (Hiroyuki Nagashima, Hisahiko Horiuchi, Yuki Osaka)
- Platform: Dreamcast
- Release: JP: November 27, 1998; NA: September 9, 1999; EU: October 14, 1999
- Genre: Racing
- Modes: Single player, multiplayer

Pen Pen TriIcelon (ペンペントライアイスロン, Pen Pen ToraiAisuron), known simply as Pen Pen in Europe, is a video game created by one of the first Japanese companies to reveal Dreamcast development, General Entertainment, otherwise known as Land Ho! It was released in Japan as one of four launch titles, as well as all other regions.

== Development ==
Pen Pen Trilceon was developed by Land Ho!, a former internal team at General Entertainment that later became its own company. The studio was still newly founded by the time development began. General Entertainment had been developing two titles, Pen Pen and Godzilla Generations, for the Dreamcast's launch. As a result, Pen Pen had a rushed development which likely explains its short length and lack of promised unlockables.

The soundtrack was composed by Hiroyuki Nagashima, Hisahiko Horiuchi and Yuki Osaka under the band name "DogStarMan". The soundtrack was released on CD as Pen Pen Trilceon Sound Tracks by the label Marvelous Entertainment Inc. in December 1998.

== Gameplay ==
A TriIcelon is similar to the real-world triathlon. TriIcelons consist of three separate sporting styles in one game: running, sliding, and swimming. These three things combine to make a race where everyone competes for first place. The TriIcelons take place in four courses: Sweets, Jungle, Toys, and Horror.

The player controls little penguin-like characters called Pen Pen, in a race consisting of the three separate sporting styles. Both the sliding and swimming parts are raced by tapping and holding the action button in a rhythmic motion to maintain a smooth flowing pace. The running section is controlled simply with the analogue stick, also with the ability to jump, and charge into other competitors. The playable characters include the Pen Pens Sparky and Tina, the Pen Hippo Ballery, the Pen Shark Jaw, the Pen Walrus Back, the Pen Octopus Sneak, the Pen Dog Mr. Bow, and the unknown-species Hanamizu.

== Story ==
The Pen Pen are said to live on a small world called Iced Planet, and was here that the strange alien race were first discovered. Since the closest animal on Earth they resemble is the penguin, they were first given the name Pen Pen. The Pen Pen pretty much inhabit most of the planet's surface. It is believed they do, in fact, have their own language, but if so, it is totally incomprehensible to humans.

It was later discovered that they come in a variety of different shapes and sizes. Other types came from other planets to visit the Iced Planet. Six types have been discovered so far.

In an environment of snow, ice, and water, the Pen Pen run, slide, and swim on an ice field.

These creatures saw the Pen Pen and came up with an idea, and thus, the TriIcelon was born.

This soon became the most popular sport on the Iced Planet. Pen Pens enjoy this sport every day and never get bored of competing, but once a year, they hold a grand TriIcelon race to determine the number one TriIcelon player. The PenPen characters later made a cameo appearance on several posters in Blue Stinger's Christmas mall area.

== Reception ==
Reception

Aggregate score
Aggregator	Score
GameRankings	64%

Review scores
Publication	Score
AllGame	2.5/5
Edge	5/10
Electronic Gaming Monthly	5.5/10
Famitsu	25/40
Game Informer	4/10
GameFan	(J.W.) 80% 60%
GamePro	3.5/5
GameRevolution	C+
GameSpot	6/10
GameSpy	3.5/10
IGN	6.6/10
Next Generation	2/5

The game received mixed reviews according to video game review aggregator site GameRankings. Adam Pavlacka of NextGen said of the game, "If you regularly play games with a group, pick it up – otherwise make it a rental." In Japan, Famitsu gave it a score of 25 out of 40.
