= Murder on the Eurasia Express =

1998 video game

Eurasia Express Satsujin Jiken
- Developer: System Sacom
- Publisher: Enix
- Platform: PlayStation
- Release: JP: 26 November 1998
- Genres: Interactive movie, adventure
- Mode: Single-player

Murder on the Eurasia Express (Note: In Japanese: Yūrashia Ekusupuresu Satsujin Jiken (ユーラシアエクスプレス殺人事件)) is an interactive movie and adventure video game developed by System Sacom and published by Enix for the PlayStation in 1998. It was released exclusively in Japan and is the first game in the "Cinema Active" series, followed later by Love Story (2000) on the PlayStation 2. The game is presented entirely in live-action full motion video and stars several Japanese idols.

== Synopsis ==
A conversation with one of the school girls.

Murder on the Eurasia Express is an interactive movie and adventure game presented entirely with live-action full motion video. The player takes on the role of a private detective invited by an all-girls private school to join their trip on the Eurasia Express train line. As soon as the train departs from Shanghai, a man on the train is murdered. The player is tasked with investigating and solving the murder across two real-time hours. The player must use the D-pad to direct the character through the main hallway and into the various rooms. In each room, the player can speak with the school girls and other passengers to inquire about circumstances surrounding the murder using a dialogue choice box. Through the investigation, the player will collect items and memos which they can view on separate screens. The player also a pocket watch to see how much time is left for their investigation.

== Cast ==
Cast as listed in the instruction booklet:

- Kanako Enomoto
- Erika Mabuchi
- Hitomi Satō
- Chiharu Niiyama
- Kyoko Fukada
- Ai Kato
- Reika Nakajima
- Mami Higashiyama
- Hiromasa Taguchi
- Youko Saitou
- Mikiyo Ōno
- Reita Serizawa
- Junji Takada

The game also features walk-in cameos from various game industry figures.
