= Manish (band) =

Japanese pop band

- Also known as: Dali
- Origin: Japan
- Genre: Power pop
- Years active: 1992–1998
- Label: Zain Records
- Past members: Misuzu Takahashi (高橋 美鈴); Mari Nishimoto (西本麻里)
- Website: Being's Official Website

Manish (マニッシュ, Manisshu) were a Japanese power pop band formed in 1992 by vocalist and lyricist Misuzu Takahashi and composer and keyboardist Mari Nishimoto. The band's name is derived from Nishimoto's name. The group was active until their disbandment in 1998.

== Biography ==
In early 1992, Misuzu Takahashi and Mari Nishimoto were members of the Japanese idol group DALI which debuted with their only single, "Moonlight Densetsu". The song was used as opening theme for anime television series Sailor Moon. Shortly after the release of the single, the group disbanded.

In December of the same year, Misuzu Takahashi and Mari Nishimoto formed Manish and debuted with the single "Koibito to Yobenai Distance" (恋人と呼べないDistance). Their second single, "Koe ni Naranaihodo ni Itoshii" (声にならないほどに愛しい) was written by Uesugi Show, the vocalist and lyricist of Japanese rock band Wands. Uesugi later recorded a self-cover of the song for the Wands studio album Little Bit. The single became one of the Manish's early hits and was their first release to be certified Gold by the Recording Industry Association of Japan (RIAJ).

Sugao no Mama ni Kiss Shiyou (素顔のままKISSしよう) was written by popular singer-songwriter Maki Ohguro, who later contributed to several other songs and also participated in recording process as a backing vocalist. Due to their similar power-pop sound and shared music producer, Masao Akashi, some fans have referred to Manish as the "female version" of the Japanese hard rock band B'z.

In 1995, their single Kirameku Toki ni Torawarete (煌めく瞬間に捕われて) was used as third ending theme for the anime television series Slam Dunk. The single has been awarded by RIAJ with platinum disk.

As one of the few Being Inc. artists, they've made multiple media appearances on Music Station.

In 1998 after releasing their compilation album Manish Best -Escalation-, they disbanded. In 2002, during the release of the compilation album Complete "Manish" at the Being Studio, two unreleased songs from their career which were added. According to the liner notes, the songs were previously recorded during production of their second studio album Individual.

Some of their music videoclips were released in 2012 at 2-disc DVD set Legend of 90s J-Rock Best Live & Clips.

In November 2003 an article by Nikkei Entertainment! reported that the duo was no longer associated with the entertainment industry and are now happy focusing on their own things. (https://ja.wikipedia.org/wiki/MANISH)

== Members ==
- Misuzu Takahashi (高橋美鈴) (BOD: February 19th, 1974) - vocalist, lyricist
- Mari Nishimoto (西本麻里) (BOD: February 9th 1973) - keyboardist, composer, backing-vocals

== Discography ==
During their career they have released three studio albums, one compilation albums and twelve singles.

=== Albums ===
==== Studio albums ====
Title	Album details	Peak chart positions
Title	Album details	JPN Oricon
Manish	Released: 14 April 1993; Label: Zain; Formats: CD, digital download	3
Individual	Released: 24 October 1994; Label: Zain; Formats: CD, digital download	5
Cheer!	Released: 8 May 1996; Label: Zain; Formats: CD, digital download	7

==== Compilation albums ====
Title	Album details	Peak chart positions
Title	Album details	JPN Oricon
Manish Best: Escalation	Released: 28 October 1998; Label: Zain; Formats: CD	7
Complete "Manish" at the Being Studio	Released: 25 October 2002; Label: Zain; Formats: CD, digital download	91
Best of Best 1000 Manish	Released: 12 October 2007; Label: Zain; Formats: CD	190

=== Singles ===
Year	Album	Chart positions (JP)	Label
1992	"Koibito to Yobenai Distance" (恋人と呼べないDistance)	—	Zain
1993	"Koe ni Naranaihodo ni Itoshii" (声にならないほどに愛しい)	28	Zain
1993	"Sugao no Mama ni Kiss shiyou" (素顔のままKISSしよう)	34	Zain
1993	"Kimi ga Hoshii Zenbu ga Hoshii" (君が欲しい 全部欲しい)	14	Zain
1994	"Nemuranai Machi ni Nagasarete" (眠らない街に流されて)	18	Zain
1994	"Dakedo Tomerarenai" (だけど 止められない)	17	Zain
1994	"Mō Dare no Me wo Kinishinai" (もう誰の目も気にしない)	5	Zain
1994	"Ashita no Story" (明日のStory)	19	Zain
1994	"Hashiridase Lonely Night" (走り出せLonely Night)	18	Zain
1995	"Kirameku Toki ni Torawarete" (煌めく瞬間に捕われて)	6	Zain
1995	"Kono Isshun to iu Eien no Naka de" (この一瞬という永遠の中で)	12	Zain
1996	"Kimi no Sora ni Naritai" (君の空になりたい)	23	Zain

== RIAJ Certifications ==
- Koe ni Naranaihodo Itoshii: Golden Disk
- Manish (album): Golden Disk
- Mou Daremo Me wo Kinishinai: Golden Disk
- Individual: Golden Disk
- Kirameku Toki ni Torawarete: Golden Disk, Platinum Disk

== Magazine appearances ==
From Music Freak Magazine:

- Vol.03: 1995/February
- Vol.15: 1996/February
- Vol.21: 1996/August
- Vol.28: 1997/March
- Vol.47: 1998/October
