= General Entertainment =

Japanese film production and video game development company

General Entertainment Co., Ltd.
- Company type: Public
- Industry: Film industry, video games
- Founded: March 4, 1994
- Defunct: August 12, 2011
- Fate: Bankruptcy
- Headquarters: Tokyo, Japan
- Key people: Kyouichi Mori (president)
- Products: Pen Pen TriIcelon; Godzilla Generations; Love Story; Alive
- Website: genet.co.jp (archived)

General Entertainment Co., Ltd. (株式会社ゼネラル・エンタテイメント, Kabushiki-gaisha Zeneraru Entateimento) was a Japanese film production company and video game developer. The company filed for bankruptcy on August 12, 2011.

== Games developed ==
- TIZ: Tokyo Insect Zoo (1996, PlayStation)
- Project V6 (1998, PlayStation)
- Pen Pen TriIcelon (1998, Dreamcast)
- Godzilla Generations (1998, Dreamcast)
- Alive (1998, PlayStation)
- Godzilla Generations: Maximum Impact (1999, Dreamcast)
- Love Story (2000, PlayStation 2)
- Combat Queen (2002, PlayStation 2)
