= Glass Fleet =

Japanese anime television series

ガラスの艦隊 (Garasu no Kantai)
- Genre: Adventure, Science fiction
- Created by: Gonzo
- Anime television series
- Directed by: Minoru Ōhara
- Produced by: Naomi Nishiguchi; Kazuhiko Inomata; Yasuhiro Sasaki
- Written by: Shōji Yonemura
- Music by: Kousuke Yamashita
- Studio: Gonzo; Satelight
- Licensed by: Crunchyroll
- Original network: ABC, TV Asahi, Animax
- English network: SEA: Animax Asia
- Original run: 4 April 2006 – 21 September 2006
- Episodes: 26

Glass Fleet (ガラスの艦隊, Garasu no Kantai), subtitled La Légende du Vent de l'Univers (lit. the Legend of the Wind of the Universe), is a Japanese anime television series, co-produced by Satelight and Gonzo, which first aired in Japan on Asahi Broadcasting Corporation from April 4, 2006, and September 21, 2006.

It spanned a total of 26 episodes, with an alternate episode 17 also being released. The series was also later broadcast by the anime television network Animax across its English-language networks in Southeast Asia and South Asia as well as its other networks worldwide.

The series, directed by Minoru Ōhara and written by Shōji Yonemura, features original character designs from Okama. The mechanical designs for the series are provided by Shōji Kawamori and Kazutaka Miyatake with Yutaka Izubuchi being the concept advisor.

== Overview ==
The series follows a war occurring in a galaxy ruled by the tyrannical self-declared Holy Emperor Vetti Lunard Sforza de Roselait. Michel Volban de Cabelle, Leader of the People's Army, opposes Vetti's rule, but the rebels are no match for the forces of Vetti's Holy Imperial Army.

In despair, Michel seeks help from an undefeatable Glass Fleet, which bears the crest of the old Royal Family. Its Captain, Cleo Aiolos Corbeille de Veil, a man of great capability, claims to be their descendant.

But things do not work well, as Cleo is now only a "Space Pirate", instead of being the Prince of the respected Royal Family, which was defeated a long time ago.

In their entwined journeys, the Emperor and the rebels encounter the Prophet Guildy, who foresees that 'When The End comes, a Two Headed Eagle will be born. One of The Heads will be clad in Metal Armor and The Other will become The God of Love. Then it will become as One to Restore the Galaxy!"

== Main characters ==
Michel Volban de Cabelle / Racine Blance Volban
The figurehead of the People's Army. She is actually the sister of the real Michel Volban who has disappeared in the war with Vetti. A man resembling her brother was part of the attack force that infiltrated the glass battleship. This man was emotionless, brainwashed and was constantly attacking Michel, but she still believed he was her brother. In the end, when this man and Cleo were about to be sucked out into the depths of space, she chose to save Cleo and said that man was no brother of hers. At the end of the episode, it was shown that the man was her real brother, as evidenced by the X-shaped scar on his back. Michel's personality is due to her past. She did not remember her mother, as she died months after Michel was born, and her father was rarely home. She learned to fight from her brother, who had become a major role model in her life. She loved fencing and wished to be like her brother(which may explain her tomboyish attitude). After her father had seen her fencing with her brother, and that she surpassed him, she was ordered to be more like a lady of a royal house. After that incident, she vowed to herself that she would become a proper lady. But after her father's death, and her brother's during the major battle in the beginning of the series, she renounces her identity and becomes her brother in order to save the People's Army from destruction. In order to do this, she chooses to truly "become" her brother, by gaining an X-shaped scar on her back like her brother had once gotten from a battle with Vetti, and also renouncing her real name, Racine Blance. All the effort to act as "Michel" was due to her love for him, which was beyond sibling love. In later episodes, she falls in love with Cleo Corbeille. She is voiced by Yuko Kaida in the original Japanese and her English voice is supplied by Laura Bailey.
Cleo Aiolos Corbeille de Veil
A supposed descendant of the royal family who has gathered a crew of people who are wanted all over the galaxy for their special abilities; they follow Cleo and later wind up following Michel in order to save Cleo. Cleo's personality is "like the wind" - to his comrades it's unpredictable where his next destination will be or which way he wavers. His rough, seemingly uncaring personality was shown bluntly to Michel and her followers when they first meet after being saved by him. At first, to Michel's servants, he seems more like a pirate than a savior: only caring about material things than anything or anyone else as he wishes for payment for saving Michel. As the storyline progresses, Cleo shows more and more defiance towards the idea of fighting with the People's Army while with them. It is not until the first big battle begins, where his newfound rival, Vetti is to be watching, that he truly becomes serious. In later episodes, he falls in love with Michel Volban (Racine Blanch). He is voiced by Kenjiro Tsuda in the Japanese version and by Travis Willingham in the English dub.
Vetti Lunard Sforza de Roselait
He takes on Michel Volban de Cabelle, the figurehead of the People's Army, and uses Michel as bait to lure out Cleo. He is the Holy Emperor, and wanted to unite the galaxy in order to be able to obtain the technology of the battleship that transcends space and time. He uses whatever means he can, even marriage to Rachel, the daughter of the Pope (who initially despises him). He also has an innate dislike (later turned obsession) for Cleo, (who he sees as a rival) and a fascination with Michel who was initially his rival before Cleo. He even goes as far as drugging and kissing Michel, who he did not know was a woman, and may have possibly raped her afterwards, as he does not confirm her accusations. After he finds out that she is a woman and not Michel, Vetti loses all interest in her and his attention turns to Cleo. Vetti revealed that he wants to obtain the technology because he has an incurable disease and may die soon. Vetti has Heterochromia - one of his eyes is gold, and one is gray. Akira Ishida (Japanese) and Ernesto Jason Liebrecht (English) provide his voice.
Jean
The loyal and faithful companion of Michel. He faithfully follows Michel, protecting her secret. Upon her request, he scarred Racine's back to resemble her brother's. He is the butler of Michel's household. He is voiced by Yasushi Miyabayashi in the Japanese version and by Robert Bruce Elliott in the English dub.
Sylua
Jean's granddaughter and Michel's maid. She follows Michel faithfully. She shows some skills in piloting ships, and has even piloted the Glass Ship in Eimer's absence. She constantly argues with Eimer, and later falls in love with Heizak. She is voiced by Shizuka Itō in the Japanese version and by Monica Rial in the English dub.
Eimer
She is the pilot of the Glass Ship. She is considered one of the best pilots, able to move the Glass Ship swiftly and effectively. She constantly teases Nowy, and has a secret crush on Cleo. At first, before she knew that Michel was actually a girl, Eimer fell for Michel. She caused the secret of Michel's gender to be revealed when she supposedly crashed into Michel's bathroom. Before, she used to live in a small village and was their leader. However, in an act to protect her village, she caused the village greater harm than good. Betrayed, she decided to take revenge on the lord who caused the mess. During this time, she had met Cleo, who quietly observed her. After she failed the attack, only barely getting past the gates, the lord's mansion lost power, sparing Eimer. Later, it is shown that because of Eimer's 'Distraction', Cleo was able to steal the power source needed for his Glass Ship, which in turn saved Eimer's life. This is when he invites Eimer to join his crew. Eimer shows a lot of enthusiasm whenever Cleo is involved, and will willingly place her life in danger to save Cleo's. Eimer is a very rough speaking person and is very tough with strangers. She is voiced by Kana Ueda in the Japanese version and by Luci Christian in the English dub.
Ralph Fitzlard Deon de Lac
A young boy who lives to serve Vetti. Always at the man's side, Ralph is a constant annoyance when trying to ensure Vetti's health. When Vetti's health starts to deteriorate, Ralph uses every means necessary to try to help, even confronting to Holy Oracle for guidance. The relationship between Ralph and Vetti is never fully explained, though it is obvious the young boy is in love with the man. These feelings are never revealed as Ralph is murdered in his misguided idea of obtaining peace in the "Black Cross", the over - ruling religion of the galaxy. He is voiced by Rie Kugimiya in the Japanese version and by Brina Palencia in the English dub.

== Staff ==
- Original concept: Gonzo
- Director: Minoru Ōhara
- Series composition: Shōji Yonemura
- Original character designs: Okama
- Animation character designs and chief animation director: Yūko Watanabe
- Mechanical designs: Shōji Kawamori, Kazutaka Miyatake
- Concept advisor: Yutaka Izubuchi
- 3D-CGI director: Hitoshi Yagishita
- Art director: Takeshi Waki
- Color settings: Kayoko Nishi
- Photography director: Teruo Abe
- Editing: Fumi Hida
- Sound director: Jin Akatagawa
- Sound production: Magic Capsule
- Music: Kōsuke Yamashita
- Animation production: Satelight, Gonzo
- Production: Asahi Broadcasting Corporation, GDH, Sotsu Agency, Sony Pictures Entertainment

== Theme songs ==
Opening theme
"Tsuyoku Tsuyoku" (ツヨクツヨク, Tsuyoku Tsuyoku) – Performance: mihimaru GT
Ending theme
"Namida Drop" (ナミダドロップ, Namida Doroppu) – Performance: Plastic Tree (eps 1-13)
"Kanata e" (彼方へ; lit. To the Other Side) – Performance: ANZA (eps 14-26)

== Episode list ==
No.	Title	Original release date
1	"Like a Shooting Star"; Transliteration: "Ryūsei no Gotoku…" (Japanese: 流星のごとく…)	TBA
2	"Like the Wind"; Transliteration: "Hayate no Gotoku…" (Japanese: 疾風のごとく…)	TBA
3	"Like Destiny"; Transliteration: "Unmei no Gotoku…" (Japanese: 運命のごとく…)	TBA
4	"Like Scars"; Transliteration: "Kizuato no Gotoku…" (Japanese: 疵痕のごとく…)	TBA
5	"Like a Mask"; Transliteration: "Kamen no Gotoku…" (Japanese: 仮面のごとく…)	TBA
6	"Like a Clown"; Transliteration: "Dōke no Gotoku…" (Japanese: 道化のごとく…)	TBA
7	"Like a Rebuke"; Transliteration: "Shitta no Gotoku" (Japanese: 叱咤のごとく…)	TBA
8	"Like the Truth"; Transliteration: "Makoto no Gotoku…" (Japanese: 真実のごとく…)	TBA
9	"Like Constant Change"; Transliteration: "Ruten no Gotoku…" (Japanese: 流転のごとく…)	TBA
10	"Like a Demon"; Transliteration: "Akki no Gotoku…" (Japanese: 悪鬼のごとく…)	TBA
11	"Like a Hungry Wolf"; Transliteration: "Garō no Gotoku…" (Japanese: 餓狼のごとく…)	TBA
12	"Like the Setting Sun"; Transliteration: "Rakujitsu no Gotoku…" (Japanese: 落日のごとく…)	TBA
13	"Like a Labyrinth"; Transliteration: "Meikyū no Gotoku…" (Japanese: 迷宮のごとく…)	TBA
14	"Like Daybreak"; Transliteration: "Yoake no Gotoku…" (Japanese: 夜明のごとく…)	TBA
15	"Like Majesty"; Transliteration: "Ifū no Gotoku…" (Japanese: 威風のごとく…)	TBA
16	"Like an Epoch"; Transliteration: "Kaiten no Gotoku…" (Japanese: 回天のごとく…)	TBA
17	"Like an Embrace"; Transliteration: "Hōyō no Gotoku…" (Japanese: 抱擁のごとく…)	TBA
18	"Like Flight"; Transliteration: "Hishō no Gotoku…" (Japanese: 飛翔のごとく…)	TBA
19	"Like a Lion"; Transliteration: "Shishi no Gotoku…" (Japanese: 獅子のごとく…)	TBA
20	"Like a Royal Road"; Transliteration: "Hadō no Gotoku…" (Japanese: 覇道のごとく…)	TBA
21	"Like a House of Cards"; Transliteration: "Gakai no Gotoku…" (Japanese: 瓦解のごとく…)	TBA
22	"Like Adoration"; Transliteration: "Dōkei no Gotoku…" (Japanese: 憧憬のごとく…)	TBA
23	"Like Scarlet"; Transliteration: "Shinku no Gotoku…" (Japanese: 深紅のごとく…)	TBA
24	"Like Bloodshed"; Transliteration: "Shura no Gotoku…" (Japanese: 修羅のごとく…)	TBA
25	"Like a Blood Edict"; Transliteration: "Kekkai no Gotoku…" (Japanese: 血戒のごとく…)	TBA
26	"Like an Ovation"; Transliteration: "Kassai no Gotoku…" (Japanese: 喝采のごとく…)	TBA

== Reception ==
"In the end, Glass Fleet tends to suffer from having too many stupid people milling about in control of massive fleets, weapons and soldiers. At this point I'm tempted to believe those stupid people may be the creative staff as this is looking like the first stages of a serious train wreck." — Chris Beveridge, Mania. "Glass Fleet is the anime fans of Last Exile have been waiting for. Suspenseful, fantastic animation, and a bevy of intriguing characters, this is an involving sci-fi drama series filled with action, mystery, and the thrilling journey of a young noble in search of justice." — Holly Ellingwood, activeAnime. "Glass Fleet is off to quite a start. The show has great pacing and exhilarating inter-stellar battles. This volume ends on quite a cliffhanger, and one would hope that Cleo will figure out Michel's secret sooner or later." — Jeffrey Harris, IGN. "Gonzo and co-producer Satelight have a great-looking piece of work here, but the story lacks a consistent tone and tries to do (and be) too many different things. The first volume shows potential but has yet to realize it." — Theron Martin, Anime News Network. "If you like politically charged sci-fi on an epic scale—along with sassy teen pilots in slinky lingerie, boozing pirates sporting eyepatches and a strong undercurrent of swirling ambisexual possibilities—Glass Fleet is definitely your show." — Jack Wiedrick, Newtype USA.
