= Kanata e =

Single by ANZA
- Released: August 2, 2006
- Recorded: Early 2006
- Genre: J-pop
- Label: Universal Music Japan
- Lyricist(s): Anza Oyama
- Producer(s): Shinya Kimura; Midori Ito

ANZA singles chronology
"Tobira wo Akete" (1999)	"Kanata e" (2006)

Kanata e (彼方へ; lit. "To the other side") is the third and last solo single of ANZA. It was released on August 2, 2006 under Universal Music Japan. This single didn't chart on the Oricon. The song was used as a 2nd ending theme for the anime Glass Fleet.

== Track list ==
All lyrics are written by Anza Ohyama.

No.	Title	Arrangers	Length
1.	"Kanata e" (彼方へ)	Shinya Kimura	5:13
2.	"Tsubasa" (翼)	Anza Ohyama	4:22
3.	"Kanata e" ((instrumental))	Shinya Kimura	5:13
4.	"Tsubasa" ((instrumental))	Anza Ohyama	4:22
