= Sakurakko Club =

- Origin: Japan
- Genres: J-pop
- Years active: 1991–1995
- Label: Nippon Columbia

Sakurakko Club (桜っ子クラブ, Sakurakko Kurabu) was a Japanese pop idol group in the early 1990s. Sakurakko Club was also the name of the television show on which they appeared alongside such groups as SMAP and Tokio.

== Members ==
- Emi Aioi (相生 恵美)
- Ayaka Akimoto (秋元 彩香)
- Ando Shokei (安藤 小径)
- Keiko Azuma (東 恵子)
- Kumiko Fujita (藤田 久美子)
- Yuki Haruhara (春原 由紀)
- Maiko Hoshino (星野 麻衣子)
- Risa Hoshino (星野 吏沙)
- Harumi Inoue (井上 晴美)
- Misako Iwana (岩名 美紗子)
- Miho Kanno (菅野 美穂)
- Noriko Kamiyama (神山 法子)
- Mayuki Kashima (鹿嶋 美由紀)
- Noriko Katō (加藤 紀子)
- Yuko Kitagawa (北川 裕子)
- Mika Kobayashi (小林 美香)
- Hiroko Kurumizawa (胡桃沢 ひろ子)
- Makoto Kurusawa (黒沢 真琴)
- Mika Mitsui (三井 美佳)
- Maki Mochida (持田 真樹)
- Ayako Morino (森野 文子)
- Junna Morita (森田 淳奈)
- Kanako Nakajo (中條 かな子)
- Ayako Nakamoto (中元 綾子)
- Miki Nakatani (中谷 美紀)
- Hiroko Nakayama (中山 博子)
- Nami Natsume (夏目 奈美)
- Chisa Okada (岡田 知沙)
- Anza Oyama (大山 アンザ)
- Shino Saito (斉藤 志乃)
- Marie Sakura (桜 まりえ)
- Mari Shimada (嶋田 茉莉)
- Reiko Shiraha (白羽 玲子)
- Nana Suzuki (鈴木 奈々)
- Mika Takegoshi (竹越 ミカ)
- Maya Yamauchi (山内 麻弥)
- Kaori Yanagi (柳香 織)

== Releases ==
- [1992.11.25] Nani ga Nandemo (なにがなんでも)
- [1993.07.01] DO-Shite (DO－して)
- [1993.08.01] La Soldier (ラ・ソウルジャー)
- [1994.08.24] Mou Ichido Waratte yo (もう一度笑ってよ)
- [1995.07.21] "Rashiku" Ikimasho / Moonlight Densetsu (”らしく”いきましょ / ムーンライト伝説) (with Meu) under name "Moon Lips"

== Spin-off ==
- Key West Club
  - Miki Nakatani
  - Keiko Azuma
- Momo
  - Anza Ohyama
  - Ayako Morino
- Moonlips
  - Anza Ohyama
  - Ayako Morino
  - Misako Kotani
  - Noriko Kamiyama
  - Nana Suzuki

== See also ==
- Sailor Moon
- Naoko Takeuchi
- Sailor Moon musicals
- Anza Ohyama

Filming locations: Seibuen Amusement Park |西武園ゆうえんち| the water park location.
