= X: Unmei no Sentaku =

2002 video game

- Developers: Taito, Atelier Double
- Publisher: Bandai
- Producer: Masa
- Artist: Clamp
- Platform: PlayStation
- Release: JP: August 22, 2002
- Genre: Fighting
- Modes: Single-player; Multiplayer

X: Unmei no Sentaku (Japanese: X ~運命の選択~; lit. X: Fateful Choice) is a fighting game created by Taito and Atelier Double and published by Bandai for PlayStation. Based on Madhouse's anime series X the game was released in Japan on August 22, 2002. The game features a total of ten fighters from two different groups present the X TV series who perform magic spells to take down each other.

== Gameplay ==
Example of gameplay involving Kamui and Seishiro

X: Unmei no Sentaku is a fighting game primarily based on the X TV series that features many special moves that did not appear in the TV anime version. It uses the same in-game engine as Taito's versus fighter Psychic Force, and has the same mechanics and control method. Since this is a competitive action game for X, it definitely needed some skills, so all the production staff put a lot of thought into creating it. For example, Arashi uses a sword, but in a battle in 3D space, he may not be able to engage in close quarters combat, so he uses high-speed movement techniques. For example, he uses a sword to fight with Inuki when attacking with a protective blade. Since it is sometimes used, things like how to add a technique that turns the dog demon into a sword. There are about 8 special moves for each character. Madhouse, who produced the TV anime version, supervised the game's original technique names and graphics that were not in the TV anime version. Thanks to that, the team thinks all the techniques turned out to be good. The voice actors yelled most of them to live up to the anime. The techniques from the work are also accurately reproduced in the game.

There are five characters that can be used in the game from the Heavenly Dragons:

- Kamui Shiro
- Sorata Arisguawa
- Arashi Kishu
- Yuzuriha Nekoi
- Subaru Sumeragi
- Karen Kasumi (Unlockable)

There are 5 "Earth Dragons":

- Fuma Monou
- Kusanagi Shiyu
- Yuto Kiigai
- Nataku
- Seishiro Sakurazuka

The teams selected interesting characters by having them perform actions. Fang Xiao and Souki were removed from the battle characters as they were not suitable for action. Souki and Firebrick could not be included due to the balance of the game. However, they appear in modes such as Omen, Dream, and Beast. Despite being based on the TV series, the game has two different endings depending on the characters chosen.

== Production ==
Producer Masa has been overseeing the manga artists group Clamp's work X both professionally and privately. When he heard that a TV anime was going to start in June 2001, he thought it would be possible to recreate the world of series in a game. Planning progressed quickly, and its eventual production with Bandai. While game was based on the TV anime version, and it was difficult to faithfully recreate that world in the game. For the game's package illustration, the staff were able to ask Clamp to draw it specifically for the game. As a first-time bonus, they prepared a jigsaw puzzle of the package illustration. This is a bonus for the first production only, leading to quick preorders. In order to make the game stand out, the staff included several illustrations and movies. There are illustrations drawn from the anime for this game, totaling 200 illustrations. Meanwhile, there are 40 drawings. Characters other than the player characters, such as Kotori, Ding, and Gen, also appear in the movie, fully reproducing the world of "X". The voice actors appearing in the game are exactly the same casting as the TV anime version as the producer expected to recreate the most memorable lines.

The game's opening and ending movies were created by Madhouse. Since the game is primarily action, the opening videos is completely new game that focuses on battle scenes. These movies were completed at the very end of the schedule, and it was a struggle to make it in time for the game's production. The theme song is the same as the theme song for the TV anime version, and is sung by "eX Dream" by Masatoshi Nishimura (credited as "Myuji") which had been released on CD by Victor Entertainment. There are some parts of this game that the producer asked Myuji to record but remained vague about this on purpose. This time, he would like to talk about the reason why we created 'Unmei no Sentaku as a competitive action game. What was difficult was having to make the characters made with polygons resemble the TV anime version. In anime, there is a certain angle at which the character is shown, but in the game we created a three-dimensional character that can be seen from 360 degrees, so the character has to look like that from every angle. It was really difficult to complete this. In particular, Kamui, Fūshin, Arashi, and Seishiro were completed through numerous revisions. When it was completed, Masa felt that all the hard work he had put into using the PlayStation's capacity to the limit of its display had paid off. Arashi was the character that he had a hard time giving shape to. It was difficult to deal with things like hair and sailor uniforms. On the other hand, Sorata was the easiest to make. His actions were full of energy and his character was easy to understand. Kusanagi was also easy to make.

At first, the game was set thought about making it into an adventure game or a puzzle game, but it became thought a competitive action game would be the best way to properly recreate the world of X in a game. He thought a 3D action movie where the player fight in a 360-degree field would be better. He went to Taito, who has a proven track record, to consult about production, and the project came to be in its current form. Furthermore, the game operations for X are made very simple. Even difficult commands can be issued with a single button in order to appeal to newcomers of action games. Players can choose up to 8 difficulty levels, from easy to difficult, so we think it will be enjoyed by a wide range of players, from beginners to advanced competitive action game players. The studio tried to make the scenes where the characters actually move closer to the TV anime version.
