= Love Story (video game) =

2000 video game

- Developer: General Entertainment
- Publisher: Enix
- Platform: PlayStation 2
- Release: JP: April 27, 2000
- Genres: Adventure, interactive movie, visual novel
- Mode: Single-player

Love Story, stylized as Ø Story, is a Japanese exclusive adventure interactive movie video game developed by General Entertainment and published by Enix on April 27, 2000. It was the first Enix game published on the PlayStation 2, and was part of the campaign to promote the release of the console in Japan.

The player takes the role of a young man who dies in a motorcycle accident. He is sent back to earth as a ghost by Ai, the angel of love, who tells him that he may revive if he gains the love of a girl named Rina within six days. The female cast of the game is composed of Japanese television actresses and models. Reviews of the game range from average to negative, with criticism of the game's graphics and acting.

== Gameplay ==
The interface of the game, with the love meter (bottom left) and the number of arrows available (bottom right).

Love Story is an interactive movie in which the story is depicted in continuous full motion videos. The player can make various actions at set moments (such as communicating by writing on sand, chalkboards, or computer screens) which result in slightly different paths and scenes, although the direction of the story remains globally the same. Events similar to the quick time events featured in Sega's game Shenmue are also present. They require the player to trigger an action by quickly pushing a button when an "O" flashes on-screen.

The player can shoot arrows at Rina, which allow to read her mind in text dialogues or cutscenes. Minigames are present, including baseball and rhythm games. All these actions can increase or decrease the player's "love meter" depending on his success, and the objective of the game is to fill the love meter to 100 percent by the end of the sixth day.

== Development ==
In August 1999, Enix' Chief of General Affairs Kouichi Hasegawa announced to Bloomberg News that four titles were in development in the company for the upcoming Sony PlayStation 2 console. While he had not revealed the names of the games, it was known that one of them would reportedly feature large quantities of full motion videos in DVD format.

Love Story was showcased in February 2000 with the presence of the game's actresses at the PlayStation Festival in Tokyo, as part of Sony's campaign to promote the soon-to-be-released PlayStation 2. The title was Enix' second adventure game in full motion video, following Murder on the Eurasia Express (1998). The cast recruited for Love Story includes Japanese actresses, television personalities, and models; notably Aya Hirayama and Kaori Manabe, who would later star in the Waterboys film and television series, respectively; and Erika Yamakawa.

A game demo was given to video game journalists in March, and the game was showcased a second time, at the Tokyo Game Show in April, where it was one of the most visited Enix attractions after Dragon Quest VII. The gaming website IGN attributes this popularity to the fact that, earlier in the year, screenshots of the game had shown two female characters about to kiss each other. The release of the game, however, revealed that there is no lesbianism in the story and that one of the women featured in the kissing scene is in fact possessed by the (male) player character's ghost.

The music of Love Story was composed by Konatsu Yuzunogi and includes two vocal songs, "Hello Again" and "Old Friend", both sung by Aya Hirayama with lyrics written by Haru Yuki. The original soundtrack of the game was published in Japan on May 17, 2000, by First Smile Entertainment. It comprises 36 tracks.

== Reception ==
In Japan, Famitsu scored the game a 29 out of 40.

The game received mediocre reviews in English-speaking territories. Reviewers for IGN and GameSpot compared the game to Digital Pictures' Sega CD games and its storyline to the film Ghost. GameSpot gave the game a 5.8 out of 10, stating that the video quality was good, despite occasional compression artifacts, while the few non-video sections were considered "more like average PlayStation graphics than those of a PlayStation 2 game". GameSpot noted that an understanding of the Japanese language is indispensable to play the game, and that even then non-Japanese players are likely to find Love Story odd due to the high amount of cultural references present in the game.

IGN, however, felt that the quality of the graphics varies greatly, with the worst instances being comparable to "a heavily-artifacted RealVideo file". The site also stated that these artifacts are "awful" and detrimental in one of the minigames in which the player must search for a girl hiding in a large crowd. IGN also rated the acting as particularly bad, "on the same level as a good episode of Power Rangers", although some performances were seen as better than others. They also felt that the interactions between the real actors and the computer-generated image of the ghost were awkward. Regarding the sound quality, they remarked that all looped dialogues have a high-pitched frequency playing in the background, which can be annoying for sensitive hearing. Finally, they noted that the game is short and provides "a few hours of dumb fun" despite spanning two DVDs.
