= Psychic Force =

1996 video game

- Arcade flyer
- Developer: Taito
- Publisher: Taito; PlayStation: NA/EU: Acclaim Entertainment
- Producer: Takeshi Kamimura
- Designers: Takeshi Kamimura; Hiroshi Aoki
- Programmers: Hiroshi Aoki; Takashi Kurosawa; Kosuke Usami
- Artists: Takayuki Isobe; Yuji Sakamoto; Hiroto Niizato
- Composer: Hideki Takahagi
- Platforms: Arcade, PlayStation
- Release: Arcade: JP: April 1996 (Note: One source claimed a release date of October 1995); NA: 1996; PlayStation: JP: October 4, 1996; NA: April 1997; PAL: July 1997
- Genre: Fighting
- Modes: Single-player, multiplayer
- Arcade system: Taito FX-1A

Psychic Force (サイキックフォース, Saikikku Fōsu) is a 3D fighting video game for arcades, produced by Taito. It was first available for location testing in October 1995 before the final version was released in April 1996. The game was later ported that year and in 1997 to the PlayStation, with Acclaim releasing it in North America and PAL regions. The game combines the normal features of an arcade fighting game with psychic powers. Psychic Force was released with little fanfare and was not commercially successful in the West, but it did gain a degree of popularity in Japan.

Psychic Force would later get an arcade-exclusive update titled Psychic Force EX, which was released a year later in 1996. EX made the final boss playable without using a code, added new color schemes for the costumes, and improved and balanced the gameplay. The PlayStation version was based on EX. In 1998, a sequel was released under the title Psychic Force 2012 also for the arcade, and was ported to the Dreamcast console in 1999 and eventually adapted to the PlayStation under the title Psychic Force 2. In 2005, the original Psychic Force was re-released as part of as an anniversary pack for the PlayStation 2 titled Psychic Force Complete, which had included Psychic Force 2012 and a special exclusive remixed version of 2012 titled Psychic Force 2012 EX.

== Gameplay ==
Gameplay screenshot (arcade version)

All combat in Psychic Force takes place in a cubic space defined by a magical force field. The fighters float inside this space and are capable of movement in all directions. Even though Psychic Force is structured as a 3D game, the gameplay is in 2D.

The walls of the force field play a big part in the strategy behind Psychic Force. A character takes damage when they're forced into a wall by their opponent. The characters do not take damage, however, if they move into the wall themselves. If a character takes another hit as they bounce off from the wall, the character will become stunned and fall through the air. The character is eventually invulnerable while they're falling.

As in most fighting games, the first character to win two rounds wins the match. If time runs out, the players are taken to a sudden death round in which the space is much smaller and both characters have 0% Psycho Gauge. The first person to land an attack in this sudden death round wins the round. When the player is fighting a computer-controlled opponent, however, the character with more health remaining when time runs out wins that round, without going to sudden death.

The characters are controlled with an eight directional joystick and three buttons which dictate a guard, a light attack, and a heavy attack. By combining these different commands, the player can make combo attacks, throws, and special moves which can break the enemy's defenses.

A character's special move is determined by the Psycho Gauge, which is seen under the Life Gauge of the character. Depending on the type of special move initiated, the Psycho Gauge will immediately drain from within sight and once the character uses up their entire Psycho Gauge, they'll be left with the only option to unleash continuous weak projectiles until the Psycho Gauge is charged back up, either through an automatic slow charge or a manual fast charge in which the player can press all three buttons to help re-charge their Psycho Gauge.

Other tactics in Psychic Force include a Barrier Guard, which can be used to help protect a character from both physical attacks and special moves but drains the Psycho Gauge real quickly, an Evasion Barrier, in which the character can immediately put up a force field and avoid slamming against the wall even though it uses up 40% of the Psycho Gauge, a Normal Dash which enables a character to move real quickly in any direction from within sight, and a Quick Dash which enables a character to move real fast towards their opponent while being able to deflect any weak projectile that gets in their way.

In both the original arcade version and home console Story Mode of Psychic Force (but not later revisions of the arcade version), the player's character goes through eight stages of combat against a specific set of opponents and face off against a specific final boss in the eighth and final stage, which varies and depends on the player character's story. The home console Story Mode adds additional cut-scenes in order to advance the story.

== Story ==
The plot of Psychic Force takes place in the year 2010, where selected individuals are blessed with the power of psychic abilities. All people imbued with this power are called "Psychiccers" and uses a specific element such as fire, light, wind, electricity, gravity, time, or ice in fighting.

Psychiccers are shunned by normal people in general because of their unnatural abilities and that most cases turn violent and deadly from within sight. All of that changes one day when a mysterious Psychiccer organization known as NOA appears and offers Psychiccers a place from within their company. Headed by a young British Psychiccer man named Keith Evans, NOA seeks to create a perfect utopia for Psychiccers and that they'll eliminate anyone who tries to stand in their way.

Challenging NOA's ambition is a small independent group known as Anti-NOA and that one of its members, a young American Psychiccer man named Burn Griffiths, seeks to confront and stop his old friend Keith from going through with his extreme plans of creating a Psychiccer-only world.

== Characters ==
There are eight playable characters and a final boss who is playable through the use of a code.

- Burn Griffiths: The main protagonist of the series. A young American Psychiccer man who has the ability to use the psychic power of fire in battle. Burn seeks to find his old friend Keith so that he can convince him to give up his ambition of creating a Psychiccer-only world.
- Emilio Michaelov: A young Russian Psychiccer boy who has the ability to use the psychic power of light in battle. Emilio is very scared of his own ability and only seeks peace and solitude.
- Wendy Ryan: A young Australian Psychiccer girl who has the ability to use the psychic power of wind in battle. Wendy seeks to find her long-lost older sister Chris and suspects that NOA may have the answers to her questions.
- Sonia (Chris Ryan): A young bioroid Psychiccer woman who has the ability to use the psychic power of electricity in battle. While Sonia serves NOA and Keith with undying loyalty, she is actually Wendy's older sister Chris, who was kidnapped and remade into a bioroid by Wong.
- Brad Kilsten: A young German Psychiccer man who has the ability to use the psychic power of gravity in battle. Having a split personality disorder, Brad is unpredictable in battle as his gentle side clashes with his psychotic side.
- Richard Wong: A Hong Kong Chinese Psychiccer man who has the ability to use the psychic power of time in battle. Even though Wong serves as Keith's consultant and strategist in NOA, he secretly seeks to eliminate Keith so that he can advance his own ambition of conquering the world.
- Rokudo Genma: A Japanese Yamabushi monk/priest who can use Shugendo magic in battle. Genma is a unique character in that his psychic power comes from faith in the gods and takes the form of traditional magic. Genma is convinced that psychic power is a double-edged sword not meant for use by mortals and thus seeks to eliminate all Psychiccers.
- Gates Oltsman: An American cybernetic soldier who relies on his own enhancements in battle. Upon surviving a devastating Psychiccer attack that had taken the lives of his wife Cheryl and their daughter Tina, Gates, who was reborn as a cyborg, seeks revenge against all Psychiccers.
- Keith Evans: A young British Psychiccer man who serves as the leader of NOA and that he has the ability to use the psychic power of ice in battle. Keith's ultimate goal is to create a utopia for Psychiccers and that he will eliminate anyone who tries to stand in his way.

== Development ==
The concept for Psychic Force originated at Taito around 1991–1992, following the popularity of Capcom's Street Fighter II. According to programmer Hiroshi Aoki, Taito held an internal competition for fighting game concepts, during which the idea of characters fighting in mid-air was proposed. Aoki produced an early two-dimensional prototype in 1992, initially known as Psychic Fire, but development was abandoned because of the difficulties involved in animating characters from multiple angles using sprites. The concept was revived following the introduction of three-dimensional graphics hardware.

The development team had initially been working on a two-dimensional sequel to Taito's Kaiser Knuckle, but changed direction after being instructed to develop a game for the company's three-dimensional FX-1 arcade hardware. The team decided against creating a conventional three-dimensional fighting game, instead emphasizing aerial combat and freedom of movement. An early concept involving robotic characters was abandoned in favour of characters possessing psychic abilities, which producer Takeshi Kamimura believed would allow players to relate more easily to the characters. Kamimura stated that the game's development took approximately ten months.

The game's visual design was influenced by Japanese anime and manga. Aoki later identified Locke the Superman as a major influence, while the character Keith Evans drew inspiration from the designs of manga artist Shotaro Ishinomori. The development team sought to emphasize characterization and storytelling, selecting voice actors based on their suitability for each character rather than their popularity.

Several planned gameplay features were abandoned during development, including destructible environments, objects that could be used as weapons and a selectable camera perspective. Aoki explained that some environmental interactions had been removed because they interfered with the visibility of the characters during combat. The development team also conducted location tests in which players could leave written feedback regarding character balance and gameplay.

The PlayStation version featured an animated opening produced by Studio Live and J.C.Staff, with character illustrations by Kenichi Ohnuki. The opening theme, "On the Verge of Revival", and ending theme, "Just Say You'll Be Ever Mine", were performed by Hironobu Kageyama, with music composed by Hideki Takahagi and lyrics by IMOIMO.

=== Localization ===
The PlayStation version was published in North America and Europe by Acclaim Entertainment in 1997. Unlike the original Japanese release, the Western version featured English-dubbed dialogue. Christian Nutt of GameSpot subsequently criticized the English voice acting of the original game in his review of Psychic Force 2012, contrasting it with Acclaim's decision to retain Japanese dialogue with English subtitles in the sequel. In a 2023 retrospective, Retro Gamer also remarked upon the original game's English dubbing.

== Reception ==
Reception

Review scores
| Publication | Score |
|---|---|
| Electronic Gaming Monthly | 5/10 (PS) |
| Next Generation | 3/5 (PS) |
| Dengeki PlayStation | 90/100, 85/100, 75/100, 85/100 (PS) |

In Japan, Game Machine listed Psychic Force on their June 1, 1996 issue as being the third most-successful arcade game of the month.

The PlayStation version received mediocre reviews. A reviewer for Next Generation said that while the 3D movement seems innovative at first, it is only a novelty and, in combination with the limited number of close-range attacks, makes the fights dominated by cheap projectile attacks. He remarked, "On the positive side, Psychic Force does sport some nice - and if truth be told, very innovative - projectile weapons and background graphics. Unfortunately, these positive factors don't do enough to make up for the game's consistently mediocre gameplay." The four reviewers of Electronic Gaming Monthly similarly commented that the game seemed innovative at first, but was essentially a standard fighter with a heavy reliance on cheap projectile attacks and characters who all use the same move set apart from a few special attacks. They cited the anime video sequences as the game's strong point. Scary Larry of GamePro praised the music but found the combos lacking, and concluded, "The game can be mastered easily, which makes it boring in the long run. In all, Psychic Force is a Force to be reckoned with - at least as a rental."

M! Games gave it a score of 52/100.

== Legacy ==
Although Psychic Force achieved limited commercial success in Western markets, it developed a dedicated following in Japan, particularly among female players. Taito's official corporate history records that approximately 2,500 people attended the "Psychic Junkie Fair" held at Sunshine City in Ikebukuro on February 2, 1997. The event featured a gaming tournament, a concert by Taito's musical group Zuntata and a cosplay competition. The popularity of Psychic Force was also highlighted at a Psychic Force conference held in Tokyo, when news of the 1998 sequel Psychic Force 2012 was announced to a crowd dressed up as their favorite characters.

In a 2017 retrospective interview, programmer Hiroshi Aoki and sound designer Katsuhisa Ishikawa discussed the game's unexpected popularity among women. Aoki recalled seeing numerous fans cosplaying as its characters at the Tokyo Game Show, while both developers described a substantial fan-created doujinshi community at Comiket. They also recalled receiving boxes of Valentine's Day chocolates addressed to the game's characters, particularly Keith Evans, whose fictional birthday was February 14. Aoki attributed part of the game's appeal to its characterization and relatively open-ended narrative, which encouraged fans to develop their own interpretations of the characters and their relationships.

The series continued through subsequent releases, including the aforementioned sequel Psychic Force 2012. In December 2012, Taito re-released the sequel for its NESiCAxLive arcade distribution system, introducing higher-resolution graphics. A twentieth-anniversary celebration was held at e-sports SQUARE Akihabara on October 9, 2016, featuring competitive matches, developer and voice actor discussions, and a live musical performance by Zuntata.

Despite the continued fan following, further sequels remained unrealized. In 2017, Aoki stated that he had repeatedly proposed developing another installment, but that the disappointing sales of Psychic Force 2012 had been a major obstacle. He nevertheless expressed interest in revisiting the series using modern hardware. In September 2026, Japanese company Cosmo Machia announced plans to release an updated port of Psychic Force 2012 for Nintendo Switch, PlayStation 5 and Windows via Steam in 2027.

== OVA ==
In 1998, a two-episode anime OVA was released, animated by Triangle Staff.

The first episode describes Keith's escape from the laboratory where he was being experimented on. Burn almost hits him with his motorcycle, and takes a frightened Keith home. Three men in dark suits come looking for Keith, who uses his psychic abilities to injure two of them, and chase the third out. When Burn tries to help Keith escape, they are ambushed and, despite Keith's best efforts, he is dragged away, leaving Burn lying on the ground, which awakens his powers.

The second episode features Keith and Burn several years later, where Keith has been taken under the wing of Wong, head of NOA. Keith declares his vision of peace to the world, and begins to round up lost Psychiccers. Burn's dormant psychic abilities are detected by Gates, who tries to attack Burn, but Burn is saved by Keith and Sonia. While Burn is in NOA HQ with Keith, he berates him for trying to start a war between humans and Psychiccers, then leaves with Wendy and Emilio. He eventually heads back to confront Keith, but their fight is interrupted by Wong who triggers the self-destruct for the NOA HQ. Keith traps Burn in a cocoon of ice, leaving him as the only survivor.

This anime OVA's English dub was produced by RLJ Films, and came out in 2002 in the U.S. For some reason, all of the voice actors remain unknown.

== Psychic Force: Puzzle Taisen ==
There is a spin-off puzzle game, similar in style to Puzzle Bobble, known as Psychic Force: Puzzle Taisen, developed by C. P. Brain and published by Taito, which was released on October 2, 1997, for Sony PlayStation in Japan only. The game features single-player puzzle and story modes, alongside two-player competitive gameplay. It was released on two discs, with the second, titled Premium CD-ROM, containing promotional videos for Taito games, a music gallery and a library of character voice recordings.

== See also ==
- Fighters' Impact, another fighting game from Taito from the same year
- Senko no Ronde, a similar game based on projectile attacks and flying characters.
- X: Unmei no Sentaku, a licensed game with similar gameplay.
- Astra Superstars, a 2D game that also has airborne-based gameplay.
