= Hiroko Kurumizawa =

Japanese singer (born 1974)

Hiroko Kurumizawa 胡桃沢 ひろこ
- Born: January 4, 1974 (age 52); Niigata, Japan
- Genres: J-pop
- Occupation: Singer
- Instrument: Vocals
- Years active: 1991–present
- Labels: Victor Entertainment; Sons Entertainment

Hiroko Kurumizawa (胡桃沢 ひろこ, Kurumizawa Hiroko) is a Japanese singer. In 1991, she became a member of Sakurakko Club, together with Anza Oyama, Miki Nakatani, Miho Kanno, and Noriko Katō. Her real name is Hiroko Yamazaki (山崎 裕子, Yamazaki Hiroko).
