= Head Phones President =

Japanese metal band

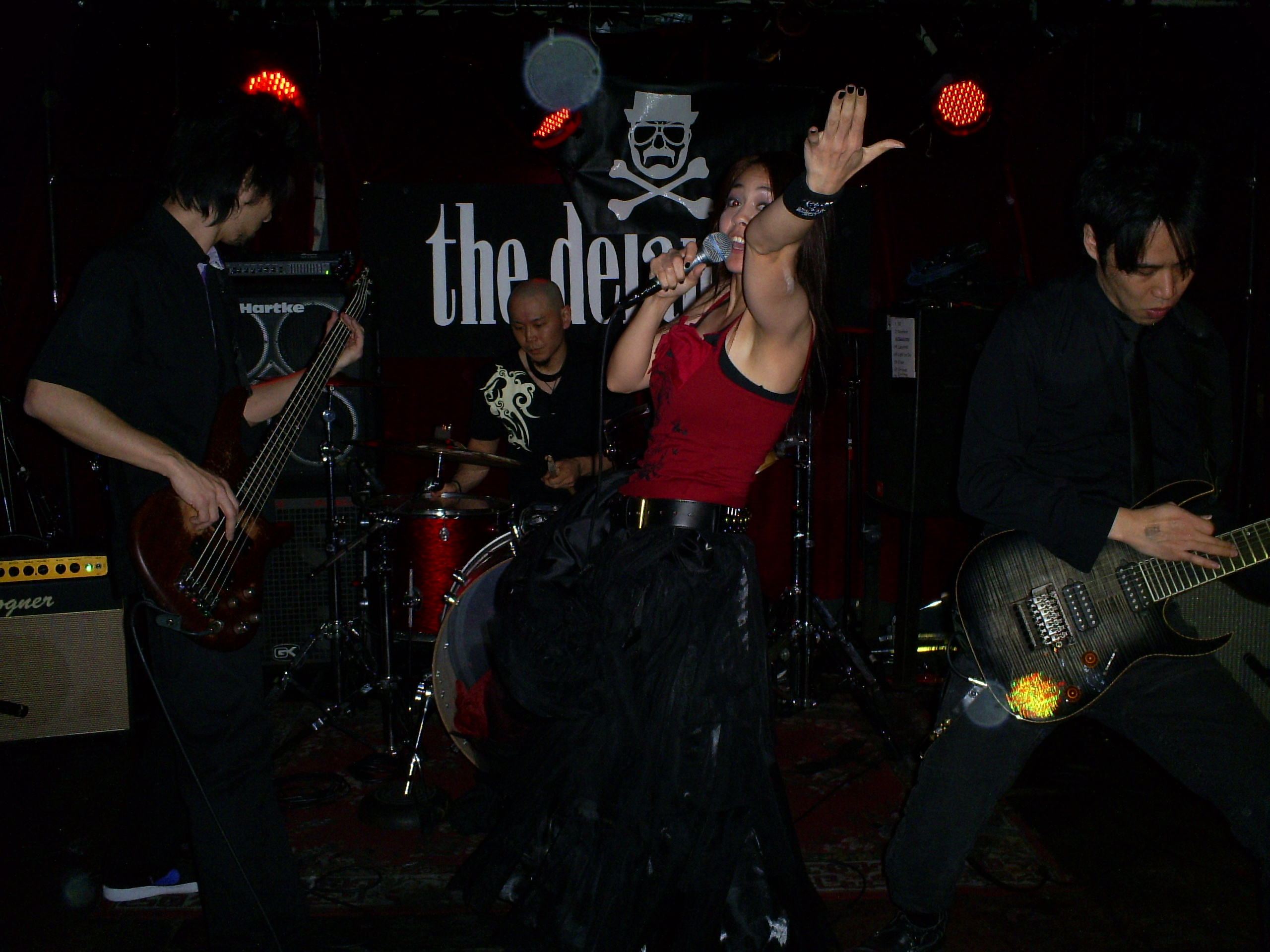
- Head Phones President in New York City, 2010

Background information
- Also known as: HPP, Deep Last Blue
- Origin: Tokyo, Japan
- Genres: Alternative metal; nu metal; progressive metal; avant-garde metal
- Years active: 1999–present
- Labels: Sound Ship (2000–2001); Ex Tribe (2002); Howling Bull (2003); Tribe Gate (2004); Typhoon Japan (2005); United Asia Link (2007); Spiritual Best (2009); Tower (2010); Radtone Music (2012–)
- Members: Anza; Hiro; Narumi; Batch
- Past members: Kawady; Take; Okaji; Mar
- Website: headphonespresident.com

Head Phones President (stylized in all caps) is a Japanese metal band formed in Tokyo in 1999. Their sound has been described as alternative metal, progressive metal, avant-garde metal, and nu metal.

They have played various music festivals, including Loud Park 08, Taste of Chaos, Metal Female Voices Fest, sharing the stage with the likes of Slipknot, Avenged Sevenfold, Story of the Year, and In This Moment. They have also played in the U.S., Sweden, Australia, neighboring Asian countries, and South America.

== History ==
After vocalist Anza Ohyama ceased performing in Sailor Moon musicals in 1998, she embarked on a solo career for almost two years. Influenced by female rock artists of the time such as Nanase Aikawa, she abandoned her idol image and sang pop rock music. However, after hearing hide's song "Pink Spider", she desired to write songs about dark and negative things, but which show people how to aim for the light. Leaving her talent agency, Anza teamed up with guitarist Hiro, who previously helped her in her solo career, and his brother Mar. With a desire to play heavier music, they formed the band Deep Last Blue. They found bassist Kawady and drummer Okaji and changed their name to Head Phones President before releasing their first single, "Escapism", in 2000. Bassist Kawady left soon after and was replaced by Take the following year.

Playing at small venues all over Japan, they started to gain more popularity. In 2002, Head Phones President released the EP ID, after which Take left due to family reasons and was replaced by Narumi. A fan of the band, Narumi, who was formerly a guitarist, had often found himself employed as a staff member by the group before joining. That year, Head Phones President had their first international tour, including a stop in New York City.

Head Phones President's first album Vary was released in late 2003, after which the band returned to America for another short tour and started releasing CDs in the United States. Okaji left the band in October 2004, desiring to make his own music. They recruited support drummer Batch in January 2005 (he was made an official member on February 1, 2009). They continued to tour Japan, taking intermittent breaks to allow Anza to work on her solo career.

Head Phones President released their first DVD, Toy's Box, in August 2006. The band desired to tour Europe, and in February 2007, they went to Sweden for two performances. In November, they performed at the Pacific Media Expo in Los Angeles, California. Their second full-length album Folie a Deux was released on December 12.

In July 2008, they played the Formoz Music Festival in Taipei, Taiwan, and would return to the city again in July 2009. On October 7, 2009, the mini album Prodigium was released on the Spiritual Beast label, and was mastered at West Side Music by Alan Douches (Mastodon, The Agonist).

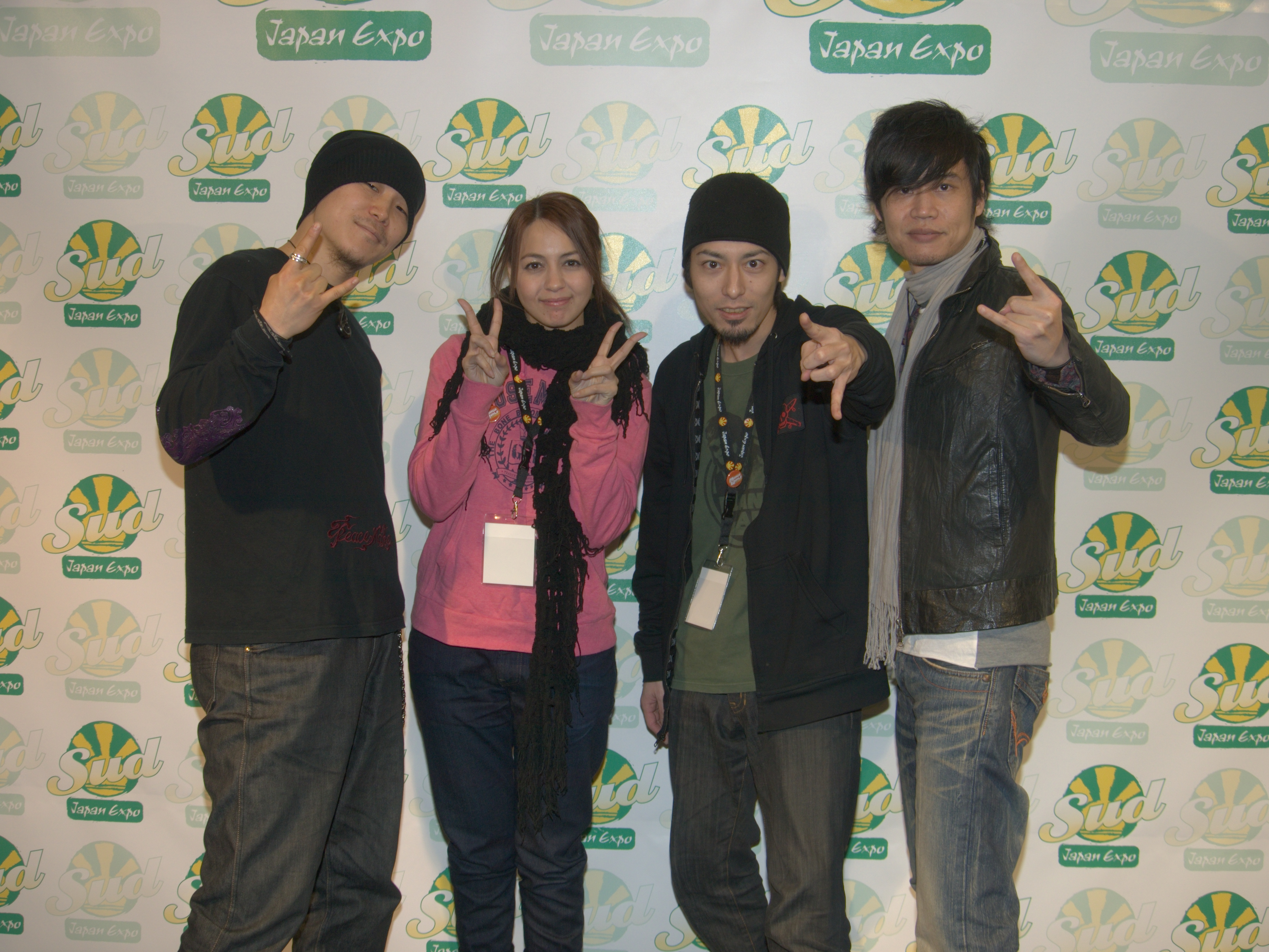
Batch, Anza, Narumi and Hiro at Japan Expo Sud 2011 in France

On September 3, 2010, they released the self-cover album Pobl Lliw, which includes rearranged versions of old songs as well as some all new tracks. On September 19, 2010, Head Phones President performed at D'erlanger's Abstinence's Door #005 with defspiral and Girugamesh. The concert was streamed worldwide live on Ustream.tv. The band returned to New York City to play three shows as part of Frank Wood's 10 Days of Wood music event in November. On November 24, 2010, the band announced that guitarist Mar had resigned from the band due to unspecified personal reasons. The band publicly wished him well and stated that they would continue activities without him.

On April 2, 2012, Head Phones President released "Purge the World", a memorial single for their US tour which began on April 6. Their third full-length album Stand in the World was released on June 6, 2012. In December 2013, the band went on a four date tour of China that took them to Hong Kong, Guangzhou, Beijing, and Shanghai.

Head Phones President released their fourth album Disillusion on August 6, 2014. They also performed at Yoko Fest The Final on September 12 in memory of United's deceased bassist and leader and at Belgium's Metal Female Voices Fest on October 17 and 19, 2014. The band released their first compilation album Alteration on November 18, 2015, which also includes six remixes, in celebration of the 15th anniversary of their first EP.

The music of Head Phones President was the genesis of the rock musical Stand in the World, written and directed by Shohei Hayashi, which ran at the Tokyo Arts Center from June 11–13, 2016. The band performed during the show which starred Erika Yamakawa, Manabu Oda, and Hikari Ono.

Their fifth studio album, Realize, was released on May 17, 2017. Respawn followed two years later on July 24, 2019. In the Abyss, their seventh album, was released on July 10, 2024.

Head Phones President are scheduled to perform in Brazil at SANA in Fortaleza in January 2025; and in Spain at the Rock Imperium Festival in June 2025.

== Musical style ==
The band has described their music as "negative" due to their emotional lyrics that stem from traumatic experiences, but believe the music expresses their struggles in a hopeful manner. For example, the song "Alien Blood" represents Anza's troubles growing up in Japan as mixed race; "I had problems with other students. People would try to burn my house". She writes all of the lyrics, but Narumi helps translate them into English. Anza has stated that she wanted to be the female version of hide, an influence that inspired her to express herself in a way that she could not in the pop music she used to make before Head Phones President. Anza and Narumi like nu metal from the 2000s, such as Korn and Limp Bizkit, while Hiro prefers older metal from Los Angeles. In addition to the bands Nirvana and Boøwy, the members have also cited non-musical influences such as actress Minako Honda, mafia films, and director Martin Scorsese.

== Members ==
Current members

- Anza Ohyama – vocals (1999–present)
- Hiroaki "Hiro" Saito – guitar (1999–present)
- Ryuichiro Narumi – bass (2002–present)
- Batch – drums (2009–present, support member from 2005 to 2009)

Former members

- Kawady – bass (2000)
- Take – bass (2002)
- Okaji – drums (2000–2004)
- Mar – guitar (1999–2010)

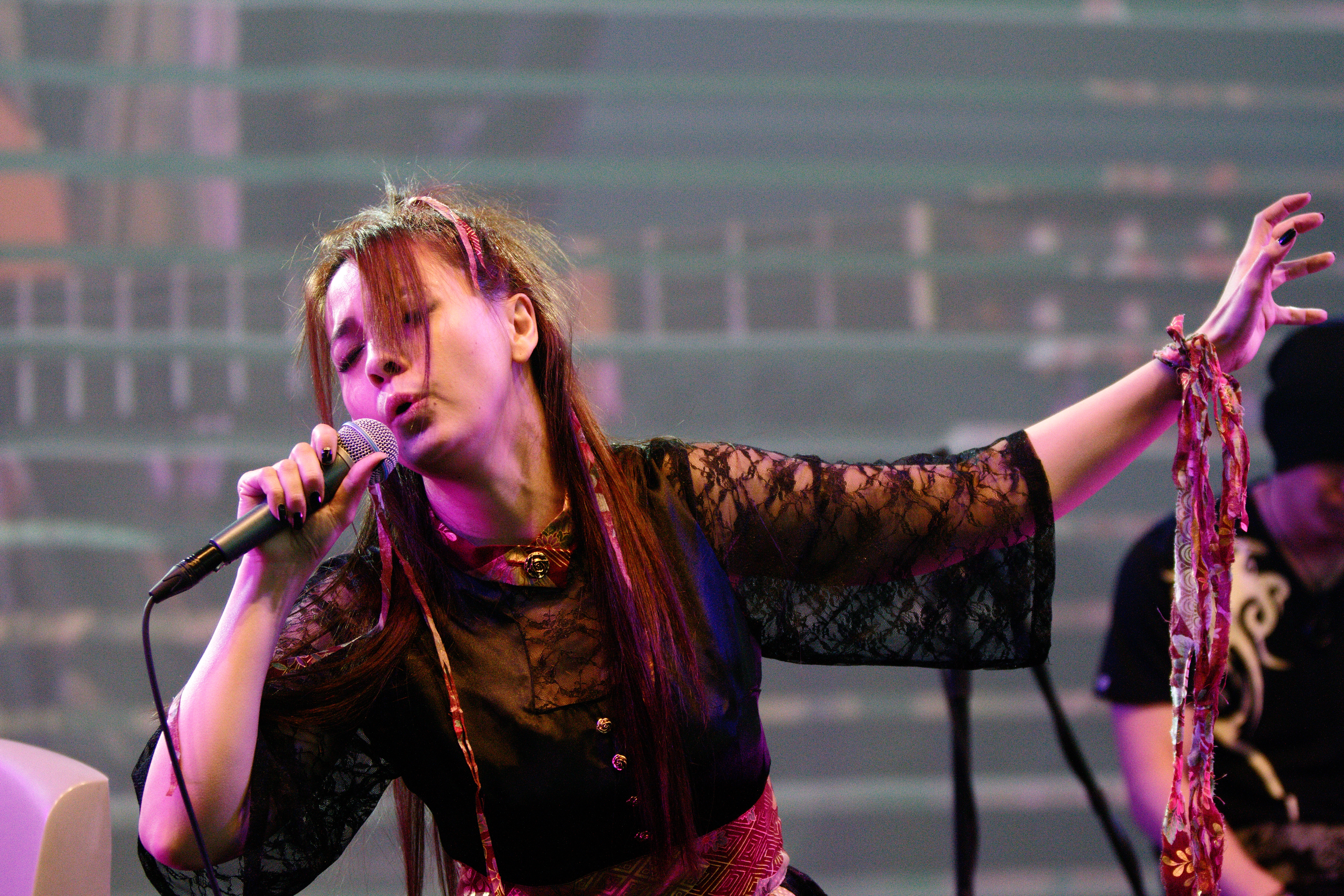
Anza

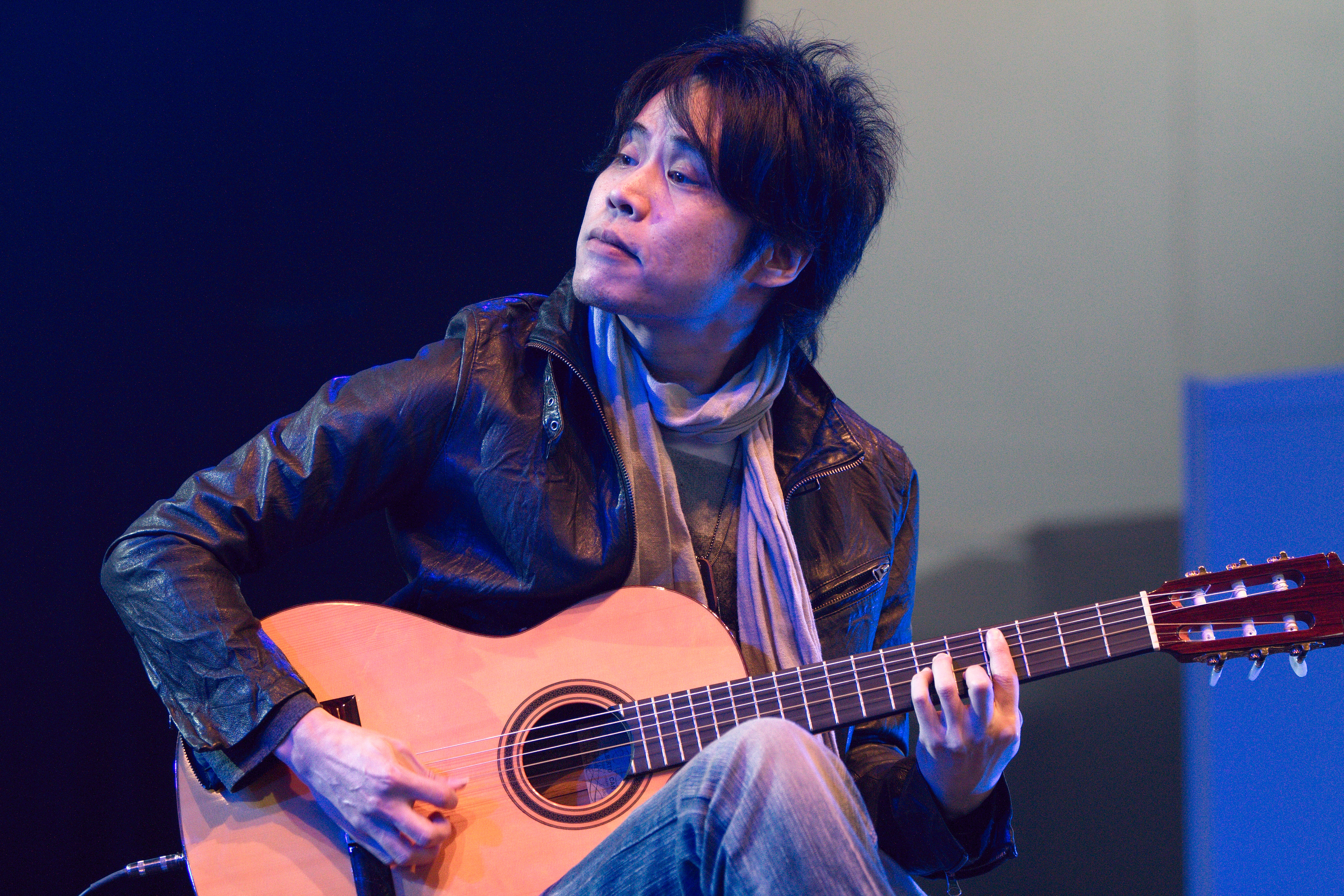
Hiro

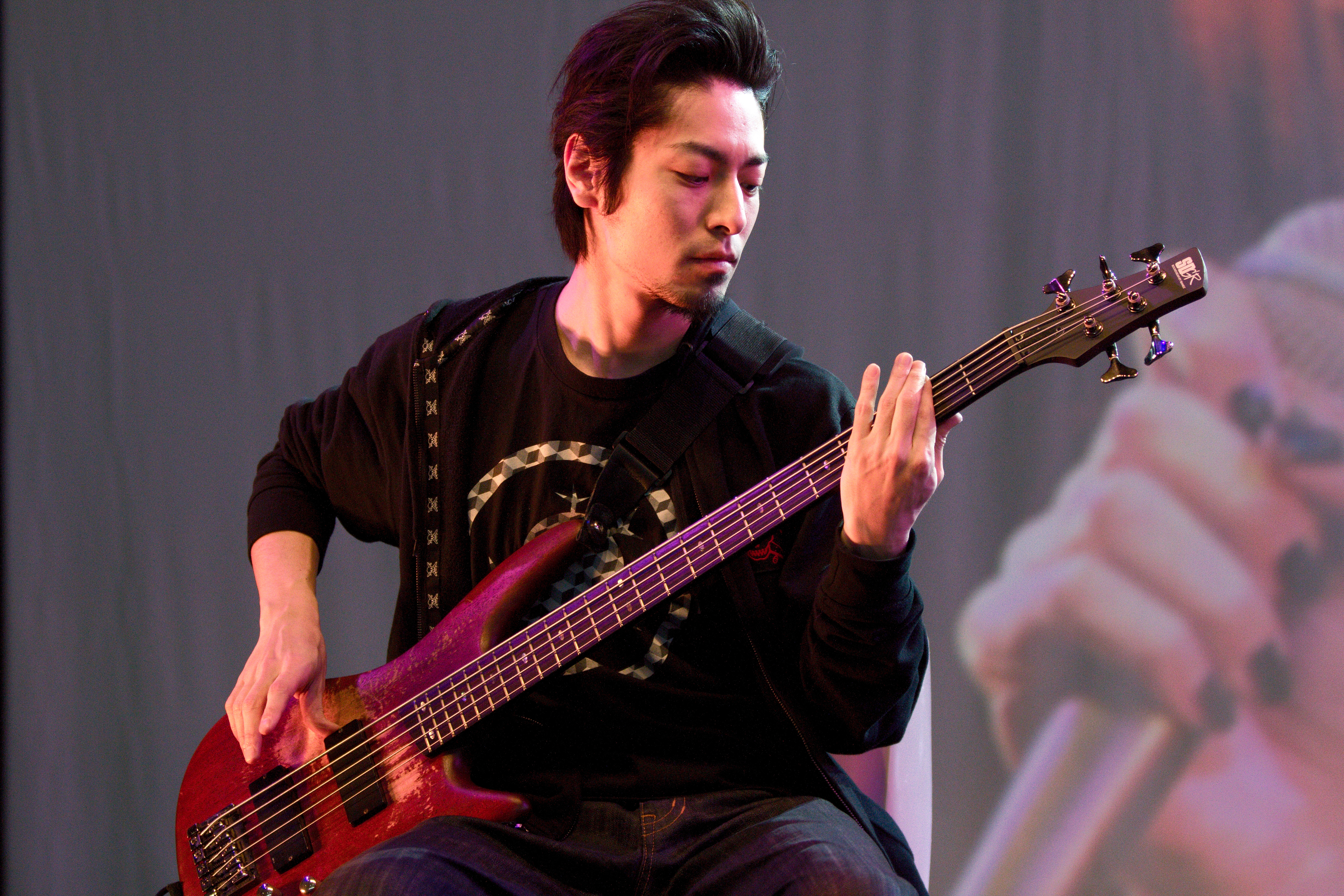
Narumi

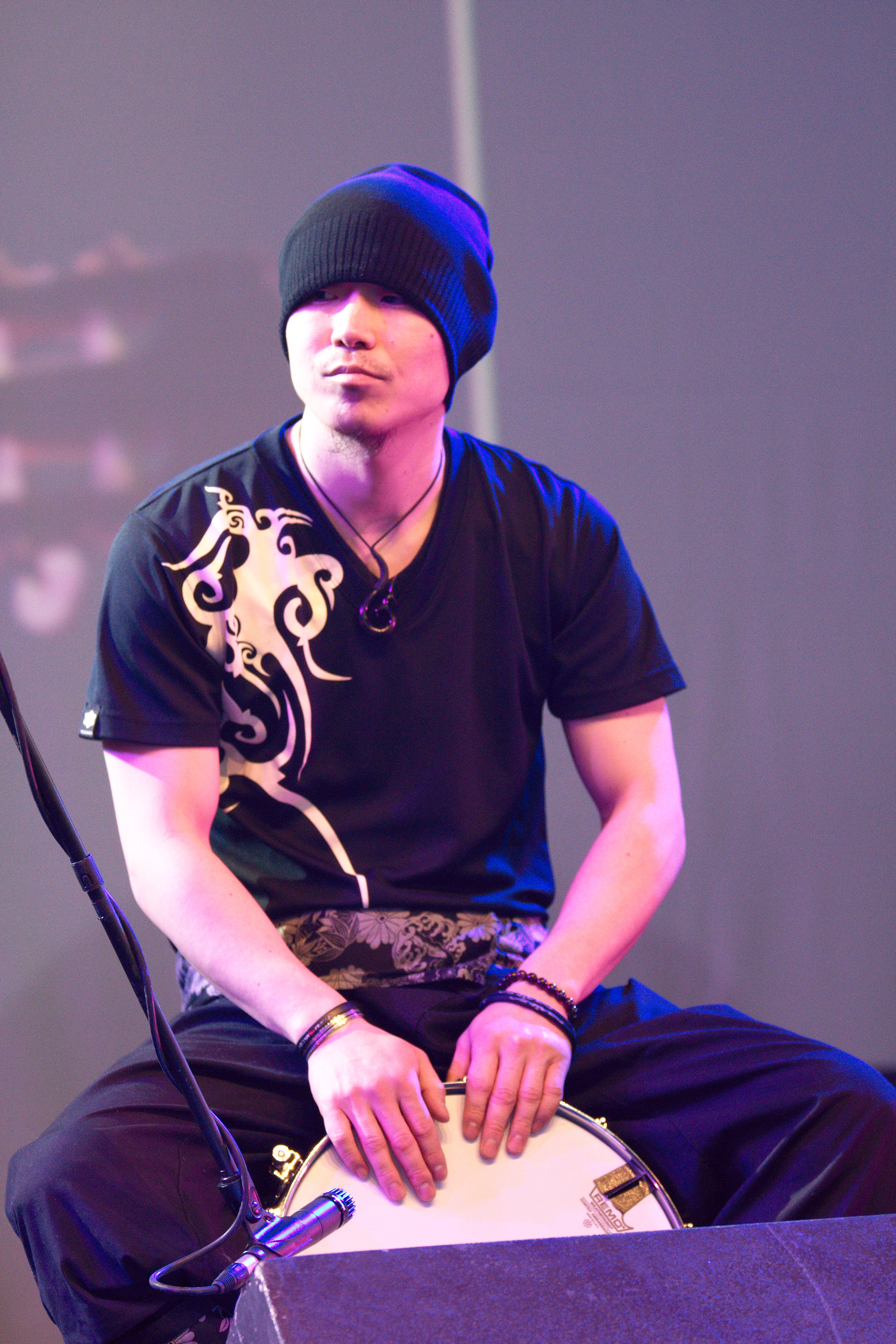
Batch

== Discography ==
=== Studio albums ===
- Vary (April 25, 2003)
- Folie a Deux (December 12, 2007)
- Stand in the World (June 6, 2012) Oricon Albums Chart Peak Position: No. 146
- Disillusion (August 6, 2014) No. 132
- Realize (May 17, 2017) No. 168
- Respawn (July 24, 2019) No. 259
- In the Abyss (July 10, 2024)

=== Other albums ===
- Pobl Lliw (September 3, 2010, self-cover)
- Alteration (November 18, 2015, compilation) No. 239
- Devilize It (March 20, 2018, live)

=== EPs ===
- ID (February 9, 2002)
- Vacancy (November 23, 2005)
- Prodigium (October 7, 2009) No. 294

=== Singles ===
- "Escapism" (December 6, 2000)
- "Crap Head" (May 16, 2001)
- "De Ja Dub" (April 23, 2004)
- "Whiterror" (June 6, 2005)
- "Purge the World" (April 2, 2012, US only)
- "Burn It All Down" (May 29, 2024, digital only)
- "The Moon Chases Me" (June 19, 2024, digital only)

=== DVDs ===
- Toy's Box (August 30, 2006)
- Paralysed Box (October 29, 2008)
- Delirium (July 6, 2011)
- Stand in the World - The Rock Musical Show (December 28, 2016)
- Realize It (April 25, 2018) No. 251
