= Satoshi Kuroda =

Japanese baseball player (born 1975)

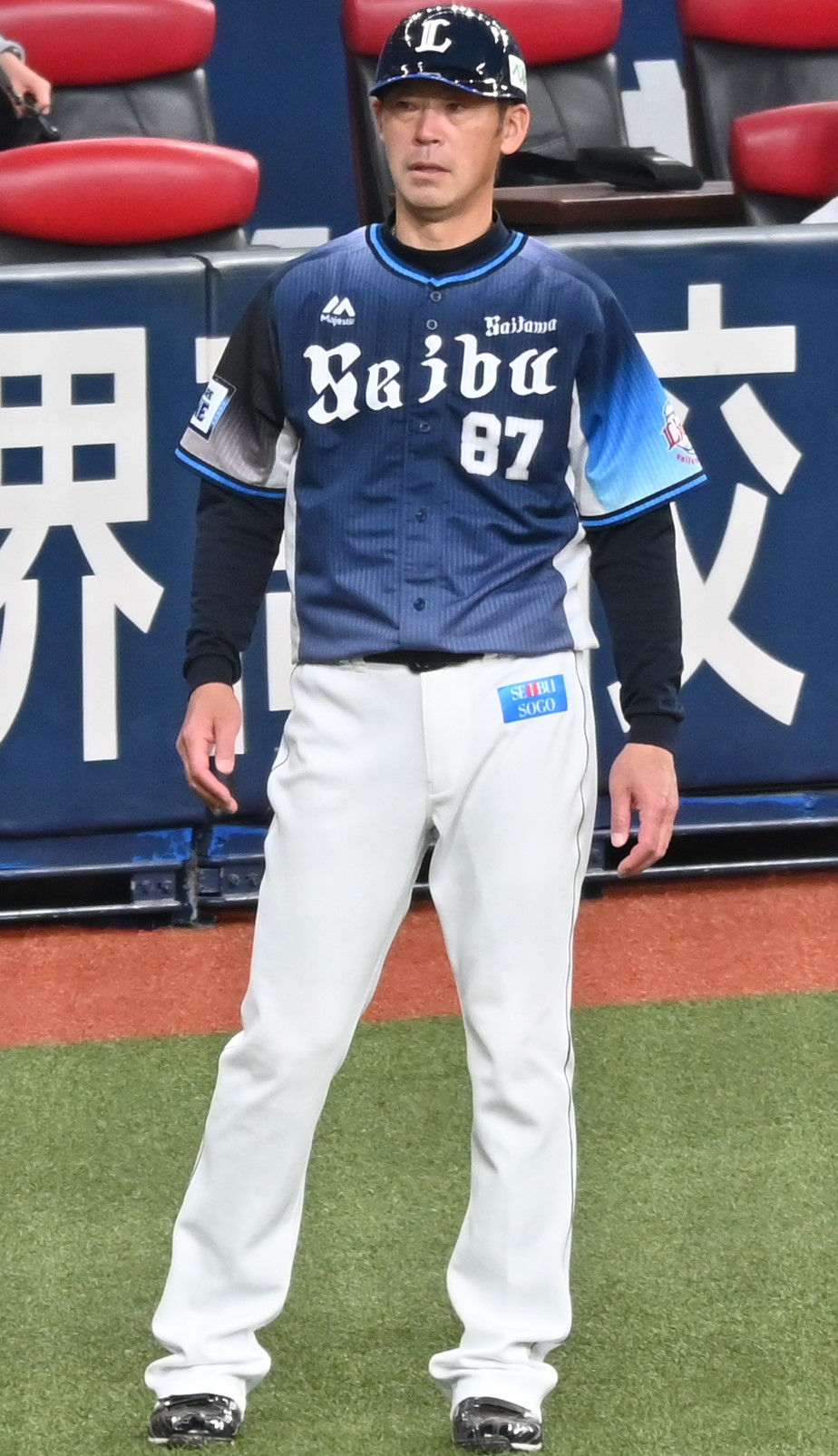

Saitama Seibu Lions – No. 87
- Infielder/Coach
- Born: January 11, 1975 (age 50)
- Batted: Right Threw: Right

NPB debut
- October 6, 1995, for the Seibu Lions

Last NPB appearance
- June 6, 2006, for the Yomiuri Giants

NPB statistics (through 2006)
- Batting average: .195
- Home runs: 6
- RBI: 58

Teams
- As player: Seibu Lions (1993–2001, 2007); Yomiuri Giants (2002–2006); As coach: Saitama Seibu Lions (2009–present)

Satoshi Kuroda (黒田 哲史, Kuroda Satoshi; born January 11, 1975 in Kobe, Hyōgo, Japan) is a former professional Japanese baseball infielder and current coach for the Saitama Seibu Lions in Japan's Nippon Professional Baseball.

He was previously married to Chiharu Niiyama, a Japanese actress.
