= Chiharu Niiyama =

Japanese actress and gravure idol

- 新山千春
- Born: January 14, 1981 (age 45); Aomori, Aomori, Japan
- Occupations: Actress, tarento, model
- Years active: 1995–present
- Agent: Horipro
- Height: 168 cm (5 ft 6 in)
- Spouse: Satoshi Kuroda (m. 2004; div. 2014) Unknown (m. 2023)
- Children: 1
- Website: Official blog

Chiharu Niiyama (新山千春, Nīyama Chiharu; born January 14, 1981) is a Japanese actress, tarento, and former gravure idol. She is affiliated with Horipro.

== Personal life ==
Niiyama was born in Aomori. She was previously married to baseball player Satoshi Kuroda in 2004. Together, they have a daughter named Koharu Niiyama, born on July 12, 2006. They divorced on December 29, 2014.

On November 7, 2023, Niiyama announced her second marriage to a non-celebrity man, who is thirteen years her junior. They have reportedly been in a relationship for five years.

== Filmography ==
=== Film ===
- The 2 Dimensional Travelers (1996)
- Godzilla, Mothra and King Ghidorah: Giant Monsters All-Out Attack - Yuri Tachibana (2001)
- Ju-on: The Grudge 2 - Tomoko Miura (2003)
- Rokushukan Private Moment - Akira Yuki (2001)
- Tokusou Sentai Dekaranger The Movie: Full Blast Action - Marie Gold/Deka Gold (2004)
- Pride - Arimori (2009)
- Keiji Shoot 4 - Honaka (2013)

=== Television ===
- Carnation (2012)
- Ultraman Taiga - Kana Sasaki (2019)
- The Detective is Way Ahead - Sumika Sogawa (2018)

=== Voice Acting ===
==== Video game ====
- Eurasia Express Satsujin Jiken - Yukino Wada (1998)
- Doraemon: Nobita and the Robot Kingdom - Jeanne (2002)
