= Tobira o Akete =

Single by ANZA
- Released: April 21, 1999
- Recorded: 1998 or 1999
- Genre: J-pop
- Label: Victor Entertainment
- Songwriter(s): Kohmi Hirose, Anza Ohyama
- Producer(s): Kikuko; Seiji Kameda

ANZA singles chronology
"Dream" (1998)	"Tobira o Akete" (1999)	"Kanata e" (2006)

Tobira o Akete (扉をあけて, lit. "Open the door") is Anza's second solo single released on April 21, 1999, under the Victor Entertainment label. The single reached #57 on the weekly Oricon chart and only rank for a week. It was used as a second opening song for the NHK anime Cardcaptor Sakura.

== Track list ==
All lyrics are written by Kohmi Hirose and Anza Ohyama

No.	Title	Arrangers	Length
1.	"Tobira o Akete" (扉をあけて)	Seiji Kameda	4:41
2.	"Mienai Chizu" (見えない地図)	Anza Ohyama	4:13
3.	"Tobira o Akete" ((instrumental))	Seiji Kameda	4:41
4.	"Mienai Chizu" ((instrumental))	Anza Ohyama	4:22
