= Psychic Force 2012 =

1998 video game

- North American Dreamcast cover art
- Developer: Taito
- Publisher: Taito: EU: JVC Music Europe (PS1)
- Directors: Hiroshi Aoki; Kōjirō Modeki
- Producer: Takeshi Kamimura
- Designers: Takeshi Kamimura; Kōjirō Modeki
- Programmers: Takafumi Kaneko; Hiroshi Aoki; Tomohiro Hojo
- Artists: Tsutomu Matsuda; Noritaka Kawamoto; Yuji Sakamoto
- Composer: Hideki Takahagi
- Platforms: Arcade, Dreamcast, PlayStation
- Release: Arcade; June 25, 1998; Dreamcast: JP: March 4, 1999; NA: November 9, 1999; EU: September 4, 2000; PlayStation: JP: October 7, 1999; EU: September 19, 2000
- Genre: Fighting
- Modes: Single-player, multiplayer
- Arcade system: Wolf 3-DFX

Psychic Force 2012 (サイキックフォース2012, Saikikku Fōsu 2012) is a 1998 arcade fighting game developed by Taito as the sequel to their 1996 title, Psychic Force. After its arcade release, it was ported a year later to the Dreamcast home console, becoming one of its earliest titles when it was released in Japan on March 4, 1999. A North American version was released on November 9, 1999, and a year later in Europe, both distributed by Acclaim Entertainment but self-published by Taito.

The game was also adapted for the PlayStation and released under the title of Psychic Force 2 (サイキックフォース2, Saikikku Fōsu Tsū) in Japan on October 7, 1999, and in PAL regions on September 19, 2000. This version features downgraded graphics, but includes several extra modes (such as the "Psy-Expand" mode), an animated FMV intro, and three returning characters from the original Psychic Force (Sonia, Brad and Genma) who had been omitted in Psychic Force 2012. In 2006, Psychic Force 2012 was re-released as part of an anniversary pack for the PlayStation 2 titled Psychic Force Complete, which also includes the original Psychic Force and a special exclusive remixed version of 2012 titled Psychic Force 2012 EX.

In 2012 the arcade game returned, with location test for the Taito NESiCAxLive version occurring between November 2 and November 6, 2012.

== Gameplay ==
Psychic Force 2012 is a three-dimensional fighting game in which characters engage in aerial combat within enclosed arenas. Unlike conventional fighting games, players can move freely through the arena, using close-range attacks, psychic projectiles and defensive barriers. Each character has a Life Gauge and a Psycho Gauge, the latter of which is consumed by psychic attacks and defensive techniques. As a character loses health, the capacity of their Psycho Gauge increases.

The combat system includes techniques such as the Quick Dash and Slide Dash for movement, Barrier Guard for defence and Barrier Break for overcoming an opponent's protection. Other mechanics include Psy-Impulse, which allows players to counterattack after being knocked against an arena wall, and Hyper Charge, which sacrifices health to increase offensive power.

The Dreamcast version features several modes of play. Arcade Mode consists of a series of battles against computer-controlled opponents, while Story Mode incorporates fully voiced dialogue and narrative sequences. Training Mode allows players to practise attacks and combinations, while VS Human and VS COM modes provide matches against human and computer-controlled opponents, respectively. Watch Mode allows players to observe computer-controlled battles from different viewpoints. The Dreamcast release also supports configurable controls and the Puru Puru Pack vibration accessory.

== Story ==
Taking place two years after the events of Psychic Force, the sequel finds the world caught in the crossfire between two factions who vie for control over the Earth. Upon returning after his fateful past battle against his old friend Burn Griffiths, Keith Evans resurrects NOA as Neo NOA and once again resumes his conquest of establishing a utopia for united Psychiccers. Richard Wong, who had broken away from NOA, establishes his own group of Psychiccers known as "The Army" and seeks to eliminate Neo NOA in an attempt to conquer the world. As the two groups fight for control over the fate of the Earth, independent Psychiccers who find themselves being drawn into the conflict seek to hunt down members of Neo NOA and The Army in an attempt to find the truth and help locate their missing family and friends.

== Characters ==
=== New ===
Psychic Force 2012 introduced seven characters new to the series. A few have similarity in fighting styles with a few of the previous cast.

- Might: The new lead character of the game. A young Psychiccer boy who has the ability to use the psychic power of lightning in battle. While Might enjoys his job in hunting down and killing Psychiccers as a Psychiccer Hunter, he begins to question why he takes up such an occupation.
- Patricia "Patty" Myers: A young Psychiccer girl who has the ability to use the psychic power of tone in battle. As a close friend of Might, Patty always watches over him and makes sure that he never gets himself into trouble. Aside from that, Patty is also on a personal mission to find and locate her missing mother.
- Carlo Belfrond: A well-suited and intellectual Psychiccer man who has the ability to use the psychic power of water in battle. Carlo, who serves as Keith's new subordinate in Neo NOA, helps supports Keith's dream of a Psychiccer-only utopia and, along with his younger sister Regina, vows to eliminate anyone who gets in the way of Neo NOA.
- Regina Belfrond: A beautiful Psychiccer woman who has the ability to use the psychic power of fire in battle. Much like her older brother Carlo, Regina is also a supporter of Keith's ambition and fights to make it come into reality itself.
- Gudeath: A ruthless Psychiccer man who has the ability to use the psychic power of gravity in battle. Brutal and merciless, Gudeath dislikes people who he deems as being weak, especially the Psychiccers of Neo NOA, and vows to eliminate them and anyone else in order to show off his superior power.
- Setsuna: A cold-hearted Psychiccer man who has the ability to use the psychic power of darkness in battle. While Setsuna serves The Army for the thrill of fighting powerful opponents, he plans on eliminating Wong so that he can take full control over the organization.
- Genshin Kenjoh: A Japanese Yamabushi monk/priest who uses Shugendō magic in battle. Much like Genma from the first game, Genshin is convinced that Psychiccers are evil and he vows to eliminate each and every one of them while attempting to rescue a young Yamabushi named Shiori from Wong and The Army.

=== Returning ===
==== Original ====
Original characters from Psychic Force with the exception of the Psychic Force 2 exclusive characters who are also members of the original cast.

- Burn Griffiths: The main protagonist of the series. Awakened from his frozen slumber for the past two years, Burn is ready and prepared to not only thwart the plans of both Neo NOA and The Army, but also to find and stop Keith so that he can convince him to give up his ambition of creating a Psychiccer-only world once again.
- Emilio Michaelov: Brainwashed by Wong to serve his army.
- Wendy Ryan: Having lost Sonia in the previous game, Wendy now searches for Burn, who mysteriously disappeared, and Emilio.
- Richard Wong: Now head of The Army which is opposing Neo NOA, Wong still plots for world domination.
- Gates Oltsman: Reprogrammed by Keith to serve Neo NOA, Gates is currently fighting for control.
- Keith Evans: The leader of Neo NOA who is still trying to create a utopia for Psychiccers, but at the same time, concerned about his friend, Burn, who he kept in a frozen slumber for the past two years.

==== Psychic Force 2 exclusive ====
Three characters were added to the PlayStation port of Psychic Force 2012, known as Psychic Force 2. They are characters from the original Psychic Force who never made it to the arcade or the Dreamcast version, though they lack a Story Mode.

- Sonia (Chris Ryan)
- Brad Kilsten
- Rokudo Genma

== Development ==
For the Dreamcast conversion of Psychic Force 2012, Taito sought to reproduce the arcade game while adapting its presentation and controls for the home console. In an October 1998 interview, director Hiroshi Aoki and other members of the development team discussed the work involved in bringing the game to Dreamcast hardware.

In a December 1998 interview, Taito's main programmer discussed the technical challenges of converting the arcade game. The magazine described two parallel areas of development: investigating the Dreamcast hardware and implementing features specifically for the console release.

The Dreamcast version included several modes for home play, including Training, VS Human, VS COM and Watch modes, in addition to Arcade and Story modes. It also featured configurable controller settings and support for the Dreamcast's Puru Puru Pack vibration accessory.

== Windows version ==
サイキックフォース2012 サイキックフォース2012復刻版 (rerelease title)
- Publisher: JP: UNBALANCE Corporation
- Series: Psychic Force
- Platform: Windows 98
- Release: JP: 1999-?; (Original version): JP: 2001-11-22; (Re-release version)
- Genres: Action, Fighting
- Modes: Single-player, multiplayer

This version includes features from the Dreamcast port of the game, and Glide/DirectX support.

The re-release version includes only the DirectX version of the game, and added a character gallery.

== Reception ==
In Japan, Game Machine listed Psychic Force 2012 on their August 1, 1998 issue as being the second most-successful arcade game of the month. According to Japanese sales figures from Famitsu compiled by Japan GameCharts, the Dreamcast version sold 32,323 copies during its first week of release and 57,831 copies in Japan by February 2004, ranking 64th among Dreamcast games in the database.

Jeff Lundrigan reviewed the Dreamcast version of the game for Next Generation, rating it one star out of five, and stated that "A waste of money and time."

European critics were divided in their assessments of the Dreamcast version. British magazine Computer & Video Games awarded Psychic Force 2012 four out of five stars, praising its fast-paced aerial combat, special attacks and unconventional fighting mechanics. French magazine Consoles + awarded the game 80%, appreciating its unusual combat system and improved graphical presentation, although the reviewer criticised the lack of significant innovations and additional gameplay modes compared with its predecessor. German magazine MAN!AC gave the game 43%, criticising aspects of its fighting mechanics and the difficulty of escaping repeated attacks.

Italian magazine Mega Console awarded the imported Japanese Dreamcast version 78 out of 100, praising its faithful conversion of the arcade original, particularly the graphical presentation, fluid animation and opponent AI. However, the reviewer felt that the arcade-oriented design limited the game's long-term appeal as a home-console release. Spain's Revista Oficial Dreamcast awarded it 4 out of 10, finding the concept of aerial combat inside a three-dimensional arena interesting but criticising the confusing battles and difficulty of approaching opponents. The magazine considered it inferior to other fighting games available for the Dreamcast.
