= Godzilla Generations =

1998 video game

- Developer: General Entertainment
- Publisher: Sega
- Series: Godzilla
- Platform: Dreamcast
- Release: JP: November 27, 1998
- Genre: Action
- Mode: Single-player

Godzilla Generations (Note: Japanese: ゴジラ ジェネレーションズ, Hepburn: Gojira Jenerēshonzu) is an action game developed by General Entertainment and published by Sega for the Dreamcast in 1998. It was exclusively released in Japan as one of the system's four launch titles. The game is based on the Godzilla franchise and involves the player controlling various giant monsters in an attempt to destroy real-life Japanese cities.

A sequel, Godzilla Generations: Maximum Impact, was released in Japan in 1999.

== Gameplay ==
Godzilla Generations is an action game where the player must control one of five monsters from the Godzilla universe. Initially, only Godzilla and Mechagodzilla can be selected, while the other characters are unlocked by progressing through the game. The game world is composed of five cities, each comprising two stages, except the final city which has three. The object of the game is to proceed to the next stage by destroying everything on the stage within a set time limit, such as buildings and trees. Each character has projectile attacks, the ability to block incoming attacks and the ability to heal themselves.

== Development and release ==
Godzilla Generations was developed by General Entertainment and published by Sega as a launch title for the Dreamcast. It was originally known as simply Godzilla, before its name was changed in July 1998. The game was exclusively released in Japan on November 27, 1998.

== Reception ==
Reception

Review scores
Publication	Score
Computer and Video Games	1/10
Edge	4/10
Famitsu	20/40
GameSpot	3.2/10

Godzilla Generations received lukewarm reviews from Japanese gaming magazine Famitsu and a very negative response from Western journalists, despite fans showing interest in the game at the 1998 Tokyo Game Show. Computer and Video Games reviewer Kim Randell described the game as dull and cited issues such as poor controls, a constantly shifting camera and the player character blocking the player's view. Peter Bartholow of GameSpot derided the game as "terrible" and one of the worst games of 1998. Bartholow found it impossible to block incoming attacks due to the creatures' slow gait. He stated that because of this the developers added a healing ability to each creature, allowing players to continue through the game without fear of their character dying, "There's no strategy, no technique. Just the extreme tedium of tromping through cities." Edge criticized the graphics quality, clumsy controls, and confusing camera system, which was said to make in-game objects difficult for players to locate.

Despite showing interest in a preview, describing the game as looking like "a riot", Jaz Rignall of IGN and his colleagues were less enthusiastic when their first Dreamcast console arrived three months later with three Japanese launch games. He found "while it brought many smiles and jeers, it didn't impress", the gathered journalists quickly lost interest and moved onto another game. In a November 2002 review of Godzilla: Destroy All Monsters Melee, GameSpy's David Hodgson described himself as "still wincing from Godzilla: Generations". He went on to say the game "seemed to adhere to the loony premise that bizarre camera angles, a monster trudging in extreme slow motion, and the knuckle-gnawingly slow chipping away of scenery was the new high watermark in monstrous fighting action. It wasn't. It was crap".

Japan-GameCharts reported that the game sold approximately 22,870 copies.

== Sequel ==
Godzilla Generations: Maximum Impact cover art

Godzilla Generations: Maximum Impact was developed by General Entertainment and published by Sega for the Dreamcast on December 23, 1999, exclusively in Japan. The game is split into levels in which Godzilla is stomping forward through a city while he has to shoot enemies. The player can also make Godzilla duck attacks, by holding or tapping the analog pad. In other levels, Godzilla can walk freely and has to fight in one-on-one against Biollante, King Ghidorah, Mothra, the new robot bosses SMG-IInd and MGR-IInd, SpaceGodzilla, the Super X-III which is the game's smallest boss and the last boss, Destoroyah. Godzilla is the only playable character in the game. He can shoot heat rays at his enemies. IGN gave the game 2.5 out of 10 in their review.
