= Moonlight Densetsu =

Single by Dali

Single by Dali

from the album Bishōjo Senshi Sailormoon: Ai wa Doko ni Aru no?
- B-side: "Heart Moving"
- Released: March 21, 1992
- Genre: J-pop; anime song
- Length: 2:54
- Label: Nippon Columbia
- Composer: Tetsuya Komoro
- Lyricist: Kanako Oda

"Moonlight Densetsu"

Song by Moonlips

from the album "'Rashiku' Ikimasho"
- Released: July 21, 1995
- Genre: J-pop
- Label: Nippon Columbia (8 cm single, CODC-8995)
- Songwriters: Kanako Oda; Haruo Chikada

"'Rashiku' Ikimasho" track listing
- 1. "'Rashiku' Ikimasho"; 2. "Moonlight Densetsu"

"Moonlight Densetsu / Otome no Policy"

Single by Dali and Yoko Ishida
- Released: June 21, 2000
- Genre: J-pop
- Label: Nippon Columbia

"Moonlight Densetsu" (Japanese: ムーンライト伝説, Hepburn: Mūnraito Densetsu; lit. "Moonlight Legend") is a song that served as an opening theme for the anime series Sailor Moon.

The song's original version was released in Japan on March 21, 1992, on a split single by Dali and Misae Takamatsu titled "Moonlight Densetsu / Heart Moving" (ムーンライト伝説/HEART MOVING). The Dali recording of "Moonlight Densetsu" served as the opening theme for the first two seasons of Sailor Moon's anime adaptation. Another version of "Moonlight Densetsu" by Moon Lips was the opening theme of the next two Sailor Moon anime seasons. The Moon Lips version was used as the ending theme for the series finale of Sailor Moon.

The English dubbed Sailor Moon broadcast in North America by DIC Entertainment adopted an English cover version with rewritten lyrics.

== Reception ==
The song "Moonlight Densetsu" was a big hit in Japan. In 1995, the original 1992 single by Dali et al. was certified Gold by the Recording Industry Association of Japan. An online survey conducted in 2008 by Goo recognized it as the most popular song from an anime series for karaoke from 1991 to 2000. "Moonlight Densetsu" won first place in the Song category in Animage's 15th and 16th Anime Grand Prix. It came seventh in the 17th Grand Prix. According to a poll conducted by Japanese music magazine CD&DL Data in 2016 about the most representative songs associated with the moon, the original version by Dali was ranked 4th by 6203 respondents aging from teens to thirties. In 2019, the original Dali version won the Performance Award of the Heisei Anisong Grand Prize among the anime theme songs from 1989 to 1999. "Moonlight Densetsu" was ranked 12th in Onegai! Ranking Series' derivative variety show "130,000 People Vote! Anime Song General Election" broadcast by TV Asahi on September 6, 2020.

Due to the high similarity of its melody to the song "Sayonara wa dansu no ato ni" (lit. "Goodbye After the Dance", composed by Hirooki Ogawa, lyrics by Hiroshi Yokoi), the composer, Ogawa, negotiated through JASRAC and reached a settlement under the condition that he would receive a certain amount of money.

== Track listings ==
1992 single (Columbia CODC-8995)

"Moonlight Densetsu / Heart Moving" (ムーンライト伝説 / HEART MOVING; "Moonlight Legend / Heart Moving...") is a split single by Dali and Misae Takamatsu. It was released in Japan on March 21, 1992.

1. "Moonlight Densetsu" (ムーンライト伝説) — Dali (DALI)
2. "Heart Moving" (HEART MOVING) — Misae Takamatsu (高松美砂絵)
3. "Moonlight Densetsu" (Original Karaoke)
4. "Heart Moving" (Original Karaoke)

1995 single (Columbia CODC-8995)

"Moonlight Densetsu / Rashiku "Ikimasho"" (ムーンライト伝説 / らしく"いきましょ"; "Moonlight Legend / Let's be like") is a single by Moonlips and Meu. It was released in Japan on July 21, 1995. The single was used for the Sailor Moon S and Sailor Moon Super S, respectively.

1. "Moonlight Densetsu" (ムーンライト伝説) — MoonLips
2. "Rashiku Ikimasho" (らしく"いきましょ) — Meu
3. "Moonlight Densetsu" (Original Karaoke)
4. "Rashiku Ikimasho" (Original Karaoke)

2000 single (Columbia CODC-1873)

"Moonlight Densetsu / Otome no Policy" (ムーンライト伝説 / 乙女のポリシー; "Moonlight Legend / Maiden's Policy") is a split single by Dali and Yoko Ishida. It was released in Japan on June 21, 2000. The second track, "Otome no Policy", had been used to end Sailor Moon R and Sailor Moon S.

1. "Moonlight Densetsu" (ムーンライト伝説) — Dali (DALI)
2. "Otome no Policy" (乙女のポリシー) — Yoko Ishida (石田燿子)
3. "Moonlight Densetsu" (Original Karaoke)
4. "Otome no Policy" (Original Karaoke)

== Other versions ==
- Japanese idol girl group Momoiro Clover Z provided their version of the song for the Sailor Moon 20th Anniversary Memorial Tribute album in 2014.
  - The group re-sung their version of the song with current members (subtitled "ZZ ver.") for the "Moon Color Chainon" (月色Chainon, Tsukiiro Chainon) single album in 2021.
- A French language cover version, translated and performed by the Japan-based French singer Clémentine, was included in the 20th Anniversary Memorial Tribute album as a bonus track in 2014.
- J-pop singer LiSA provided her version of the song for Sailor Moon 25th Anniversary Memorial Tribute album in 2018.
- The voice actresses of Inner Sailor Guardians from Sailor Moon Crystal series: Kotono Mitsuishi (as Sailor Moon), Hisako Kanemoto (as Sailor Mercury), Rina Satō (as Sailor Mars), Ami Koshimizu (as Sailor Jupiter), and Shizuka Itō (as Sailor Venus), provided their version of the song for the 25th Anniversary Memorial Tribute album in 2018 as a bonus track.
  - The voice actresses provided a different version of the song for the opening theme of the first film of the Sailor Moon Cosmos two-part film in 2023.
