= Erika Yamakawa =

Japanese model

- Born: 7 March 1982 (age 44); Morioka, Iwate, Japan
- Years active: 1999-present
- Modeling information
- Agency: Avant-gardes
- Website: http://www.dhcblog.com/yamakawa/

Erika Yamakawa (山川 恵里佳, Yamakawa Erika; born 7 March 1982) is a fashion model from Japan. She is from Iwate. She appeared in the show-business production Avant-gardes. She was a gravure idol.

== Career ==
She won Miss Young Magazine in 1998, then became a model. At present, she mainly appears on TV variety programs. In February 2007, she married Japanese comedian Monkikki. On March 11, 2010, she had her first child.

Yamakawa will star in the 2016 rock musical Stand in the World, based on the music of Head Phones President.

== Activities ==
=== TV Programs ===
- Human Variety Nichiyo no Magellan (ヒューマンバラエティ 日曜のマゼラン), Higashinippon Broadcasting
- S Para (Sパラ), Television Kanagawa
- Kiseki Taiken Unbelievable (奇跡体験!アンビリバボー), Fuji Television
- Heroine Tanjo (ヒロイン誕生), TV Osaka
- Urinari Geinojin Shako Dance Bu (ウリナリ芸能人社交ダンス部), Nippon Television
- Tensai Terebikun Wide (天才てれびくんワイド), 2001–03
- Tensai Terebikun MAX (天才てれびくんMAX), 2003–04
- Tokyo Niwa-tsuki Ikkodate (東京庭付き一戸建て), Nippon Television 2002
- Indies Wars (インディーウォーズ), Nippon Television 2004

=== Radio Program ===
- ERIKA'S BAY NIGHT CRUISIN, bayfm

== Stage Dramas ==
- Heidi, 2002
- Anne of Green Gables, 2003–04

== Other appearances ==
- Ø Story (2000)
- Dramatic Dream Team (2003), a comedy pro wrestling promotion, where she wins the Ironman Heavymetalweight Championship once

== Bibliography ==
=== Photo books ===
1. Yosei (妖精 / A Fairy), Bunkasha 1999
2. OK Baby, Wani Books 2000
3. Hidamari to Bidama (陽だまりとビー玉 / A Place in the Sun and Marbles), Saibunkan 2000
