= Kiri no Hi =

- Genre: Drama
- Written by: Yō Takeyama
- Directed by: Nozomu Amamiya
- Starring: Karina Nose; Etsuko Ichihara; Miho Shiraishi; Yui Ichikawa; Risa Kudō; Osamu Mukai
- Theme music composer: Takeshi Umōda
- Country of origin: Japan
- Original language: Japanese

Production
- Running time: 138 minutes

Original release
- Network: Nippon Television
- Release: August 25, 2008

Kiri no Hi (霧の火) is a Japanese television drama which originally aired on Nippon Television (NTV) on August 25, 2008. Directed by Nozomu Amamiya and with a screenplay by Yō Takeyama, it starred Etsuko Ichihara and Karina Nose. The production won a TV Drama Award at the 2008 Festival of the Arts of the Japanese Agency for Cultural Affairs (文化庁芸術祭).

== Plot ==
The story takes place in Maoka City, Karafuto, Japan (Currently Kholmsk, Sakhalin, Russian Federation) during the final year of the Pacific War. Nine telephone operators in Maoka took their own lives by taking potassium cyanide when the Soviet Union invaded the city on August 20, 1945. The TV drama is based on this incident and is partially fictional (names of the characters, etc.).

== Cast ==
- Etsuko Ichihara as Nakamura Mizue (age 82)
  - Mayuko Fukuda as Mizue (age 15-19)
- Karina Nose as Inoue Aiko
- Miho Shiraishi as Misa Yamazaki
- Yui Ichikawa as Nakajima Sakura
- Risa Kudō as Yoshiko Inoue
- Osamu Mukai
- Nakamura Shidō
- Hitomi Satō
- Tkachov Sava as Andrei.
- Ayaka Ikezawa as Akane Kawashima
- Asuka Shibuya
- Natsuko as Tiyo Sato
- Yūko Natori
- Ayumi Sakamoto

== Background ==
The Soviet Union's occupation of Karafuto is a very sensitive topic and controversial in both Russia and Japan due to the previous border dispute between the two countries. A 1974 movie titled Karafuto 1945 Summer Hyosetsu no Mon (樺太1945年夏 氷雪の門) portrayed the event as an invasion by the Red Army that claimed the lives of thousands. However, due to political pressure from the Soviet Union, the Japanese government intervened and banned the movie from being aired and sold.

Kiri no Hi caused less political uproar from Russia due to the movie's insistence as "fiction" and it did not focus on the Red Army's brutal actions but instead talked about world peace. At the end, the granddaughter of the survivor of the Soviet offensive pointed at Sakhalin and said, "Grandma, look, it's Sakhalin", with a big smile, instead of calling the island by its Japanese name of Karafuto, which hinted that the Japanese people were to move on from the past and go forward despite their conflict with the Russians.
