= Pretty Soldier Sailor Moon S (3DO game) =

1995 video game

- Developer: Tose
- Publisher: Bandai
- Series: Sailor Moon
- Platform: 3DO Interactive Multiplayer
- Release: JP: 17 March 1995
- Genre: Fighting
- Modes: Single-player, multiplayer

Pretty Soldier Sailor Moon S (Note: Japanese: 美少女 戦士 セーラー ムーン S, Hepburn: Bishōjo Senshi Sērā Mūn S) is a fighting game developed by Tose and published by Bandai exclusively for the 3DO Interactive Multiplayer in Japan on 17 March 1995. It is based upon Naoko Takeuchi's Sailor Moon shōjo manga and anime series, though its gameplay has been compared with other titles in the same genre such as SNK's Samurai Shodown. Loosely following the third season of the anime series, which adapted the third arc of the manga, the players control either one of the five original Inner Senshi or one of the three Outer Senshi as they enter a tournament to fight against each other and become the winning victor. Takeuchi supervised the production of the project and seiyūs from the anime series returned to reprise their roles.

Despite being exclusive to Japan, Pretty Soldier Sailor Moon S garnered negative reception from critics who reviewed it as an import title since its release and although it was commended for the presentation, the animation and controls were heavily criticized.

== Gameplay ==
Gameplay screenshot showcasing a match between Sailor Moon and Sailor Mercury.

As with the previously released Bishōjo Senshi Sailor Moon S: Jōgai Rantō!? Shuyaku Sōdatsusen on Super Famicom, Pretty Soldier Sailor Moon S is a fighting game similar to Street Fighter II: The World Warrior in which the player fights against other opponents in one-on-one matches and the fighter who manages to deplete the health bar of the opponent wins the first bout and the first to win two bouts becomes the winner of the match. Each round is timed, which can be adjusted or deactivated at the options menu screen and if both fighters still have health remaining when time is over, the one with more health wins that round. The game features various game modes and settings that can be selected on the menu screen.

In the single-player mode, players can choose from nine playable Sailor Soldiers and fight against computer-controlled fighters across several locations from the series, although Sailor Saturn is not present in this title. Each of these Soldiers has their own special attack set, as well as their own special moves that can be performed by inputting a combination of directional and button-based commands. An easy difficulty mode allows players to execute special attacks with simple button presses while a normal mode requires more complex input combinations. Similar to the Samurai Shodown franchise, the camera zooms in or out to maximize or minimize the level of graphical detail depending on character movement.

== Development and release ==
Pretty Soldier Sailor Moon S was developed by Tose for the 3DO Interactive Multiplayer and several people were involved in its creation. Sailor Moon author Naoko Takeuchi was involved during the production as supervisor and seiyūs from the anime series returned to reprise their respective roles. The game was released for the 3DO exclusively in Japan by Bandai on 17 March 1995. Early previews prior to release showcased minimal differences compared to the final version.

== Reception and legacy ==
Reception

Review scores
Publication	Score
Next Generation	2/5
Player One	25%

According to Famitsu, Pretty Soldier Sailor Moon S on 3DO sold over 11,005 copies in its first week on the market. The game sold approximately 19,075 copies during its lifetime in Japan. Next Generation reviewed the game, rating it two stars out of five, and stated that "While the premise is interesting, the animation is stilted, and the controls aren't as smooth as they could be. Overall, this game is of interest to fighting game collectors only." Christophe Delpierre of French magazine Player One reviewed the game and gave a score of 25%. However, Spanish magazine GamesTech regarded the title as the best fighting game in the Sailor Moon franchise. Argentinian website Malditos Nerds ranked it as number four on their top Sailor Moon games. Will Matthews of Retro Gamer counted it among the "excellent 2D fighting games" available for the 3DO during its life which also included Super Street Fighter II Turbo and Samurai Shodown.
