= Sailor Moon S =

Third season of the Sailor Moon anime series

- Season 3
- The Japanese logo for the third season, originally translating to Pretty Soldier Sailor Moon S
- No. of episodes: 38

Release
- Original network: TV Asahi
- Original release: March 19, 1994 – February 25, 1995

Season chronology
- ← Previous; Sailor Moon R Next → Sailor Moon SuperS

The third season of the Sailor Moon anime series, Sailor Moon S, (Note: Originally released in Japan as Pretty Soldier Sailor Moon S (美少女戦士セーラームーン S(スーパー), Bishōjo Senshi Sērā Mūn Sūpā), and later as Pretty Guardian Sailor Moon S.) was produced by Toei Animation and directed by Kunihiko Ikuhara. It premiered on TV Asahi on March 19, 1994, and ended on February 25, 1995, lasting 38 episodes. Toei later released the season on DVD in seven compilations between January and April 2005, and in two remastered box sets released on April 21 and July 21, 2010.

The season adapts the "Infinity" arc of the Sailor Moon manga series by Naoko Takeuchi, following Usagi Tsukino and her fellow Sailor Guardians as they fight the alien Death Busters, who plan on taking over Earth. While Sailor Moon S begins similarly to the first two seasons, its tone grows darker and more emotional as the story progresses. The season's popularity with audiences was assessed in a 1995 Animage poll of favorite episodes: "The Death of Uranus and Neptune: The Talismans Appear" came in first place, "The Bond of Destiny: Uranus' Distant Past" came in eighth, and "The Labyrinth of Water: Ami Targeted" came in ninth place. The following year, "A Bright Shooting Star! Saturn, and the Messiah" came in fifteenth place.

In 2000, Cloverway Inc. licensed the season for an English-language broadcast in North America. Optimum Productions resumed dubbing services from the first two seasons licensed by DIC Entertainment and The Program Exchange, though Cloverway retained the original Japanese music and sound effects. The English dub aired on YTV in Canada from June 12 to August 1, 2000, with the episode numbers adjusted to match the original Japanese order, and on Cartoon Network's Toonami programming block in the United States. Pioneer Entertainment released edited and unedited versions of the dub on home video. In 2014, Viz Media licensed Sailor Moon for an updated English release produced by Studiopolis. Their re-dub of Sailor Moon S was released in two volumes on DVD and Blu-ray: the first 19 episodes on November 15, 2016, and the remaining 19 episodes on June 20, 2017.

Three pieces of theme music were used: one opening theme and two ending themes. The opening theme, an updated version of "Moonlight Densetsu" is performed by Moon Lips. The first ending theme, used for the first two episodes, is "Otome no Policy" performed by Yoko Ishida. The second ending theme, used for the remainder of the season, is "Tuxedo Mirage" performed by Peach Hips, a group consisting of voice actresses Kotono Mitsuishi, Michie Tomizawa, Aya Hisakawa, Emi Shinohara and Rika Fukami. Cloverway used the English-language version of "Moonlight Densetsu" from DIC's dub of the first season and Sailor Moon R.

== Censorship ==
Sailor Moon S introduces Sailor Uranus and Sailor Neptune to the cast, who are implicitly depicted as being in a lesbian relationship. Though their romance is never directly addressed, Naoko Takeuchi has stated that they are a romantic couple, and their voice actresses were instructed to play the characters "as if they are a married romantic couple." However, because of differing cultural standards, most countries outside Japan have censored the relationship, excluding Greece, Germany, Spain, and Mexico. In the Cloverway English dub, Neptune and Uranus were instead portrayed as biological cousins. The Viz English dub preserves the subtext of the original material.

== Episodes ==
No. overall	No. in season	Cloverway title Original Japanese and Viz titles	Directed by	Written by	Art director(s)	Animation director(s)	Original release date	English air date
90	1	"Star Struck, Bad Luck" "Premonition of the Apocalypse: The Mysterious New Guardians Appear"; Transliteration: "Chikyū hōkai no yokan? Nazo no shin Senshi shutsugen" (Japanese: 地球崩壊の予感?謎の新戦士出現)	Junichi Sato	Sukehiro Tomita	Kenichi Tajiri	Masahiro Andō	March 19, 1994	June 12, 2000
After experiencing apocalyptic visions, Rei Hino is attacked by a powerful monster called a Daimon that Sailor Moon is unable to fight after it disables her brooch, reversing her transformation. The Daimon is defeated by a pair of mysterious new warriors, leaving the girls to despondently realize that a new conflict has begun.
91	2	"Crystal Clear Again" "The Rod of Love is Born: Usagi's New Transformation"; Transliteration: "Ai no roddo tanjō! Usagi no shin henshin" (Japanese: 愛のロッド誕生!うさぎの新変身)	Yūji Endō	Shigeru Yanagawa	Yoshiyuki Shikano	Katsumi Tamegai	March 26, 1994	June 13, 2000
While Mamoru Chiba strives to cheer Usagi up after her failure in the previous battle, a young girl is the latest target of Kaolinite of the Death Busters. Due to Usagi's inability to transform, the under-powered Sailor Team struggles to fight off the Daimon and are once again forced to rely on the mysterious two warriors. Once they determine the girl's pure heart is not a Talisman, they leave the Sailor Team to fend for themselves. Meanwhile, Tuxedo Mask and Usagi hold hands after the latter's refusal to escape, and through the power of their love, Usagi's disabled Crystal Star brooch transforms into the Cosmic Heart Compact, and she gains the Spiral Heart Moon Rod and, along with it, the ability to transform into Sailor Moon and defeat the Daimon with a "Moon Spiral Heart Attack".
92	3	"Driving Dangerously" "A Handsome Boy? Haruka Tenoh's Secret"; Transliteration: "Suteki na bishōnen? Ten'ō Haruka no himitsu" (Japanese: 素敵な美少年?天王はるかの秘密)	Kunihiko Ikuhara	Katsuyuki Sumisawa	Kazuhisa Asai	Hisashi Kagawa	April 16, 1994	June 14, 2000
Avoiding their study group, Usagi and Minako meet Haruka Tenoh, an attractive and supposedly male student of a prestigious local school, with whom they both become infatuated. After Minako is defeated in a racing game, a girl named Michiru Kaioh arrives to pick up Haruka, and the two depart with Usagi and Minako soon following behind them. Once Michiru and Haruka separate at a mechanic's shop, Usagi and Minako take this as their chance, and Haruka tells them about "him"-self until a Daimon arrives to attack Kameda, the shop mechanic. The Daimon starts to escape when Usagi and Minako transform into their Guardian forms to chase it down, when the two mysterious warriors, revealed to be Sailor Uranus and Sailor Neptune, arrive to investigate Kameda's pure heart crystal. When it turns out not to be a Talisman, they retreat and Sailor Moon defeats the Daimon. Later, the rest of the girls are at Crown Game Center with Usagi and Minako in hopes of seeing the cute boy they have told them about; Michiru arrives with a blonde girl, whom Usagi and Minako initially fail to realize is Haruka; once they do, Minako falls to the ground in anguish, and Haruka notes that she had never said she was male.
93	4	"Bad Harmony" "Usagi's Idol: The Graceful Genius Michiru"; Transliteration: "Usagi no akogare! Yūbi no tensai Michiru" (Japanese: うさぎの憧れ!優美な天才みちる)	Hiroki Shibata	Megumi Sugihara	Kazuyuki Hashimoto	Taichi Nakamura	April 23, 1994	June 15, 2000
When Usagi is concerned that she is not smart enough to be with Mamoru after being scolded by the other girls, she seeks advice from Michiru, who suggests that Usagi and Mamoru go to a violin recital.
94	5	"Swept Off Her Feet" "Protect the Pure Heart: The Three-Way Battle"; Transliteration: "Pyua na kokoro wo mamore! Teki mikata mittsu tomoe ransen" (Japanese: 純な心を守れ!敵味方三つ巴乱戦)	Noriyo Sasaki	Sukehiro Tomita	Kenichi Tajiri	Ikuko Itō	April 30, 1994	June 16, 2000
Usagi's friend, Unazuki Furuhata, is attacked by a Daimon and has her pure heart crystal stolen. When Sailor Moon tries to take the crystal back to Unazuki, Sailor Uranus and Sailor Neptune attempt to steal it in order to claim the Talisman.
95	6	"Blinded By Love's Light" "Let Moon Help with Your Love Problems"; Transliteration: "Koi no otasuke wa Mūn ni omakase" (Japanese: 恋のおたすけはムーンにおまかせ)	Harume Kosaka	Shigeru Yanagawa	Yoshiyuki Shikano	Mari Tominaga	May 7, 1994	June 19, 2000
Naru Osaka and Gurio Umino enter an affection contest in order to prove their strong mutual romantic love for each other, but find themselves targeted by a Daimon.
96	7	"Lita Borrows Trouble" "Coldhearted Uranus: Makoto in Danger"; Transliteration: "Reikoku na Uranusu? Makoto no pinchi" (Japanese: 冷酷なウラヌス?まことのピンチ)	Kōnosuke Uda	Yoji Enokido	Kazuhisa Asai	Masahiro Andō	May 14, 1994	June 20, 2000
Makoto Kino is targeted by a Daimon, but manages to temporarily evade it. Keen to analyze her pure heart crystal, Haruka befriends Makoto in order to get close to her.
97	8	"Damp Spirits" "The Labyrinth of Water: Ami Targeted"; Transliteration: "Mizu no rabirinsu! Nerawareta Ami" (Japanese: 水のラビリンス!ねらわれた亜美)	Junichi Sato	Megumi Sugihara	Kazuyuki Hashimoto	Katsumi Tamegai	May 21, 1994	June 21, 2000
Ami Mizuno's desire to avoid competition leads her to offending Michiru inadvertently in a swimming race, as well as Usagi accidentally hurting Ami's feelings. Meanwhile, a Daimon selects Ami as a target.
98	9	"Friendly Foes" "To Save Our Friends: Moon and Uranus Join Forces"; Transliteration: "Tomodachi wo sukue! Mūn Uranusu rengō" (Japanese: 友達を救え!ムーンウラヌス連合)	Yūji Endō	Sukehiro Tomita	Kenichi Tajiri	Taichi Nakamura	May 28, 1994	June 22, 2000
After Sailor Neptune is captured and possibly killed by Kaolinite, Sailor Moon and Sailor Uranus find themselves shackled together and forced to reassess their less-than-friendly attitudes toward each other in order to save Sailor Neptune from further harm.
99	10	"Mixed Emotions" "A Man's Kindness: Yuichiro, Heartbroken by Rei"; Transliteration: "Otoko no yasashisa! Yūichirō, Rei ni shitsuren?" (Japanese: 男の優しさ!雄一郎, レイに失恋?)	Harume Kosaka	Megumi Sugihara	Yoshiyuki Shikano	Shinya Hasegawa	June 18, 1994	June 23, 2000
Worried by Rei's intensive meditation, Yuichiro Kumada becomes concerned that she has fallen deeply head-over-heels in love for another man. When he sees her with Haruka and mistakes her for a man, Yuichiro is convinced that "he" is Rei's new romantic suitor.
100	11	"Individual Happiness" "I Want to Quit Being a Sailor Guardian: Minako's Dilemma"; Transliteration: "Sērā Senshi wo yametai!? Minako no nayami" (Japanese: S戦士を辞めたい!?美奈子の悩み)	Hiroki Shibata	Yoji Enokido	Kazuhisa Asai	Mari Tominaga	June 25, 1994	June 26, 2000
Minako is despondent about her double life of being a Sailor Guardian and a regular girl. Meanwhile, an old friend of hers, whom she once fell in love with, is attacked by a Daimon, and Minako, as Sailor Venus, must use her volleyball skills to save him.
101	12	"Birthday Blues, Part 1" "Usagi in Tears: A Glass Slipper for My Birthday"; Transliteration: "Usagi namida! Tanjōbi ni garasu no kutsu wo" (Japanese: うさぎ涙!誕生日にガラスの靴を)	Yūji Endō	Katsuyuki Sumisawa	Kazuyuki Hashimoto	Masahiro Andō	July 2, 1994	June 27, 2000
Usagi is furious when Mamoru forgets her 15th birthday. When Mamoru buys her an expensive pair of glass slippers to make up for it, he fails to realize that Kaolinite sabotaged the shoes with a Daimon egg to steal her pure heart crystal. To make matters worse, Kaolinite steals Usagi's Cosmic Heart Compact leaving her unable to transform, and Tuxedo Mask gets captured.
102	13	"Birthday Blues, Part 2" "The Stolen Pure Heart: Usagi's Crisis"; Transliteration: "Ubawareta pyua na kokoro! Usagi zettai zetsumei" (Japanese: 奪われた純な心!うさぎ絶体絶命)	Noriyo Sasaki	Katsuyuki Sumisawa	Kenichi Tajiri	Taichi Nakamura	July 16, 1994	June 28, 2000
With Usagi's brooch stolen and Tuxedo Mask kidnapped, Usagi goes to the Tokyo Tower to rescue Tuxedo Mask and retrieve the brooch so she can become Sailor Moon again, during which the Sailor Guardians face Kaolinite in a final showdown.
103	14	"Hello, Sailor Mini Moon" "The Arrival of a Tiny Pretty Guardian"; Transliteration: "Yatte kita chiccha na Bishōjo Senshi" (Japanese: やって来たちっちゃな美少女戦士)	Kunihiko Ikuhara	Shigeru Yanagawa	Yoshiyuki Shikano	Kazuya Kuroda	August 6, 1994	June 29, 2000
Eudial of the Witches 5 is tasked to take over from Kaolinite's position, in which she targets a genius drummer recruited to play at a festival for Rei. The Sailor Guardians cannot defeat the Daimon who attacks her, but Chibiusa arrives as the Guardians' newest ally, Sailor Chibi Moon.
104	15	"Tainted Tea Party" "Making New Friends: Chibi Moon's Adventure"; Transliteration: "Tomodachi wo motomete! Chibi Mūn no katsuyaku" (Japanese: 友達を求めて!ちびムーンの活躍)	Junichi Sato	Megumi Sugihara	Kazuhisa Asai	Ikuko Itō	August 20, 1994	June 30, 2000
Chibiusa, who has returned from Crystal Tokyo for further training, attempts to adapt to her new home by making friends her age. She tries to befriend a master who performs tea ceremonies, only to become the Death Busters' latest target.
105	16	"People Who Need People" "I Want Power: Mako Lost in Doubt"; Transliteration: "Pawā ga hoshī! Mako-chan no mayoi michi" (Japanese: 力が欲しい!まこちゃんの迷い道)	Hiroki Shibata	Shigeru Yanagawa	Yoshiyuki Shikano	Mari Tominaga	August 27, 1994	July 3, 2000
Makoto is training in the mountains, trying to become much stronger after being easily defeated by a Daimon before. Her trainer is attacked, and tells her that nobody can live alone. She attacks the Daimon, fails, and realizes she needs her best friends in order to win.
106	17	"Related By Destiny" "The Bond of Destiny: Uranus' Distant Past"; Transliteration: "Unmei no kizuna! Uranusu no tōi hi" (Japanese: 運命のきずな!ウラヌスの遠い日)	Takuya Igarashi	Yoji Enokido	Kenichi Tajiri	Katsumi Tamegai	September 3, 1994	July 4, 2000
Haruka remembers the past when she first met Michiru, who told her that she was destined to become Sailor Uranus. Haruka initially refused that destiny, for she loved her life too much and was afraid of change. Haruka was attacked, and Sailor Neptune was injured while defending her. In her anguish, Haruka took the Transformation Lip Rod and accepted her destiny as Sailor Uranus, the Sailor Guardian of the Sky.
107	18	"Art Appreciation" "Art is an Explosion of Love: Chibiusa's First Love"; Transliteration: "Geijutsu wa ai no bakuhatsu! Chibiusa no hatsukoi" (Japanese: 芸術は愛の爆発!ちびうさの初恋)	Yūji Endō	Katsuyuki Sumisawa	Minoru Ōkōchi	Taichi Nakamura	September 10, 1994	July 5, 2000
Chibiusa meets a boy named Masanori at her art class and develops a crush on him. However, he already has a crush on Michiru, who is taking a class at that school as well. When a Daimon attacks Masanori, Chibiusa must take a stand to protect him.
108	19	"Everything's Coming Up Rosey" "Usagi Dancing to the Waltz"; Transliteration: "Usagi no dansu wa warutsu ni notte" (Japanese: うさぎのダンスはワルツに乗って)	Harume Kosaka	Megumi Sugihara	Kazuhisa Asai	Masahiro Andō	September 17, 1994	July 6, 2000
An English gentleman named Edwards invites Mamoru and the girls to a lavish party, where Usagi accidentally becomes drunk and the team is forced to confront a fashionable Eudial and her latest Daimon.
109	20	"No Turning Back" "The Shocking Moment: Everyone's Identities Revealed"; Transliteration: "Shōgeki no toki! Akasareta tagai no shōtai" (Japanese: 衝撃の刻!明かされた互いの正体)	Junichi Sato	Sukehiro Tomita	Yoshiyuki Shikano	Kazuya Kuroda	September 24, 1994	July 7, 2000
Minako becomes jealous that a Daimon has not yet attacked her, and she fears that she does not have a pure heart. After doing as many "pure" things as she can, such as donating blood, she is attacked, and her pure heart is taken from her. When Eudial nearly gets away, Usagi is forced to reveal her identity to Haruka and Michiru, who in turn, reveal their identities as Sailor Uranus and Sailor Neptune to Sailor Moon.
110	21	"Destiny's Arrival" "The Death of Uranus and Neptune: The Talismans Appear"; Transliteration: "Uranusu-tachi no shi? Tarisuman shutsugen" (Japanese: ウラヌス達の死?タリスマン出現)	Kunihiko Ikuhara	Yoji Enokido	Kenichi Tajiri	Mari Tominaga	October 15, 1994	July 10, 2000
Faced with losing her position at Witches 5, Eudial creates a computer program to find the true owners of the three Talismans, and learns that Haruka and Michiru are the ones who hold two of the Talismans within their own hearts. Haruka and Michiru take away Usagi's brooch, the Cosmic Heart Compact, and follow Eudial onto a remote island. However, the invitation turns out to be a trick, and Michiru's pure heart is taken, which turns into the mystical Deep Aqua Mirror. Haruka, in order to release her own Talisman, shoots herself with Eudial's captured gun. Her pure heart transforms into the mystical Space Sword.
111	22	"The Purity Chalice" "The Holy Grail's Mystical Power: Moon's Double Transformation"; Transliteration: "Seihai no shinpi na chikara! Mūn nidan henshin" (Japanese: 聖杯の神秘な力!ムーン二段変身)	Hiroki Shibata	Sukehiro Tomita	Kazuyuki Hashimoto	Ikuko Itō	October 22, 1994	July 11, 2000
Sailor Pluto appears and reawakens Sailor Uranus and Sailor Neptune, and the three Talismans resonate with each other (the third and last being Sailor Pluto's Garnet Orb). The Holy Grail appears, and Sailor Moon grabs it and evolves into Super Sailor Moon, who drives Eudial out. Mimete then kills Eudial of an accident by sabotaging her car with snails, causing her to drive off a ledge into the sea.
112	23	"Show Stoppers" "Who is the True Messiah? Chaos of Light and Darkness"; Transliteration: "Shin no Meshia wa dare? Hikari to kage no kaosu" (Japanese: 真の救世主は誰?光と影のカオス)	Noriyo Sasaki	Shigeru Yanagawa	Minoru Ōkōchi	Shinya Hasegawa	November 5, 1994	July 12, 2000
The girls end up watching the filming of a movie, where Chibiusa encounters a mysterious girl named Hotaru Tomoe, whom she quickly befriends. But in the end, she is revealed to be the 12-year-old daughter of Professor Souichi Tomoe, the possessed leader of the Death Busters. Super Sailor Moon uses "Rainbow Moon Heartache" to defeat the Daimon of the day.
113	24	"Rini's Risky Friendship" "A House Filled with Evil Presence: The Beautiful Hotaru's Secret"; Transliteration: "Yōki tadayou ie! Bishōjo Hotaru no himitsu" (Japanese: 妖気漂う家!美少女ほたるの秘密)	Kōnosuke Uda	Megumi Sugihara	Kenichi Tajiri	Taichi Nakamura	November 12, 1994	July 13, 2000
The three Outer Guardians appear to Tuxedo Mask, and tell him why they cannot fight alongside Sailor Moon and the other four Sailor Guardians. Usagi and Chibiusa visit Hotaru, and see a woman who looks like Kaolinite. The Messiah of Silence appears demanding pure hearts.
114	25	"Mimet's Mess" "I Love Idols: Mimete's Dilemma"; Transliteration: "Aidoru daisuki! Nayameru Mimetto" (Japanese: アイドル大好き!悩めるミメット)	Harume Kosaka	Yoji Enokido	Yoshiyuki Shikano	Masahiro Andō	November 19, 1994	July 14, 2000
Minako and Mimete enter a beauty contest at the same time, with Mimete willing to risk it all to obtain victory. Both fall short of the needed votes to win the idol position, and Mimete decides to just go back to her evil ways.
115	26	"The Shadow of Silence" "Shadow of Silence: The Pale Glimmer of a Firefly"; Transliteration: "Chinmoku no kage!? Awaki Hotaru bi no yurameki" (Japanese: 沈黙の影!?あわき蛍火のゆらめき)	Takuya Igarashi	Yoji Enokido	Kenichi Tajiri	Katsumi Tamegai	November 26, 1994	July 17, 2000
Hotaru overexerts herself, and is hospitalized, during which her past without friends is shown, and the reasons for it. Meanwhile, Mimete targets a soap opera actor, during which the attacking Daimon runs near Hotaru, who glows and completely freezes the Daimon.
116	27	"Thorny Weather" "Sunny Skies After a Storm: A Friendship Dedicated to Hotaru"; Transliteration: "Arashi nochi hare! Hotaru ni sasageru yūjō" (Japanese: 嵐のち晴れ!ほたるに捧げる友情)	Yūji Endō	Megumi Sugihara	Kazuhisa Asai	Jouji Yanase	December 3, 1994	July 18, 2000
Mamoru takes Usagi, Chibiusa and Hotaru to a botanical garden that is tended by Yoshiki Kurebayashi, an old classmate of his. While there, Mimete targets Yoshiki's pure heart and causes a storm that puts the plants at risk. Sailor Moon defeats the accompanying Daimon, U-Bara.
117	28	"Heightened Hazard" "Higher and Stronger: A Cheer from Usagi"; Transliteration: "Yori takaku, yori tsuyoku! Usagi no ōen" (Japanese: より高くより強く!うさぎの応援)	Kunihiko Ikuhara	Shigeru Yanagawa	Minoru Ōkōchi	Taichi Nakamura	December 10, 1994	July 19, 2000
Hotaru wishes to give a letter to Shun Hayase, a famous athlete. He becomes targeted when she goes to give it to him, and she possessively blasts the enemy with a hugely strong amount of energy. She talks to Shun about being frail and weak, and he thanks her for talking to him.
118	29	"It's in the Cards" "The Battle Inside the Demonic Space: The Sailor Guardians' Gamble"; Transliteration: "Makū no tatakai! Sērā Senshi no kake" (Japanese: 魔空の戦い!セーラー戦士の賭け)	Noriyo Sasaki	Katsuyuki Sumisawa	Kenichi Tajiri	Masahide Yanagisawa	December 17, 1994	July 20, 2000
Mimete attempts to create a Daimon by herself, throwing the entire Tomoe house into another dimension. The Guardians enter the dimension and are defeated by a game-master Daimon named U-Ikasaman. Hotaru manages to assist in her defeat by the use of a bluff.
119	30	"Goodness Eclipsed" "The Messiah of Silence Awakens? Stars of Destiny"; Transliteration: "Chinmoku no Meshia kakusei? Unmei no hoshiboshi" (Japanese: 沈黙のメシアの覚せい?運命の星々)	Harume Kosaka	Yoji Enokido	Kazuhisa Asai	Shinya Hasegawa	December 24, 1994	September 13, 2000
The Sailor Guardians visit a planetarium, where the narrator is attacked by a Daimon. The purple symbol of Saturn appears on Hotaru's forehead, and she attacks the Daimon by immbolizing it, an ability passed down from Sailor Saturn herself. However, Sailor Uranus, Sailor Neptune, and Sailor Pluto all attack the Sailor Saturn-possessed Hotaru, since she is not only the reincarnation of the infamous Sailor Guardian of Ruin and Rebirth herself, but also host to the extraterrestrial entity known as the Messiah of Silence. Super Sailor Moon takes the blow to protect Hotaru, thus sparing Sailor Saturn as well.: Sailor Saturn and her Silence Glaive debuted in Haruka and Michiru's imagination earlier in the episode as a silhouette.
120	31	"Next in Line" "An Invasion from another Dimension: Mystery of Infinity Academy"; Transliteration: "Ijigen kara no shinryaku! Mugen Gakuen no nazo" (Japanese: 異次元からの侵略!無限学園の謎)	Kōnosuke Uda	Megumi Sugihara	Minoru Ōkōchi	Katsumi Tamegai	January 7, 1995	July 21, 2000
Chibiusa goes to Hotaru's house to find that Hotaru has disappeared, and is devastated about it. At the same time, the Sailor Guardians investigate Infinity Academy, where Mimete tries one final time to defeat them before Tellu literally pulls the plug on her operation.
121	32	"Fiendish Ferns" "A Heart-Snatching Demon Flower: Tellu, the Third Witch"; Transliteration: "Kokoro wo ubau yōka! Daisan no majō, Teruru" (Japanese: 心を奪う妖花!第三の魔女,テルル)	Takuya Igarashi	Shigeru Yanagawa	Kazuyuki Hashimoto	Taichi Nakamura	January 14, 1995	July 24, 2000
Tellu develops a new plan to steal pure hearts, using a plant bred for that purpose. Setsuna Meioh (Sailor Pluto's civilian identity) realizes it is an alien plant made to steal pure hearts, and warns the Sailor Guardians. Tuxedo Mask causes a mutated plant to destroy Tellu, leading to them tracing her back to the mysterious Infinity Academy.
122	33	"The Science of Love" "Believe in Love: Ami, the Kindhearted Guardian"; Transliteration: "Ai wo shinjite! Ami, kokoro yasashiki Senshi" (Japanese: 愛を信じて!亜美心優しき戦士)	Yūji Endō	Sukehiro Tomita	Kenichi Tajiri	Hideyuki Motohashi	January 21, 1995	July 25, 2000
Ami investigates the Infinity Academy, where she meets Viluy, the fourth of the Witches 5. Viluy attempts to use her nanorobots to steal pure hearts from entrance exam takers. But after her battle, her own microscopic robots turn against her, destroying her in the process.
123	34	"Wake Up Call" "Shadows of Destruction: The Messiah of Silence Awakens"; Transliteration: "Hametsu no kage! Chinmoku no Meshia no mezame" (Japanese: 破滅の影!沈黙のメシアの目覚め)	Harume Kosaka	Megumi Sugihara	Minoru Ōkōchi	Mari Tominaga	January 28, 1995	July 26, 2000
The fifth and last of the Witches 5, Cyprine steals pure hearts from Infinity Academy students, and the Sailor Guardians engage Cyprine, and her alter-ego, Ptilol, in a showdown. Meanwhile, Chibiusa is abducted by the recently resurrected Kaolinite, and her pure heart is stolen by Mistress 9, having taken over Hotaru's body, which allows her to awaken as the Messiah of Silence.
124	35	"Who's Really Who?" "The Imminent Terror of Darkness: Struggles of the Eight Guardians"; Transliteration: "Semari kuru yami no kyōfu! Kusen no Hassenshi" (Japanese: 迫り来る闇の恐怖!苦戦の8戦士)	Takuya Igarashi	Yoji Enokido	Kazuyuki Hashimoto	Ikuko Itō	February 4, 1995	July 28, 2000
Mistress 9 uses all remaining Daimon eggs to create a powerful energized shield of evil minions around Infinity Academy. Sailor Moon is abducted, as she is the holder of the Holy Grail. After witnessing Sailor Pluto ultimately sacrificing herself to save them by using her forbidden ability to stop time, Sailor Uranus and Sailor Neptune defeat Germatoid, the Daimon possessing Professor Tomoe with their Talismans.
125	36	"Darkness, My Old Friend" "The Shining Shooting Star: Saturn and the Messiah"; Transliteration: "Kagayaku ryūsei! Satān soshite Meshia" (Japanese: 輝く流星!サターンそして救世主)	Kōnosuke Uda	Yoji Enokido	Kenichi Tajiri	Ikuko Itō	February 11, 1995	July 29, 2000
Sailor Moon is tricked into giving Mistress 9 the Holy Grail, which she uses to summon Master Pharaoh 90, the true mastermind of the Death Busters, to Earth. Hotaru regains consciousness with the assistance of Sailor Moon and her father, destroying Mistress 9 and fully awakening the spirit of Sailor Saturn within herself at last. Sailor Saturn herself returns Chibiusa's pure heart crystal, and then appears before Sailor Moon to ultimately sacrifice herself and eliminate Pharaoh 90 once and for all with her destructive powers, but Sailor Moon gains the help of the other six Sailor Guardians to become Super Sailor Moon once again, and save both Hotaru and Sailor Saturn, who is reborn as a baby immediately afterward.: This marks the full debut of Sailor Saturn herself, having first appeared in six episodes earlier as a silhouette in the imagination of Haruka, Michiru and Setsuna.
126	37	"Second Chance" "A New Life: Parting of the Stars of Destiny"; Transliteration: "Atarashiki inochi! Unmei no hoshiboshi wakare no toki" (Japanese: 新しき生命!運命の星々別離の時)	Yūji Endō	Megumi Sugihara	Kazuhisa Asai	Taichi Nakamura	February 18, 1995	July 30, 2000
Haruka and Michiru give the newly reborn infant Hotaru to a still-healing Professor Tomoe, who is finally free of the Death Busters. However, they viciously attack Sailor Moon, for she protected Hotaru's body and Sailor Saturn's spirit within her, and risked the whole entire world for two lives. The Legendary Silver Crystal throws them back, and they kneel to her as their future Neo-Queen and leave the city but not before they imply that, with Sailor Saturn having been saved, Hotaru is still alive and that they will definitely see her again.
127	38	"Tough Kindness" "A Guardian's Realization: Strength Lies Within a Pure Heart"; Transliteration: "Senshi no jikaku! Tsuyosa wa pyua na kokoro no naka ni" (Japanese: 戦士の自覚! 強さは純な心の中に)	Harume Kosaka	Sukehiro Tomita	TBA	Masahiro Ando	February 25, 1995	August 1, 2000
Chibiusa returns to the future after receiving a letter from her mother Neo-Queen Serenity and her father King Endymion. Meanwhile, a final Daimon emerges from the rubble of Infinity Academy, and Chibiusa returns just in time to help Usagi to defeat it.

== Home video releases ==
=== Japanese ===
==== DVD ====
Toei Video (Japan, Region 2 DVD)
Volume		Episodes	Release date	Ref.
美少女戦士セーラームーン Sスーパー	1	90–95	January 2005	
美少女戦士セーラームーン Sスーパー	2	96–101	January 2005	
美少女戦士セーラームーン Sスーパー	3	102–107	February 2005	
美少女戦士セーラームーン Sスーパー	4	108–112	February 2005	
美少女戦士セーラームーン Sスーパー	5	113–117	March 2005	
美少女戦士セーラームーン Sスーパー	6	118–122	March 2005	
美少女戦士セーラームーン Sスーパー	7	123–127	April 2005	
美少女戦士セーラームーン Sスーパー DVD COLLECTION	1	90–107	April 21, 2010	
美少女戦士セーラームーン Sスーパー DVD COLLECTION	2	108–127	July 21, 2010	

==== Blu-ray ====
Toei Video (Japan, Region 2)
Volume		Episodes	Release date	Ref.
美少女戦士セーラームーンS BLU-RAY COLLECTION	1	90–111	November 14, 2018	
美少女戦士セーラームーンS BLU-RAY COLLECTION	2	112–127	January 9, 2019	

=== English ===
==== VHS ====
===== United States =====
Pioneer Entertainment
Volume	Episodes	Release date	Ref.
Pure Hearts	90–93 (83–86 edited)	February 6, 2001	
The Love War	94–96 (87–89 edited)	February 6, 2001	
Labyrinth	97–99 (90–92 edited)	April 10, 2001	
Birthday Blues	100–102 (93–95 edited)	April 10, 2001	
Back from the Future	103–105 (96–98 edited)	June 12, 2001	
Secret Destiny	106–108 (99–101 edited)	June 12, 2001	
The Secret Revealed	109–111 (102–104 edited)	August 14, 2001	
The Search for the Savior	112–114 (105–107 edited)	August 14, 2001	
Hotaru's Secret	115–117 (108–110 edited)	October 9, 2001	
The Mysterious Sailor	118–120 (111–113 edited)	October 9, 2001	
Small Hearts	121–123 (114–116 edited)	November 27, 2001	
The Awakening!	124–127 (117–120 edited)	November 27, 2001	

==== DVD ====
===== United States =====
Pioneer Entertainment (Region 1)
Volume	Episodes	Release date	Ref.
Heart Collection I	90–96 (83–89 edited)	February 6, 2001	
Heart Collection II	97–102 (90–95 edited)	April 10, 2001	
Heart Collection III	103–108 (96–101 edited)	June 12, 2001	
Heart Collection IV	109–114 (102–107 edited)	August 14, 2001	
Heart Collection V	115–120 (108–113 edited)	October 9, 2001	
Heart Collection VI	121–127 (114–120 edited)	November 27, 2001	
Sailor Moon S - The Complete Uncut TV Set	90–127 (83–120 edited)	July 6, 2004	

Viz Media (Region 1)
Volume	Episodes	Release date	Ref.
Season 3 Part 1	90–108	November 15, 2016	
Season 3 Part 2	109–127	June 20, 2017	

===== Australia and New Zealand =====
Madman Entertainment (Region 4)
Volume	Episodes	Release date	Ref.
Season 3 Part 1	90–108	February 8, 2017	
Season 3 Part 2	109–127	August 16, 2017	
Complete Series	90–127	May 9, 2018	

==== Blu-ray ====
The third season, as the previous 2 seasons, has been remastered twice through software upscaling processes and re-released by Viz as 1080p Blu-Ray disc sets with a 4:3 aspect ratio.

===== United States =====
Viz Media (Region A)
Volume	Episodes	Release date	Ref.
Season 3 Part 1	90–108	November 15, 2016	
Season 3 Part 2	109–127	June 20, 2017	
Complete Third Season	90-127	July 25, 2023	

===== Australia and New Zealand =====
Madman Entertainment (Region B)
Volume	Episodes	Release date	Ref.
Complete Series	90–127	May 9, 2018	

== Film ==
Sailor Moon S: The Movie, originally released Japan as Pretty Soldier Sailor Moon S The Movie (劇場版 美少女戦士セーラームーンS, Gekijōban Bishōjo Senshi Sērā Mūn Sūpā) and later as Pretty Guardian Sailor Moon S, while released in the U.S. as Sailor Moon S the Movie: Hearts in Ice in the Pioneer Entertainment dub, and simply as Sailor Moon S: The Movie in Viz media's re-dub, is an anime film directed by Hiroki Shibata and written by Sukehiro Tomita. The film is adapted from a side story of the original manga series created by Naoko Takeuchi, The Lover of Princess Kaguya. The film was released on December 4, 1994, in Japan as part of the Winter '94 Toei Anime Fair.

== Video games ==
Several video games were released to promote this season, most of them developed or published by Bandai. In 1994, the puzzle video game Bishoujo Senshi Sailor Moon S: Kondo wa Puzzle de Oshiokiyo! was developed by Tom Create and published by Bandai for Super Nintendo Entertainment System. A fighting game named Bishoujo Senshi Sailor Moon S: Jōgai Rantō!? Shuyaku Sōdatsusen was developed by Arc System Works and published by Angel (a subsidiary company of Bandai) also in 1994 for Super NES. In 1995, another puzzle game called Bishoujo Senshi Sailor Moon S Kurukkurin was developed by Tom Create for Super NES. In the same year, Shimada Kikaku developed a fighting game for Game Gear called Bishoujo Senshi Sailor Moon S. In 1994, trivia game Bishoujo Senshi Sailor Moon S: Quiz Taiketsu! Sailor Power Ketsushuu was developed and published for Playdia. Also developed and published in 1994 was another trivia game called Bishoujo Senshi Sailor Moon S: Kotaete Moon Call!, for Terebikko. The following year, Tose developed Pretty Soldier Sailor Moon S, a fighting game for 3DO Interactive Multiplayer.
