= Sailor Moon musicals =

Family of Japanese musical theatre shows based on the Sailor Moon manga

- Flyer from the 2004 musical
- Music: Akiko Kosaka
- Lyrics: Kayoko Fuyumori; Junya Saiki
- Basis: Sailor Moon by Naoko Takeuchi

The Sailor Moon musicals (セーラームーン・ミュージカル, Sērāmūn Myūjikaru), commonly referred to as Sera Myu (セラミュー, Sērāmyū), are a series of live theatre productions based on the Sailor Moon manga by Naoko Takeuchi. The series consists of 40 musicals which have had more than 800 performances since the show opened in the summer of 1993. The first set of musicals, which ran from 1993 to 2005, were produced by Bandai with over 500 performances. The current musicals have been produced by Nelke Planning (a subsidiary of Dwango) since 2013.

== History ==
Each musical typically runs for three engagements per year, timed to align with school holidays in the winter, spring, and summer. Musicals were historically staged at the Sunshine Theatre in Ikebukuro, Tokyo in the winter and spring, and tour Japan in the summer.

After The New Legend of Kaguya Island (Revised Edition) (新・かぐや島伝説 <改訂版>, Shin Kaguya Shima Densetsu (Kaiteiban)) was staged in January 2005, the actresses for Moon, Mercury, and Jupiter "graduated" (left the show), and the series went on hiatus.

In June 2013, Takeuchi's editor Fumio Osano announced that a new Sailor Moon musical, La Reconquista, would open in September 2013, with Takeuchi personally auditioning actresses for the cast. The cast featured Satomi Ōkubo as Sailor Moon, Miyabi Matsuura as Sailor Mercury, Kanon Nanaki as Sailor Mars, Yū Takahashi as Sailor Jupiter, Shiori Sakata as Sailor Venus, and Yūga Yamato as Tuxedo Mask, making La Reconquista the first Sailor Moon musical where all roles were played by women. The musical recounts the battles between the Sailor Soldiers and the Dark Kingdom over the search for the Silver Crystal. The musical was produced, directed and written by Takuya Hiramitsu, who directed SeraMyu from 1995 to 1998, with music by Toshihiko Sahashi. The musical ran from September 13 to 23 at the AiiA Theater Tokyo in Shibuya, Tokyo.

Petite Étrangère, a musical based on Sailor Moon R, ran at AiiA Theater Tokyo from August 21 to August 31, 2014, and at Osaka from September 5 to September 7. A version of Petite Étrangère was staged in Shanghai, China, in January 2015 at the Shanghai Theatre Academy Theatre for a run of five performances, making Petite Étrangère the first official Japanese production of a Sailor Moon musical to open outside Japan.

The series made its North America debut in 2019 with Pretty Soldier Sailor Moon - The Super Live, which was staged as a limited engagement on March 29 and 30 at the PlayStation Theater in New York City. The musical also played at the Warner Theatre in Washington, D.C., on March 24. The show debuted in London at Outernet London in February 2025.

== Recurring elements ==
The musicals typically feature a theme song, usually performed after the Sailor Soldiers defeat the antagonist; sight gags (such as cross-dressing and puns); and songs tailored for characters or groupings of characters, such as romantic songs between Usagi Tsukino and Mamoru Chiba, attack songs for the Sailor Soldiers, songs the Sailor Soldiers perform as civilians, and villain songs.

"Revised Versions" (known as Kaiteiban) are another major aspect of Sailor Moon musicals. Generally, new musicals are staged in the summer are revised for the winter. The overarching plot remains the same, but certain plot elements are rearranged: villains who were only partially defeated in the original version of the show are fully defeated or healed, and actresses who are "graduating" are given more solo parts or speaking lines.

Often, the musicals expand upon plot concepts presented in the anime and manga. Most notably, a romance between the four Sailor Soldiers and the Four Kings of Heaven in their former lives was adapted from a manga image picturing the two groups paired off as romantic couples. In addition to adapting material from anime and manga versions of Sailor Moon, the musical series also has two original plot lines: The Legend of Kaguya Island (かぐや島伝説) and the Last Dracul (series.

Most shows end with an extended curtain call and encore, during which a number of songs are performed. Popular songs from the anime series such as "Moonlight Densetsu" and "La Soldier", which would not make narrative sense in the plot of the musical, are frequently performed as fan service. Special fan appreciation shows referred to as FanKan (deriving from "fan thank you") are used as season finales, where multiple fan service numbers are performed and new actresses are introduced.

The musicals have introduced new characters to the series, often as new members of existing groups of villains, such as Spotted Tilmun, Aaron and Manna from the Black Moon Clan, the Death Mannetjes and the Death Nightmares from the Death Busters, and Sailors Pewter Fox, Titanium Kerokko, Theta, and Buttress from Shadow Galactica. The musicals have also created original characters that have never appeared in any other version of the series, such as Sailor Astarte, Vulcan, Count Dracul, Bloody Dracul Vampir, Undead Berserk, and Death Lamia, among others.

== Production ==
The sets and backdrops range from simple (only some set pieces, no backdrop or backdrop with uncomplicated paintings) to mid elaborate (a greater number of small set pieces, and some bigger ones, for example, a painted wall over the whole width of the stage with a few attached stairs and a big door), more detailed set pieces, with heavy use of different stage levels, trapdoors and hidden doors. The Sailor Soldiers' attacks are represented by colored lights hitting their targets, and sometimes minor explosions and other small pyrotechnics (for example "flame paper", special paper stripes which the actors ignite in their hands and then throw to create the illusion of a "fireball") are used. The Sailor Soldiers mostly transform off-stage (or just appear already transformed), while their transformation phrases can be heard. Only Usagi transforms on stage. This is done with the help of a body double and the "black out" of part of the stage or set pieces moving in front of her while the actors switch places. The only real "transformation sequence" that ever occurs is a pre-filmed video sequence projected onto a scrim showing the actors "morph" (with some pink ribbons) into their transformed versions.

== List of musicals ==
"Stage" is a term used widely to refer to groupings of the musicals.

Bandai, the producers of the first 12 years of Sailor Moon musical productions, divided their musical productions into three stages. The first stage consisted of those in which Sailor Moon was portrayed by Anza Ohyama, the first and longest running Sailor Moon actress. This stage ran parallel to the manga and anime, as reflected by the plot, and had a nearly full graduation with all of the main actresses being replaced. The second stage included three different Sailor Moon actresses, the only fully original musical (The Legend of Kaguya Island) and the semi-original Last Dracul series, ending with a remake of the original "Final First Stage" musical, Eien Densetsu (titled Kakyuu Ouhi Kourin.) The third stage retained Marina Kuroki as lead actress, but ran for only two musicals (both remakes of The Legend of Kaguya Island), and ended in January 2005.

The series resumed after a hiatus with the 20th Anniversary Stage in 2013, featuring Satomi Ōkubo as the new Sailor Moon. Unlike previous productions, these musicals, now overseen by Nelke Planning, were not categorized into distinct official stages..

Conversely, most Western fans break the stages down by the actresses who played Sailor Moon: Anza Ohyama, Fumina Hara, Miyuki Kanbe, and Marina Kuroki. The list below is divided up according to the official stages used by Sera Myu producers.

=== Bandai productions (1993–2005) ===
==== First stage ====
Featuring Anza Ohyama as Sailor Moon:

- 1993 Summer Special Musical Pretty Soldier Sailor Moon
  Gaiden Dark Kingdom Fukkatsu Hen (外伝 ダーク・キングダム復活篇)
- 1994 Winter Special Musical Pretty Soldier Sailor Moon
  Gaiden Dark Kingdom Fukkatsu Hen (Kaiteiban) (外伝 ダーク・キングダム復活篇（改訂版）)
- Pretty Soldier Sailor Moon Super Spring Festival
  Pretty Soldier Sailor Moon Super Spring Festival (スーパースプリングフェスティバル 美少女戦士セーラームーン)
- 1994 Summer Special Musical Pretty Soldier Sailor Moon S
  Usagi - Ai no Senshi e no Michi (うさぎ・愛の戦士への道)
- 1995 Winter Special Musical Pretty Soldier Sailor Moon S
  Henshin - Super Senshi e no Michi (変身・スーパー戦士への道)
- 1995 Spring Special Musical Pretty Soldier Sailor Moon S
  Henshin - Super Senshi e no Michi (Kaiteiban) (変身・スーパー戦士への道（改訂版）)
- 1995 Summer Special Musical Pretty Soldier Sailor Moon SuperS
  Yume Senshi - Ai - Eien ni... (夢戦士・愛・永遠に...)
- 1996 Spring Special Musical Pretty Soldier Sailor Moon SuperS (Kaiteiban)
  Yume Senshi - Ai - Eien ni... Saturn Fukkatsu Hen! (夢戦士・愛・永遠に...サターン復活篇!)
- Pretty Soldier Sailor Moon SuperS Special Musical Show
- 1996 Summer Special Musical Pretty Soldier Sailor Moon Sailor Stars
- 1997 Winter Special Musical Pretty Soldier Sailor Moon Sailor Stars (Kaiteiban)
- 1997 Summer Special Musical Pretty Soldier Sailor Moon
  Eien Densetsu (永遠伝説)
- 1998 Winter Special Musical Pretty Soldier Sailor Moon
  Eien Densetsu (Kaiteiban) The Final First Stage!! (永遠伝説［改訂版］) The Final First Stage!!

==== Second stage ====
Featuring Fumina Hara as Sailor Moon:

- 1998 Summer Special Musical Pretty Soldier Sailor Moon
  Shin - Densetsu Kourin (新・伝説光臨)
- 1999 Spring Special Musical Pretty Soldier Sailor Moon
  Kaguya Shima Densetsu (かぐや島伝説)
- 1999 Summer Special Musical Pretty Soldier Sailor Moon
  Kaguya Shima Densetsu (Kaiteiban) Natsuyasumi! Houseki Tankentai (かぐや島伝説＜改訂版＞夏休み!宝石探検隊)

Featuring Miyuki Kanbe as Sailor Moon:

- 2000 Winter Special Musical Pretty Soldier Sailor Moon
  Shin / Henshin - Super Senshi e no Michi (新 / 変身・スーパー戦士への道)
  Last Dracul Jokyoku (ラストドラクル序曲)
- 2000 Summer Special Musical Pretty Soldier Sailor Moon
  Kessen / Transylvania no Mori (決戦/トランシルバニアの森)
  ~Shin Toujou! ChibiMoon o Goru Senshi Tatsu~ (～新登場！ちびムーンを護る戦士達～)
- 2001 Winter Special Musical Pretty Soldier Sailor Moon
  Kessen / Transylvania no Mori (Kaiteiban) (決戦 / トランシルバニアの森＜改訂版＞)
  -Saikyou no Kataki Dark Cain no Nazo- (－最強の敵 ダーク・カインの謎－)
- 2001 Spring Special Musical Pretty Soldier Sailor Moon
  Last Dracul Saishuu Shou (ラスト・ドラクル最終章)
  Chou Wakusei Death Vulcan no Fuuin / Super Revue Musical Show (超惑星デス・バルカンの封印 / スパーレビューミュージカルショー)

Featuring Marina Kuroki as Sailor Moon:

- 2001 Summer Special Musical Pretty Soldier Sailor Moon
  Tanjou! Ankoku no Princess Black Lady (～誕生！暗黒のプリンセス ブラック・レディ～)
- 2002 Winter Special Musical Pretty Soldier Sailor Moon
  Tanjou! Ankoku no Princess Black Lady [Kaiteiban] -Wakusei Nemesis no Nazo- (誕生！暗黒のプリンセス ブラック・レディ［改訂版］～惑星ネメシスの謎～)
- 2002 Spring Special Musical Pretty Soldier Sailor Moon "10th Anniversary Festival"
  Musical Show "Ai no Sanctuary" (ミュージカルショー「愛のサンクチュアリー」)
  Memorial Talk & Live Show (メモリアルトーク&ライブショー)
- 2002 Summer Special Musical Pretty Soldier Sailor Moon
  Mugen Gakuen -Mistress Labyrinth- (無限学園～ミストレス・ラビリンス～)
- 2003 Winter Special Musical Pretty Soldier Sailor Moon
  Mugen Gakuen -Mistress Labyrinth- Kaiteiban (無限学園～ミストレス・ラビリンス～改訂版)
- 2003 Summer Special Musical Pretty Soldier Sailor Moon
  Starlights - Ryuusei Densetsu (スターライツ・流星伝説)
- 2004 Winter Special Musical Pretty Soldier Sailor Moon
  Kakyuu-Ouhi Kourin The Second Stage Final (火球王妃降臨) THE SECOND STAGE FINAL

==== Third stage ====
Featuring Marina Kuroki as Sailor Moon:

- 2004 Summer Special Musical Pretty Soldier Sailor Moon
  ~Shin Kaguya Shima Densetsu~ (～新かぐや島伝説～) NEW LEGEND OF KAGUYA ISLAND
- 2005 Winter Special Musical Pretty Soldier Sailor Moon
  Shin Kaguya Shima Densetsu (Kaiteiban) Marinamoon Final (新かぐや島伝説（改訂版) MARINAMOON FINAL

=== Nelke Planning productions (2013–present) ===
'Note: From this point onwards, the musicals, now produced by Nelke Planning, do not have numbered "stages".'

==== 20th Anniversary Musicals ====
Featuring Satomi Okubo as Sailor Moon:

- 2013 Pretty Guardian Sailor Moon
  La Reconquista
- 2014 Pretty Guardian Sailor Moon
  Petite Étrangère
- 2015 Pretty Guardian Sailor Moon
  Un Nouveau Voyage

Featuring Hotaru Nomoto as Sailor Moon:

- 2016 Pretty Guardian Sailor Moon
  Amour Eternal
- 2017 Pretty Guardian Sailor Moon
  Le Mouvement Final

==== Nogizaka46 Musicals ====
Featuring Mizuki Yamashita and Sayuri Inoue as Sailor Moon:

- 2018 Pretty Guardian Sailor Moon
  Nogizaka46-ban Musical "Bishōjo Senshi Sailor Moon" (乃木坂46版 ミュージカル 「美少女戦士セーラームーン」)

Featuring Shiori Kubo as Sailor Moon:

- 2019 Pretty Guardian Sailor Moon
  Nogizaka46-ban Musical "Bishōjo Senshi Sailor Moon" 2019 (乃木坂46版 ミュージカル 「美少女戦士セーラームーン」2019)

Featuring Nagi Inoue and Satsuki Sugawara as Sailor Moon:

- 2024 Pretty Guardian Sailor Moon
  Nogizaka 46 "5-kisei"-ban Musical "Bishōjo Senshi Sailor Moon" 2024 (乃木坂46"5期生"版 ミュージカル「美少女戦士セーラームーン」2024)

==== The Super Live ====
Featuring Kanae Yumemiya, Natsuki Koga and Tomomi Kasai as Sailor Moon

- 2018 Pretty Guardian Sailor Moon
  The Super Live

Featuring Kanae Yumemiya as Sailor Moon

- 2018 Pretty Guardian Sailor Moon
  The Super Live (Team Paris)

Featuring Tomomi Kasai as Sailor Moon

- 2019 Pretty Guardian Sailor Moon
  The Super Live (Team America)

Featuring Natsuki Koga as Sailor Moon

- 2023 Pretty Guardian Sailor Moon
  The Super Live (Team Taipei)

Featuring Yui Yokoyama as Sailor Moon

- 2025 Pretty Guardian Sailor Moon
  The Super Live (Team London)

Featuring Riko Tanaka as Sailor Moon

- 2025 Pretty Guardian Sailor Moon
  The Super Live (North American Tour)

==== 30th Anniversary Musicals ====
Featuring Riko Tanaka as Sailor Moon:

- 2021 Pretty Guardian Sailor Moon
  Kaguya-hime no Koibito (かぐや姫の恋人)
- 2022 Pretty Guardian Sailor Moon
  30 Shūnen Kinen Musical Festival -Chronicle- (30周年記念 Musical Festival -Chronicle-)

== List of albums ==
Songs from the series have been compiled in some 20 music albums, and many of the musicals have been released on DVD.

- "Pretty Soldier Sailor Moon S" Musical Theme Songs: La Soldier / Sailor War!
- Memorial Album of the Musical "Pretty Soldier Sailor Moon": An Alternate Legend: The Dark Kingdom Revival Story
- Memorial Album of the Musical 2 "Pretty Soldier Sailor Moon S": Usagi — The Path to Become the Soldier of Love
- Memorial Album of the Musical 3 "Pretty Soldier Sailor Moon SuperS": Dream Warriors — Love — Into Eternity...
- Memorial Album of the Musical 4 "Pretty Soldier Sailor Moon Sailor Stars"
- Memorial Album of the Musical 5 "Pretty Soldier Sailor Moon" Eternal Legend
- Memorial Album of the Musical "Pretty Soldier Sailor Moon": ~ Best Sound Track ~
- Memorial Album of the Musical 6 "Pretty Soldier Sailor Moon" Beginning of the New Legend* Memorial Album of the Musical 7 "Pretty Soldier Sailor Moon" Legend of Kaguya Island
- Memorial Album of the Musical "Pretty Soldier Sailor Moon": Theme Songs 1993~1999
- Memorial Album of the Musical 8 "Pretty Soldier Sailor Moon" New / Transformation — The Path to Become the Super Soldier — Overture of Last Dracul
- Memorial Album of the Musical "Pretty Soldier Sailor Moon": Best Songs Collection — Best Songs Chosen by Fans —
- Memorial Album of the Musical 9 "Pretty Soldier Sailor Moon" Decisive Battle / Transylvania's Forest ~ New Appearance! The Warriors Who Protect Chibi-Moon ~
- Memorial Album of the Musical "Pretty Soldier Sailor Moon": ~ Best Sound Track Vol. 2 ~
- Memorial Album of the Musical "Pretty Soldier Sailor Moon": Eternal Edition — Senshi Theme Songs + Karaoke Collection
- Memorial Album of the Musical "Pretty Soldier Sailor Moon": Love Ballad Edition
- Memorial Album of the Musical 10 "Pretty Soldier Sailor Moon" ~ Birth! The Princess of Darkness Black Lady ~
- Memorial Album of the Musical "Pretty Soldier Sailor Moon": Dark Side Edition: Best Songs
- Memorial Album of the Musical "Pretty Soldier Sailor Moon": Eternal Edition 2 — Birth! Princess of Darkness Black Lady [Revision] ~ The Secret of the Planet Nemesis ~
- Memorial Album of the Musical 11 "Pretty Soldier Sailor Moon" Infinity Academy ~ Mistress Labyrinth ~
- Memorial Album of the Musical "Pretty Soldier Sailor Moon": Eternal Edition 3 — "10th Anniversary" Sailor Moon to Issho ni Pretty Child — Infinity Academy ~ Mistress Labyrinth ~ Revision
- Memorial Album of the Musical 12 "Pretty Soldier Sailor Moon" ~ Starlights — Legend of the Shooting Stars ~
- Memorial Album of the Musical "Pretty Soldier Sailor Moon": ~ Best Sound Track Vol. 3 ~
- Memorial Album of the Musical 13 "Pretty Soldier Sailor Moon" ~ New Legend of Kaguya Island ~
- Memorial Album of the Musical "Pretty Soldier Sailor Moon": Eternal Edition 4 — MARINAMOON Special Edition — New Legend of Kaguya Island (Revision) MARINAMOON FINAL

== Reception ==
In total, 32,055 people attended Gaiden Dark Kingdom Fukkatsu Hen (外伝 ダーク・キングダム復活篇), which had 29 separate performances. 25,208 people attended its revised edition, which had 35 separate performances.
