= Aki Hoshino =

Japanese bikini idol

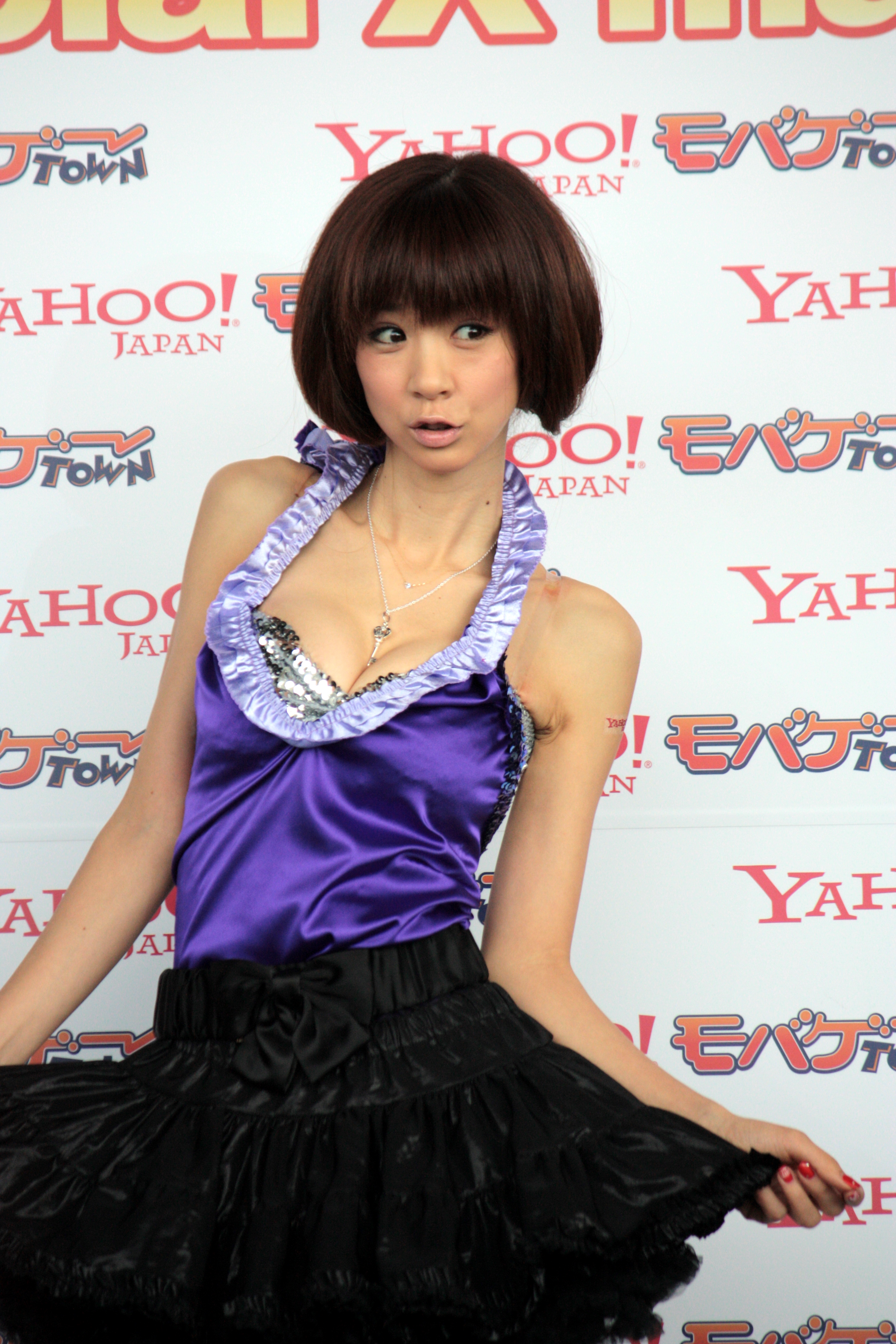
- Hoshino in 2010
- Born: March 14, 1977 (age 49); Tokyo, Japan
- Occupation: Bikini idol
- Spouse: Kousei Miura (m. 2011)
- Children: 1
- Modeling information
- Hair color: Brown
- Eye color: Brown

Aki Hoshino (ほしの あき, Hoshino Aki) is a Japanese bikini idol. She has appeared in various men's magazines, such as Sabra and television shows. In 2010, she was named one of the "7 most irresistibly cute Japanese idols" by the Thailand version of the men's magazine FHM.

== Biography ==
=== Personal life ===
Hoshino married jockey Kousei Miura on September 25, 2011. On April 12, 2012, she gave birth to their daughter.

=== Book ===
Hoshino authored a book, published in 2010, called Hoshino Body. In the book Hoshino gave advice to female readers on how to apply makeup and "retain one's body shape".

== Films ==
- Kamen Rider Den-O: I'm Born! (2007) - Senhime
- Gokusen: The Movie (2009) - Sakura Ayukawa

== DVDs ==
Aki Hoshino has featured in the following DVDs:

- I am Hoshino Aki (August 2002)
- Play H (February 2003)
- H School (October 2003)
- AAA - Triple A (December 2003)
- G Girl Private 001 (January 2004)
- Milk (March 2004)
- Darn-Tarn (May 2004)
- Se-jo! Series B: Aki Hoshino (September 2004)
- Mangekyō (October 2004)
- Silky Collection Se-jo!! (November 2004)
- Kekkō Kamen Returns (November 2004)
- Yaju no Shori Join 1316 (December 2004)
- Star (January 2005)
- Kekkō Kamen Surprise (February 2005)
- Beach Angels in Hawaii (April 2005)
- Honey Angel (May 2005)
- With you -Aki Hoshino (August 2005)
- NyaaA! (CD+DVD) (September 2005)
- I Wish You Love (September 2005)
- Gekkan Aki Hoshino (December 2005)
- Kachikomi Keiji Ondorya! Daisōsasen Shinsaibashi o Fūsa seyo (Japanese movie) (January 2006)
- Portfolio (January 2006)
- Girls love live (April 2006)
- Aki-Time (June 2006)
- Play H (July 2006)
- Watashi Tonjaimashita (July 2006)
- Hoshino Expo (July 2006)
- Gekkan Aki Hoshino Special (August 2006)
- Bengoshi no Kuzu DVD Box (Japanese TV series) (September 2006)
- Finder Love Guide DVD (September 2006)
- Koibito Gokko (October 2006)
- Marriage Life (December 2006)
- Kensa Nyuin (February 2007)
- Star-revealed (February 2007)
- Gokusen 3 (April 2008) - Ayukawa Sakura (school nurse)
- Sneaker Lover (March 2008)

== Video game ==
Aki Hoshino has featured in the following video game:

- Finder Love: Hoshino Aki - Nankoku Trouble Rendez-vous (ファインダーラブ ほしのあき 南国トラブル ランデブー, Finder Love: Aki Hoshino - Trouble Randezvous in the South) (June 29, 2006)

== Clothing ==
Aki Hoshino is known globally for her numerous collaborations with Japanese fashion brand Kiks Tyo. From 2006 to 2008, Hoshino was the brand's muse, appearing on photo print t-shirts, jackets, caps, Kubricks, and in many related print editorials, interviews and advertisements. Collaborative work with the brand paired Hoshino with additional collaborators including Hello Kitty, G-shock, Medicom Toy and photographer Yasumasa Yonehara.
