= Finder Love =

- The cover artwork for Finder Love, displaying Japanese bikini idol Aki Hoshino
- Developer: Capcom
- Publisher: Capcom
- Platform: PlayStation Portable
- Release: JP: June 29, 2006
- Genres: Adventure, dating sim
- Mode: Single-player

Finder Love (ファインダーラブ, Finder Love) is a series of video games published by Capcom for the PlayStation Portable and released in Japan on June 29, 2006. It is a dating sim in which the player has to take photos of or participate in mini-games with three Japanese bikini idols.

The series consists of three episodes, each featuring a different idol:

- Finder Love: Hoshino Aki - Nankoku Trouble Rendez-vous (ファインダーラブ ほしのあき 南国トラブル ランデブー, Finder Love: Aki Hoshino - Trouble Rendez-vous in the South)
- Finder Love: Hara Fumina - Futari no Futari de... (ファインダーラブ 原史奈 ふたりの ふたりで･･･。, Finder Love: Fumina Hara - Our time together)
- Finder Love: Kudō Risa - First Shoot ha kimi to (ファインダーラブ 工藤里紗 ファーストショットは君と。, Finder Love: Risa Kudō - First picture with you)

Each episode is available as a limited edition box containing more pictures of the game, a DVD and a bikini identical to the one worn by the model.

== Gameplay ==
Finder Love has two distinct game modes: an adventure game and a photography game.

The adventure part is similar to most Japanese romantic adventure games: the player reads and listens to what a girl says and occasionally has to choose an answer. The dialogue sequences are interspersed with mini-games such as rock-paper-scissors or rhythm games like PaRappa the Rapper.

During the photography game, the goal is to take successful shots of the model to access new outfits. It is also possible to exchange pictures with friends.
