= Marina Kuroki =

Japanese actress, singer and model (born 1988)

Marina Kuroki 黒木マリナ
- Born: 26 September 1988 (age 37); Tokyo, Japan
- Occupations: Actress, singer, model
- Years active: 2001ー2006

Marina Kuroki (黒木 マリナ, Kuroki Marina; born 26 September 1988) is a Japanese actress, singer and model best known for her appearances in the Sailor Moon musicals series.

== Career ==
She starred in the Sailor Moon musicals as the lead role of Usagi Tsukino at the age of 12 and finished her Sailor Moon career at 16 in 2005. She also appears in other musicals, such as Rock 'n Jam musicals. She has published photobooks, DVDs and CDs (mostly from the Sailor Moon musicals).

She moved to J-Pop and sang songs used in various anime Series. One of notable ones is in the Anime Onegai My Melody ~Kuru Kuru Shuffle!~.

== Personal life ==
Kuroki was born in Tokyo, Japan.

== Sailor Moon musicals ==
- Tanjou ~ Ankoku no Princess Black Lady + revision,
- Ai no Sanctuary,
- Mugen Gakuen ~ Mistress Labyrinth + revision,
- Starlights ~ Ryuusei Densetsu
- Kakyuu-Ouhi Kourin
- Shin Kaguya Shima Densetsu + revision

== Mymelody Musicals ==
- Kirikirisu
- Koikuru

Preceded by Miyuki Kanbe	Usagi Tsukino/Sailor Moon in the Sailor Moon musicals 2001–2005	Succeeded by Satomi Ōkubo
