= Shiori Kubo =

Japanese singer, actress and model (born 2001)

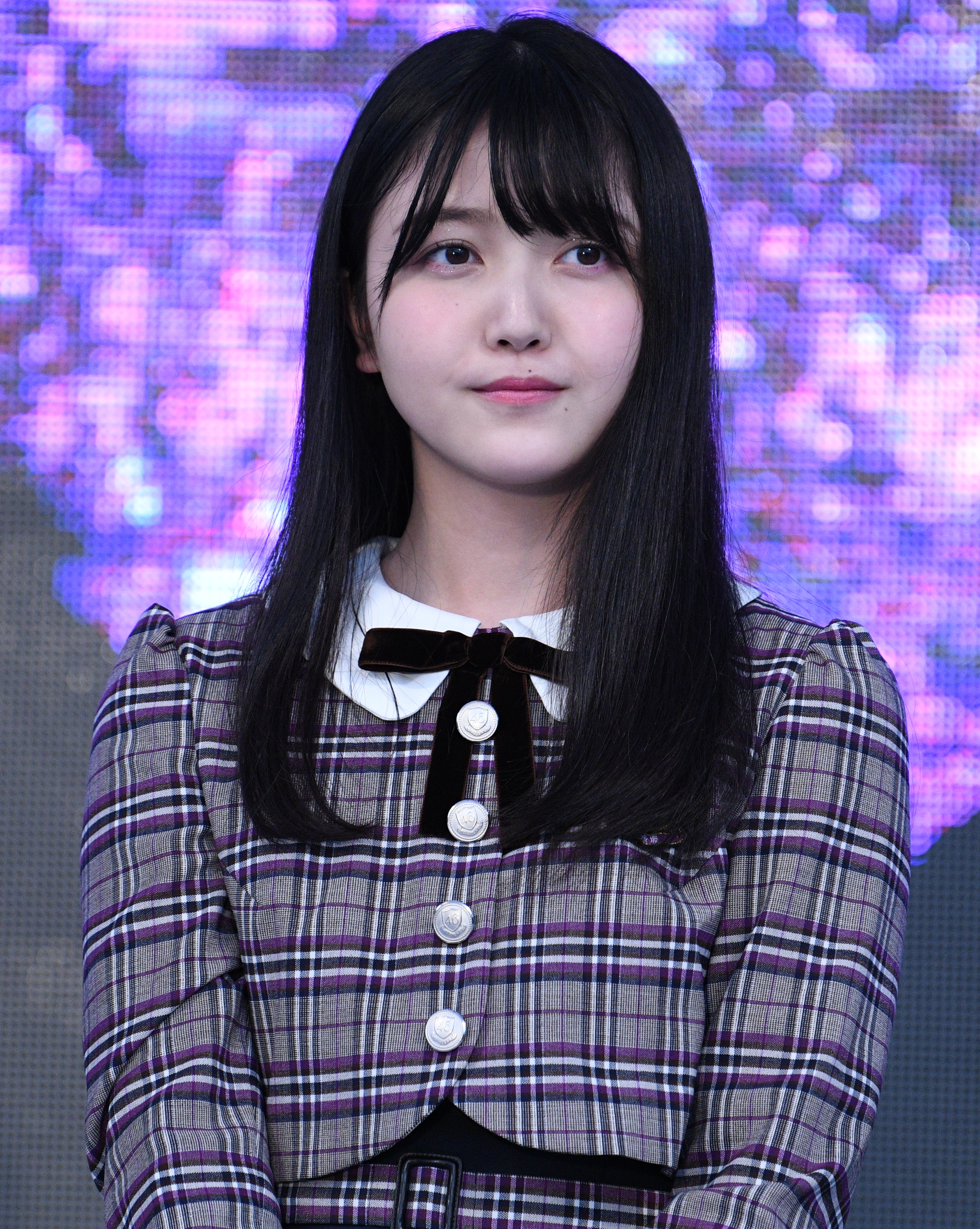
- Kubo in 2018
- Born: July 14, 2001 (age 25); Miyagi Prefecture, Japan
- Occupations: Actress; radio personality; model
- Years active: 2016–present
- Agent: Nogizaka46 LLC
- Height: 161 cm (5 ft 3 in)
- Musical career
- Origin: Tokyo
- Genres: J-pop
- Instrument: Vocals
- Years active: 2016–2025
- Label: Sony
- Formerly of: Nogizaka46

Japanese name
- Kanji: 久保 史緒里
- Hiragana: くぼ しおり
Transcriptions
- Romanization: Kubo Shiori

Signature
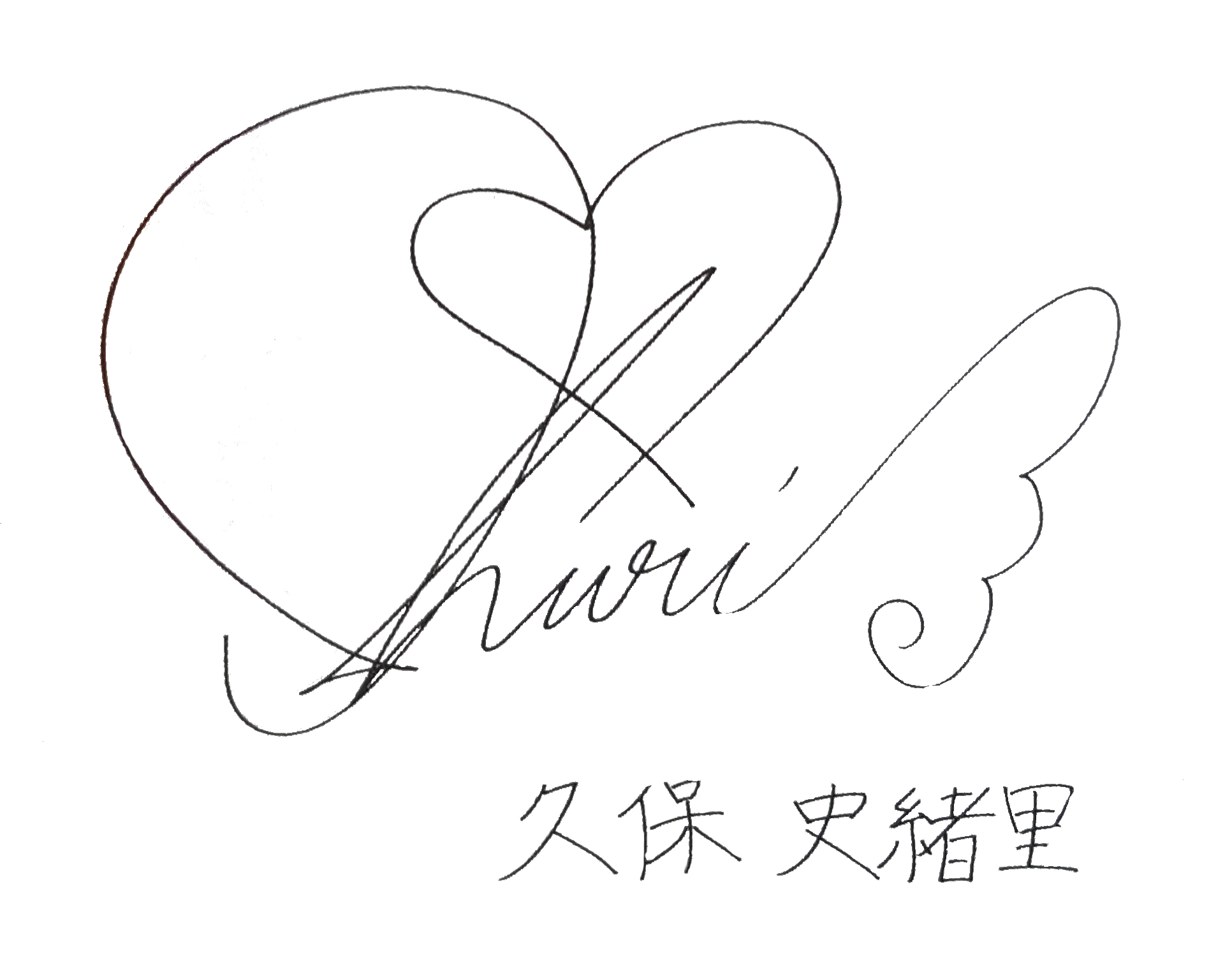

Shiori Kubo (久保 史緒里, Kubo Shiori; born July 14, 2001) is a Japanese actress, radio personality, and model. She is a former third-generation member of the idol girl group Nogizaka46. She is also a former exclusive model of the women's fashion magazine Seventeen. Her acting roles include the supporting roles of Honoka Hanamura in Zambi, Lady Gotoku in What Will You Do, Ieyasu?, and Rin Tsutsui in Me and Future Me!?

On September 16, 2025, Kubo announced her graduation from Nogizaka46.

== Filmography ==
=== Film ===
Year	Title	Role	Notes	Ref.
2022	A Girl in My Room	Aisuke	Lead role	
2023	River	Hisame		
2023	Life of Mariko in Kabuchiko	Ayaka		
2025	Hold Me Tighter Than Anyone Else	Tsukina Kirimoto		
2025	Nemurubaka: Hypnic Jerks	Iris Yuzumi		
2025	Echoes of Motherhood	Yui		
2026	Until We Meet Again	Rena Nagano		
2026	Kyoto-o	Shiho Tajima		

=== Television ===
Year	Title	Role	Notes	Ref.
2019	Zambi	Honoka Hanamura		
2020	Nogizaka Cinemas: Story of 46 "Vulnerability"		Episode 9	
2021	Kuroshinri: She teaches the Forbidden Psychology	Kuronosaki	Lead role	
2021	Summertime Machine Has Gone: Otome, Dignified		Anthology series	
2022	Shiosuke and Amami: Detectives Until Soba is Made	Kanro Kanami	Web series	
2023	What Will You Do, leyasu?	Gotoku	Taiga drama	
2023	Wave, Listen to Me!	Narrator	Episode 7	
2023	Sunset	Sara Tateishi		
2024	Me and Future Me!?	Rin Tsutsui		
2025	Monster	Mio		
2025	Anpan	Tamae Shiratori	Asadora	
2026	Sounds of Winter	Sae		

== Stage ==
=== Theater ===
Year	Title	Role	Notes	Ref.
2018	Three Sisters	Irina		
2018	Zambi	Maya Narusawa		
2019	Pretty Guardian Sailor Moon	Usagi Tsukino	Lead role	
2021	The Night is Short, Walk on Girl	"Black-haired maiden"		
2022	Ano Yoru Omoiteru			
2023	Sakurabun	Sakuraga Oiran/Masako Sasaoki	Lead role	
2023	Tengousei	Kamioroshi no Misaki		

== Bibliography ==
=== Magazine ===
- Seventeen (August 1, 2017 – March 1, 2024, Shueisha) – Exclusive model

=== Photobook ===
- Intersection (July 2023, 7, Shueisha)
