= Risa Kudō =

Japanese actress and model (born 1983)

Risa Kudō (工藤里紗, Kudō Risa), also known as Lisa Kudō, is a Japanese actress and gravure idol. She was born on October 4, 1983, in Kanagawa, Japan.

== Life and career ==
Kudō began her entertainment career as a "gravure" (non-nude) model in several DVD releases in 2005 and 2006. She made her film debut starring in the small town drama Sleeping Flower in October 2005. The next year, she played the character Chiharu Tanaka in the live action film version of the manga Love Com, which was released to theaters in July 2006. She also had a leading role in the November 2006 film Love Letter So-renka (ラブレター 蒼恋歌, Rabu retā: Sō-renka) which also starred Yuma Ishigaki and Yuika Motokariya.

Kudō also appeared in television dramas in 2006, first in the TV movie The School of Water Business (都立水商!, Toritsu Mizusho!) broadcast on Nippon Television (NTV) on March 18, 2006, and in the Tokyo Broadcasting System (TBS) series Hanayome wa Yakudoshi (花嫁は厄年ッ！) which ran from July to September 2006.

She was featured as a model in the game Finder Love: Risa Kudō - First Shoot ha kimi to (ファインダーラブ 工藤里紗 ファーストショットは君と。, Finder Love: Risa Kudō - First picture with you), released June 29, 2006, where the player can take photos of the digital model. A limited edition of the game was released that was bundled with the bikini she wears in-game, a DVD and pictures of her.

In 2007 Kudō appeared in an episode of the NTV comedy Haken no hinkaku (ハケンの品格) as well as continuing her career as a gravure model. Kudō starred in the title role for the low-budget horror film Rika: The Zombie Killer directed by Ken'ichi Fujiwara which was released theatrically in Japan in February 2008 and as a DVD with English subtitles as Zombie Hunter Rika in September 2009.

In August 2008, Kudō performed in the NTV war drama Kiri no Hi (霧の火) based on an event which occurred late in World War II and in May 2009, she appeared in the two part TBS TV movie Kimi no Sei (君のせい) playing Rino Kinoshita.

== Filmography ==
=== Movies ===
- Sleeping Flower (スリーピングフラワー, Surīpingu Furawā) (2005)
- Love.Com: The Movie (ラブ★コン, Rabu★con) (2006)
- Love Letter So-renka (ラブレター 蒼恋歌, Rabu retā: Sō-renka) (2006)
- Rika: The Zombie Killer aka Zombie Hunter Rika (最強兵器女子高生 ＲＩＫＡ, Saikyō heiki joshikōsei: Rika) (2008)

=== Television ===
- Hanayome wa Yakudoshi (花嫁は厄年ッ！) (2006)
- Haken no hinkaku (ハケンの品格) (2007) Episode 6
- Kiri no Hi (霧の火) (2008)
- Kimi no Sei (君のせい) (2009)
