= Miyuki Kanbe =

Japanese actress and singer (1984–2008)

- 神戸 みゆき
- Born: 7 May 1984; Kawasaki, Kanagawa, Japan
- Died: 18 June 2008 (aged 24); Tokyo, Japan
- Occupations: model; actress; singer
- Years active: 1999–2007
- Notable credit(s): Sailor Moon musicals as Usagi Tsukino; Kamen Rider Hibiki as Hinaka Tachibana; Battle Royale II as Kyouko Kakehi

Miyuki Kanbe (神戸 みゆき, Kanbe Miyuki; 7 May 1984 – 18 June 2008) was a Japanese actress, model and singer. Throughout her career, she starred as Sailor Moon in the Sailor Moon musicals, as well as portraying Hinaka Tachibana in Kamen Rider Hibiki and Kyouko Kakehi in Battle Royale II. In addition to acting, Kanbe also pursued a singing career, where her songs were used as the theme songs to the anime series Mermaid Melody Pichi Pichi Pitch.

== Career ==
Kanbe portrayed Sailor Moon in the Sailor Moon musicals. Kanbe was chosen out of 500 women for the role. Much of her career involved physically demanding roles.

As late as June 2008, she had been active and vocally expressing an interest in furthering her career. She was cast in the role of Eponine in the Japanese production of Les Misérables and in Miss Saigon, but was forced to give them up due to poor health in February 2007.

== Death ==
Since February 2007, Kanbe had been in and out of the hospital until dying at 4:08 am on 18 June 2008 due to sudden heart failure. Her funeral was held in Kawasaki, Kanagawa on 21 June 2008.

== Filmography ==
=== Live-action television ===
- Moero!! Robocon (1999), Nanako Yokokawa (episode 43)
- D-girls Idol Tantei San Shimai Monogatari (2001) (episode 11)
- Hatchobori no Nana Nin (2003), Oyumi (episode 3)
- Kamen Rider Hibiki (2005–2006), Hinaka Tachibana
- Kyoto Chiken no Onna (2006), Tamiko Kuraki

=== Television animation ===
- Yume ☆ Ouen Tai (1999–2000)
- Ikaring no Menseki (2000), apparently at HYPER GO Gou
- Ucchan Nanchan no Urinari!! (2001–2002)
- LF+R Morning YOUNG LIVE JAPAN / Young Live Nippon LF+R Music TV (2001–2003)
- Baku NEW (2001–2002)
- Mermaid Melody Pichi Pichi Pitch (2003), Auri (episode 34)

=== Film ===
- Battle Royale II (2003), Kyouko Kakehi
- 69 sixty nine (2004)
- Kamen Rider Hibiki & The Seven Fighting Demons (2005), Hinaka Tachibana / Hinako

=== Theatre ===
- Sailor Moon musicals (2000–2001) as Usagi Tsukino
  - 2000 Winter Special Musical Bishōjo Senshi Sailor Moon
    Shin/Henshin – Super Senshi e no Michi (新／変身・スーパー戦士への道)
    Last Dracul Jokyoku (ラストドラクル序曲)
  - 2000 Summer Special Musical Bishōjo Senshi Sailor Moon
    Kessen/Transylvania no Mori (決戦/トランシルバニアの森)
    - Shin Toujou! ChibiMoon o Goru Senshi Tatsu - (～新登場！ちびムーンを護る戦士達～)
  - 2001 Winter Special Musical Bishōjo Senshi Sailor Moon
    Kessen/Transylvania no Mori [Kaiteiban] (決戦／トランシルバニアの森＜改訂版＞)
    -Saikyou no Kataki Dark Cain no Nazo- (－最強の敵 ダーク・カインの謎－)
  - 2001 Spring Special Musical Bishōjo Senshi Sailor Moon
    Last Dracul Saishuu Shou (ラスト・ドラクル最終章)
    Chou Wakusei Death Vulcan no Fuuin/Super Revue Musical Show (超惑星デス・バルカンの封印/スパーレビューミュージカルショー)
- Spider's Nest (30 November 2001 – 9 December 2001 at Tokyo Globe Theater)
- The prosecution witness (2002, Ginza Theatre)
- Musical Forest is Alive (21–29 August 2004) as Queen
- Love Hotels – LOVE×HOTEL (6–16 October 2005)

== Discography ==
=== Singles ===
Title	Year	Peak chart positions	Sales	Album
Title	Year	JPN	Sales	Album
"Taiyō no Rakuen (Promised Land)" (太陽の楽園～Promised Land～)	2003	—	—	Non-album single
"Rainbow Notes"	2003	—	—	Non-album single
"—" denotes releases that did not chart or were not released in that region.

== DVD ==
- Kanbe Miyuki 〜MOON Letter〜 (PONY CANYON, Released 21 June 2000)
- THE COMPLETE Kanbe Miyuki (Released 25 April 2001)
- Metamorphose! (Frontier Works, Released 25 November 2004)
- Amaretto ~Beware~ (Released 20 May 2006)

== Photobooks ==
- I am Rainbow ☆ (Released 25 July 2000) ISBN 4-8470-2575-X
- Navi (Released 30 September 2004) ISBN 4-8124-1846-1

– Digital Photobook

- Kanbe Miyuki @ Digital Photocollection (December 2001)

Preceded by Fumina Hara	Usagi Tsukino/Sailor Moon in the Sailor Moon musicals 2000–2001	Succeeded by Marina Kuroki
