= Fumina Hara =

Japanese actress and gravure idol

Fumina Hara (原 史奈, Hara Fumina; born 22 May 1981 in Tokyo, Japan) is a Japanese actress and gravure idol.

== Biography ==
=== History ===
She has played the role of Usagi Tsukino in the Sailor Moon musicals, and has gone on to a varied career. She has played the love interest in Aishiteruze Baby.

=== Personal life ===
She was married to former football player Tetsuo Nakanishi from 2007 to 2014. In 2015, she remarried to a general man. On 26 December 2024, she gave birth to her first child.

== Filmography ==
- "Gun Crazy 4"
- Maiko Haaaan!!!
- NEO - Office Chuckles (seasons 2-4)
- Twin Spica

=== Dubbing ===
- Cabin Fever - Karen

=== Video game ===
- Finder Love: Fumina Hara - Futari no Futari de... (ファインダーラブ 原史奈 ふたりの ふたりで･･･。, Finder Love: Fumina Hara - Our time together)

Preceded by Anza Oyama	Usagi Tsukino/Sailor Moon in the Sailor Moon musicals 1998-1999	Succeeded by Miyuki Kanbe
