= SawaYan (YouTuber) =

Japanese YouTube group

SAWAYAN サワヤン
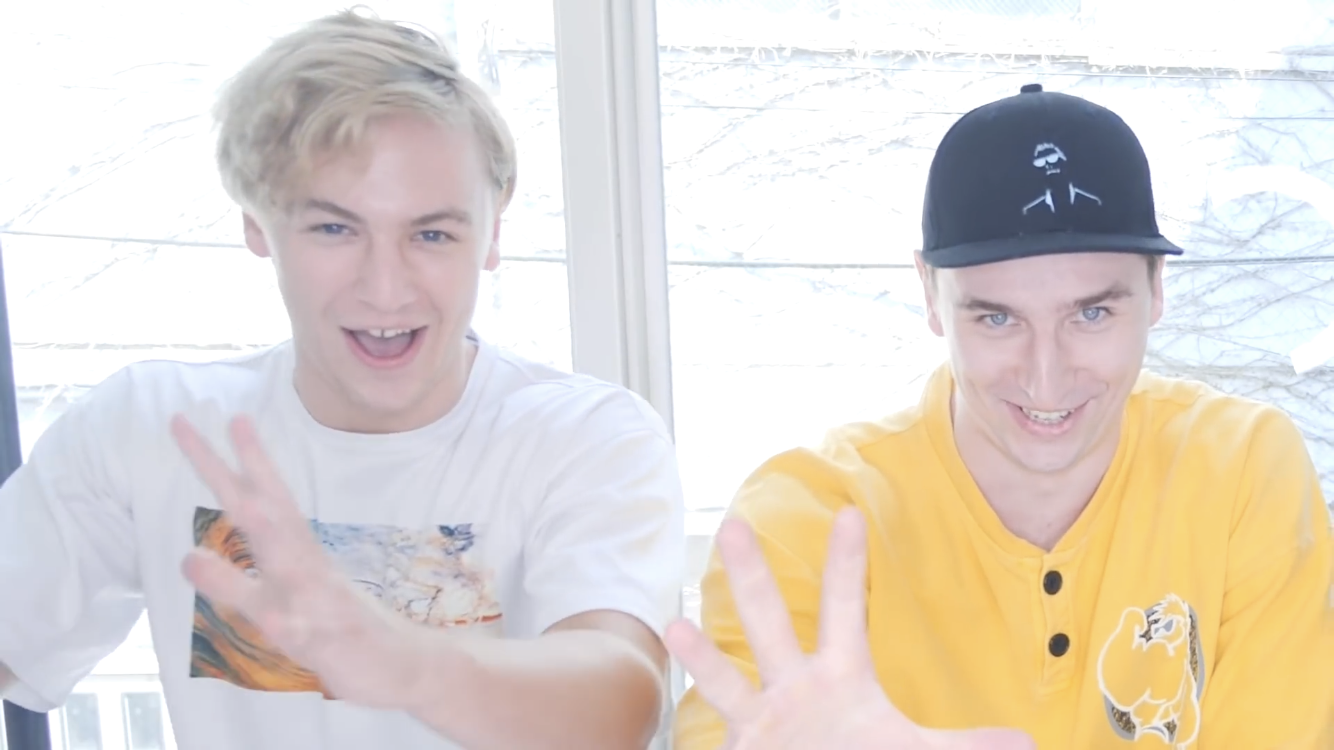
- Tkachov Yan (left) Tkachov Sava (right)
- Born: Sava Tkachov; 14 October 1995 (age 30); Ukraine Yan Tkachov; 14 May 2001 (age 24); Japan

YouTube information
- Channels: SAWAYAN CHANNEL; SAWAYAN GAMES
- Subscribers: 1.71 million (SAWAYAN CHANNEL); 2.03 million (SAWAYAN GAMES)
- Views: 609 million (SAWAYAN CHANNEL); 1.2 billion (SAWAYAN GAMES)
- Last updated: 3 May 2025

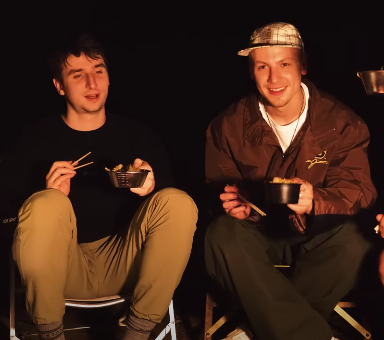
Members Tkachov Sava and Tkachov Yan

SAWAYAN (サワヤン) is a YouTuber group consisting of Tkachov Sava and his brother Tkachov Yan, both Ukrainian nationals living and working in Japan.

== History ==
His older brother, Sava, worked for a company he knew after graduating from college but left after a year and a half; in October 2019, Sava invited his younger brother, Yan, to join him on YouTube and become a YouTuber.

He began posting videos in February 2020, and markets his character as "a foreigner who is highly educated and fluent in Japanese. His main channels are "SAWAYAN CHANNEL," a live-action channel, and "SAWAYAN GAMES," a video game channel.

In February 2022 Russian troops invaded their native Ukraine. In response, Sawa and Jan uploaded a video saying they would volunteer to be volunteer soldiers.

On 5 March Sawa conducted a live distribution on the "SAWAYAN GAMES" channel where all the money thrown was donated to Ukraine.

This distribution raised 3.59 million yen ($25523) in throw-away money and ranked first in the world in Super chat's daily rankings. In a conversation with Mr. Kono, he also mentioned this distribution and stated that he would like to continue these kinds of activities in the future.

On 8 March 2022 he released a video of a conversation with politician Taro Kono, in which he referred to Russian invasion of Ukraine.

On 31 March 2022 he held a press conference at the Foreign Correspondents' Club of Japan in Marunouchi, Tokyo, where he shared his thoughts with his family in his home country, which is under military invasion by Russia.

On 13 February 2023 he traveled to the United States to watch the All-Stars at the invitation of the NBA. However, at the immigration checkpoint at Los Angeles International Airport, Sava had his passport returned without incident, but Yan was taken to a separate room. After a couple of days, Yan was effectively banned from entering the U.S. as he was to return to Japan.

On 16 May 2023 SAWAYAN collaborated for the first time with Japanese YouTuber Hikakin. After eating "Misokin" cup noodles produced by Hikakin together at Hikakin's home, the two made a surprise appearance at the APF GOUKETSU, a Bodybuilder's competition, and served Misokin to the competitors after the competition.

== Member ==
=== Tkachov Sava ===
==== Birth ====
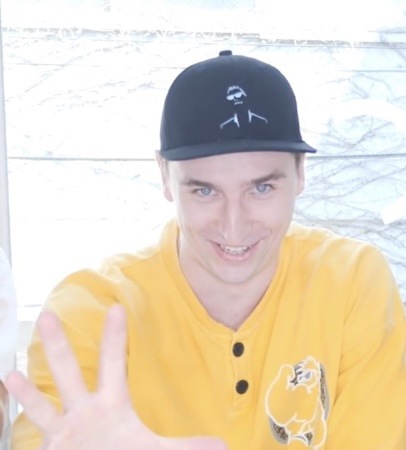
Tkachov Sava

Born on 14 October 1995, in Kyiv, the capital of Ukraine, as the biggest baby (55 cm) in the hospital. 6 years later, on 14 May 2001, his younger brother Tkachov Yan was born.

==== School years ====
He first came to Japan at the age of 4 in Okinawa, and later moved to Koto-ku, Tokyo.

He graduated from Motokaga Elementary School in Koto-ku, Fukagawa Daiichi Junior High School in Koto-ku, Kokugakuin University Kugayama High School, and Keio University. He is also a Basketball Player and was a member of the three-man team TRIANS.EXE since 2019.

=== Tkachov Yan ===
==== Birth ====
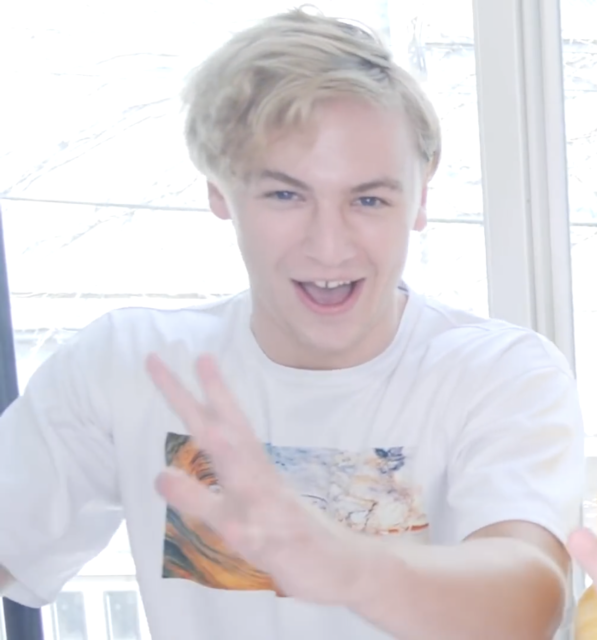
Tkachov Yan

Born on 14 May 2001, in Japan.

==== School years ====
He graduated from Motokaga Elementary School in Koto-ku, Tokyo, and Fukagawa Daiichi Junior High School in Koto-ku, Tokyo.

He went to high school at Kokugakuin University Kugayama High School. He was a member of the basketball team and participated in the Kanto and national tournaments.

For college, he was accepted to Keio University, where he is currently enrolled as of 2022.

He is currently both a YouTuber and a university student.
