= Sailor Moon (character) =

Fictional character from a manga series

- Sailor Moon character
- Usagi in her Super Sailor Moon form as seen in the SuperS series of the 1990s anime
- First appearance: Sailor Moon chapter #1: "Usagi – Sailor Moon" (December 28, 1991)
- Created by: Naoko Takeuchi
- Voiced by (Japanese): Kotono Mitsuishi (eps. 1–43 and 51–200, Sailor Moon Crystal) (1992–2023); Kae Araki (eps. 44–50)
- Voiced by (English): Tracey Moore (1–11, 15, and 21, DiC dub); Terri Hawkes (12–14, 16–20, and 22–82, and movies, DiC and Pioneer dubs); Linda Ballantyne (CWi dub); Stephanie Sheh (ViZ dub)

In-universe information
- Full name: Usagi Tsukino
- Aliases: Princess Serenity (past life name); Neo-Queen Serenity (30th century future self)
- Nickname: Bun/Dumpling/Meatball Head
- Affiliation: Sailor Guardians
- Family: Queen Serenity (mother; in past life); Ikuko Tsukino (mother); Kenji Tsukino (father); Shingo Tsukino (younger brother)
- Spouse: King Endymion (husband)
- Children: Small Lady
- Nationality: Japanese
- Powers and abilities: Generation of damaging energy; Uses the power of Silver Crystal; Healing powers; Teleportation (with fellow Sailor Guardians)

Usagi Tsukino (Japanese: 月野 うさぎ, Hepburn: Tsukino Usagi; renamed Serena in the DiC and Cloverway English adaptations and Bunny in the Mixx/Tokyopop adaptation), better known as Sailor Moon (Japanese: セーラームーン, Hepburn: Sērā Mūn), is a fictional character and the titular protagonist of the Sailor Moon franchise created by Naoko Takeuchi. She is introduced in chapter No. 1 of the manga, "Usagi – Sailor Moon" (originally published in Japan's Nakayoshi magazine on December 28, 1991), as a carefree Japanese schoolgirl who can transform into the magical "Guardian of Love and Justice", Sailor Moon.

One day, Usagi initially meets Luna, a magical talking black cat who is searching for the Moon Princess. Luna reveals that Usagi is destined to save Earth from the forces of evil and gives her a brooch to transform into Sailor Moon. She asks Usagi to locate the other reincarnated Sailor Guardians, find the princess and protect the "Silver Crystal", an item of immense power. After locating her comrades, Usagi later discovers that she is the reincarnation of the Moon Princess, Princess Serenity (プリンセス・セレニティ, Purinsesu Sereniti) and that her former lover, Prince Endymion of Earth has also been reincarnated in the present as the mysterious hero, Tuxedo Mask. As Usagi matures, she becomes a powerful warrior and protects her adopted home planet, Earth, from villains who wish to harm it. Usagi is depicted as usually carefree and cheerful, but with immature tendencies that show themselves when things do not go her way.

Usagi appears in every episode, film, video game, and television special of the anime adaptations, Sailor Moon and Sailor Moon Crystal; as well as the live action adaptation, Pretty Guardian Sailor Moon, with her trademark twin buns with twin pigtails. She also cameos in the sister series Codename: Sailor V. She has been the subject of parodies and has appeared in special events. Usagi's critical reception has been largely positive and she is recognized as one of the most important and popular female superheroes of all time, and a cultural symbol of Japan.

== Conception and creation ==
Usagi and Sailor Moon series evolved from Naoko Takeuchi's earlier one-shot series called Codename: Sailor V. In Takeuchi's first proposal for the Sailor Moon series, each of the five heroines had a unique outfit. It was eventually decided that they would instead wear uniforms based on a single theme, whose design was closest to Sailor Moon's original costume concept. Sailor Moon's original had some small differences, including color changes, an exposed midriff, and ribbons around the gloves and boots. She also had a mask, which did appear in a few chapters of the manga before being discarded. These aspects of Sailor Moon's costume are shown in multiple pieces of early artwork, along with a gun and cloak, which were also parts of the original concept.

Of all the Sailor Guardians, Usagi's personality is closest to Takeuchi's own personality at the time Sailor Moon was created. Takeuchi also based Usagi's signature hairstyle on a "good luck charm" she had during her studies as a university student. Takeuchi would put her hair up in odango before difficult classes or exams. Sailor Moon has pink hair in the initial sketches, but by the intermediate stages of development, Takeuchi planned to have the character's hair be blonde in civilian form and change to silver when she transformed. Her editor, Fumio Osano, told her that silver hair would be too plain for cover art. Despite this, stylistic use of differently colored hair does sometimes appear in later artwork, and the concept of the heroines' hair changing color when transformed is used in Pretty Guardian Sailor Moon.

The kanji of Usagi's surname translate as "moon" (月, tsuki) and "field" (野, no). Her given name is in hiragana usagi (うさぎ) and so its meaning is not inherent, but the word (兎) means "rabbit" and this is used as a pun frequently throughout the series, including her hairstyle and possessions. Her name is structured as a pun, as the syllable "no" indicates a possessive, so her name can also be understood as "Rabbit of the Moon". This derives from a Chinese folktale, popular in Japan, about the rabbit which is said to be visible in the Moon's face, much like the Western Man in the Moon. The Mixx/Tokyopop English-language manga – along with other localisations – gives her the nickname "Bunny" to partially preserve this pun. "Usagi" is not a common given name in Japan.

=== Differences in English and other languages ===
Like other foreign language adaptations, the original North American adaptation of the Sailor Moon anime by DiC and Cloverway took several liberties with the series, changing various aspects and localizing content to fit North American audiences. Among these were renaming Usagi as "Serena", and subsequently referring to Princess Serenity as "Princess Serena." The Sailor Guardians were referred to as "Sailor Scouts" and Sailor Moon's transformations were altered to omit the "Make Up!" phrase. The names of her attacks were also changed. For example, "Moon Tiara Action" was changed to "Moon Tiara Magic", "Moon Healing Escalation" was changed to "Moon Healing Activation" or "Cosmic Moon Power", and "Moon Princess Halation" was changed to "Moon Princess Elimination." In the later seasons, most attacks were maintained according to their original Japanese names and her family name was retained as "Tsukino."

The initial English manga release by Mixx/Tokyopop were made to coincide with the original anime adaptation, so many character names and spellings were kept between the two. However, Usagi's name was changed to "Bunny" to match more closely with her Japanese name's meaning.

Antonia Levi wrote that the two different initial English versions lost some of the meaning behind her name, with the TV version losing the rabbit meaning and the Mixx/Tokyopop name losing the moon meaning.

The initial French, German, and Italian dubs renamed Usagi with rabbit puns. The Cantonese version used the name "Yuet-yeh Toei" (using the characters 月野兔, Jyutping: jyut6 je5 tou3), which Levi stated kept the meaning of the moon and rabbit themes, but "unquestionably changed the heroine's nationality".

== Characterization ==
Usagi is first introduced as living the life of a normal teenage schoolgirl in 20th century Tokyo. Although well-meaning, she is an underachieving, accident-prone crybaby. One day, Usagi encounters a mysterious cat with a crescent moon on its forehead, who later reveals herself to be Luna, a mentor archetype who introduces Usagi to her new heroic role. Luna gives Usagi a magical brooch and explains how to use it to transform into Sailor Moon, the Guardian of Love and Justice; she tells Usagi that she is a Sailor Guardian who must fight for peace and find her reincarnated comrades, the Sailor Guardians, to locate and protect their charge, the Moon Princess and the mysterious and powerful Silver Crystal, from the forces of evil. Usagi is a reluctant heroine at first, but grows more confident and mature over time. She eventually discovers that she is the reincarnation of the Moon Princess, Princess Serenity, from the ancient civilization known as Silver Millennium, and the bearer of the Silver Crystal. She also learns that her lover from her past life, Prince Endymion of Earth, has been reincarnated in the present as well as the hero Tuxedo Mask, and seeks to reunite with him. As Sailor Moon, she sets out with her comrades to fight the villains from her past life and to protect the Earth using the legendary Silver Crystal. This provides most of the conflict, romance, and drama in both the manga and the anime.

Usagi in her school uniform, as drawn by Naoko Takeuchi

As a civilian, Usagi lives in Azabu Jūban with her mother, Ikuko Tsukino; her father, Kenji Tsukino; and her brother, Shingo Tsukino; these names reflect those of Naoko Takeuchi's real-life family members. Usagi and her fellow Guardians have diverse backgrounds, and balance their responsibilities as superheroines with their current lives.

Though Tuxedo Mask's identity is initially hidden from her, his civilian identity is eventually revealed to be Mamoru Chiba, who is later revealed to also be the reincarnation of Princess Serenity's star-crossed lover, Prince Endymion. Finally reunited in the present, Usagi and Mamoru become romantically involved. Mamoru and Usagi's relationship is a significant part of Usagi's personal life, as well as the series as a whole. They date for a long time in the series and the love they share helps her through many challenges. In various adaptations of the series, the two eventually marry, and major plot lines involve discovering that she will become a "Sovereign of the Earth", known as Neo-Queen Serenity, by the 30th century, and give birth to her future daughter, Chibiusa.

Usagi is a glutton, particularly for sweet foods and they easily distract her; the manga lists one of her favorite foods as cake. She also loves playing video games and reading manga. Her favorite subject is listed as home economics. She is said to dislike carrots, and is a poor student in both English and mathematics. She is afraid of dentists, ghosts, and thunder and lightning, and her greatest dream is to someday be a bride. She later becomes a member of the Manga Drawing Club at her school, She stands 150 cm (4 ft 11 in) tall, though her height relative to other characters varies from different design models used in various adaptations.

In the manga and anime, Mamoru refers to her as odango (a kind of rice dumpling), based on her distinctive hairstyle. At first, this is always accompanied with the suffix ‑atama, meaning "head", but this is gradually dropped. Usagi hates the name at first, but it develops into a sign of affection as they become close. Later in the series, Haruka Tenō and Kō Seiya, other important figures in her life, adopt the name as well. Since the term does not always have foreign language equivalents, this moniker is altered in various ways across its many foreign translations and adaptations.

=== Variations ===
Usagi's character is different between versions of the series. In the manga, she starts out as a crybaby, but quickly matures and embraces the responsibilities of her role. Regardless of her maturity as a heroine, the manga often portrays Usagi as lazy or unmotivated in applying herself in her civilian life, such as making fun of her tendency to use phonetic writing instead of more formal script or consistently receiving low academic marks.

The original anime often portrays Usagi as being more childish. She frequently engages in petty squabbles with her friends, usually with Rei, and Chibiusa to the point of developing a friendly rivalry with them or sometimes her little brother Shingo with whom Usagi is not shown getting along and shares a sibling rivalry with. Though she is likewise depicted as deeply caring of those around her, and even of her enemies. Repeated themes in the series depict Usagi feeling sympathy for villains she encounters, and working to help redeem them. Her clumsiness and other slovenly aspects are often highlighted for comedy purposes, both as a civilian and while fighting her enemies. Characters often comment on the unlikeliness of someone with as many graceless qualities like Usagi being a fierce warrior like Sailor Moon, but her lack of grace is simultaneously described as charming to those around her. Usagi's gregarious personality is often emphasized as bringing people together, including her friends and allies.

In the live-action series, Usagi differs slightly from her manga and anime counterparts. She is more outgoing and extroverted, and makes friends very easily. This immediately puts her personality in conflict with the other Sailor Guardians, each of whom is solitary to some degree. She rarely uses formal speech with those of her age (though she does with adults), and refers to everyone as "given name-chan" (which is very informal and a way of expressing closeness). She teases Ami when Ami continues calling her "Tsukino-san" (a formal way of speaking to classmates), saying that it is like they are not friends. Every time a new Sailor Guardian appears, Usagi immediately tries to befriend them, even though almost all of them resist. However, Usagi eventually makes the other Sailor Guardians realize that they are stronger together than alone. Usagi also has a habit of forcing her interests on her new friends. This is prominent in her relationship with Rei, where Usagi repeatedly tries to get Rei to sing.

== Aspects and forms ==
Sailor Moon's planetary symbol

Being a character with a long lifetime (spanning the ancient Silver Millennium era and 30th century), as well as multiple incarnations, special powers and transformations, Usagi has various aliases such as Princess Serenity, Sailor Moon, Princess Sailor Moon, Super Sailor Moon, Eternal Sailor Moon, and Neo-Queen Serenity. In all of her incarnations (barring disguises), Usagi is always depicted with her hair up in twin buns with twin pigtails.

=== Sailor Moon ===
The series often refers to Usagi's Sailor Guardian identity, Sailor Moon, as the "Guardian of Love and Justice", and once as the "Guardian of Mystery". Throughout most of the series, Sailor Moon wears a white and blue sailor fuku uniform; white and reddish‑pink gloves and boots; and crescent‑moon earrings. She also wears red hairpieces and white barrettes resembling feathers, both of which can be used for minor attacks. Her personality is no different from when she is a civilian. Though Usagi has some certain abilities as a civilian by way of her true identity as Sailor Moon, she must transform into Sailor Moon to access the vast array of powers available to her.

The names for Sailor Moon's attacks center around mythology of the Moon, love, healing, and light. She eventually becomes the most powerful Sailor Guardian in the galaxy, but her capacity for caring for others is shown to be more powerful still. As the reincarnation of Princess Serenity, Sailor Moon also wields the immensely powerful Silver Crystal. The origin of the Silver Crystal is inconsistently depicted in the series, described as a family heirloom early on, and later described as a fundamental part of Sailor Moon as a Sailor Guardian. The Silver Crystal is coveted by many of the series' villains for its limitless abilities, and Sailor Moon often uses it throughout the series to defeat the most difficult of villains, typically at the cost of her own vitality.

Sailor Moon's appearance and title change at key points when she grows stronger or gains additional powers. The first major change takes place during the third story arc – act 30 of the manga and episode 111 of the original anime – when she obtains the Holy Grail, an item of vast power, and transforms into the more powerful Super Sailor Moon. In this form, her costume becomes more ornate and her powers are increased. At first she is unable to maintain this form without using the Grail, but she later gains the ability to assume this form permanently. This happens when the mysterious being Pegasus grants both her and Sailor Chibi Moon new transformation brooches – in arc 34 of the manga and in episode 130 of the original anime.

Sailor Moon receives her third and final form at the end of the fourth story arc, as the combined power of the other Sailor Guardians allows her to transform into Eternal Sailor Moon, whom is described in the series as the closest in power to her future self, Neo-Queen Serenity. Her uniform is radically altered, including more ornate details and the addition of two pairs of angelic wings on her back which replace her back bow. In the manga, this final form coincides with the Silver Crystal evolving into the Silver Moon Crystal.

=== Princess Serenity ===
Princess Serenity as seen in the manga. Unlike the anime, Serenity is almost always pictured with silver hair in this version.

Princess Serenity (プリンセス・セレニティ, Purinsesu Serenity) is a past incarnation of Sailor Moon that lived in the Moon Kingdom during the age of Silver Millennium. She was the daughter of Queen Serenity, who ruled Silver Millennium and watched over the Earth. Princess Serenity's guardians and closest friends were Sailor Mercury, Sailor Mars, Sailor Jupiter, and Sailor Venus, who were princesses of their own respective planets that sometimes lived on the Moon. On one of her visits to Earth, she met and fell in love with Endymion, the crown prince of Earth.

During the attack that caused the Moon Kingdom's downfall, Prince Endymion died protecting Serenity. In the manga, she then commits suicide out of grief, while in the original anime, Queen Metalia killed them both. Queen Serenity was able to seal away the evil that had created the attack, but everyone involved was killed. Before her own death, the Queen used the Silver Crystal to give her daughter (and others) another chance at life by reincarnating them in the future, hoping that Endymion and Serenity would be able to find happiness together in their new lives. In the live-action series, it is Princess Serenity herself who destroys the Moon Kingdom with her uncontrolled uses of the Silver Crystal when Endymion was killed during the war between them in the past.

Usagi occasionally takes the form of Princess Serenity during the series, often at climactic moments when more strength is needed than Sailor Moon can usually access. Usagi discovers her identity as a princess in act 9 of the manga, episode 34 of the original anime, and act 25 of the live action series. At climactic moments, Serenity sometimes gains a pair of functioning angelic wings, such as the final episodes of SuperS and Sailor Stars. In the manga, Takeuchi depicts Usagi with white, yellow, and even pink hair, but Princess Serenity is almost always depicted with white hair. In the original anime, Princess Serenity is blond. In the live-action series, Serenity has black hair and brown eyes, just like Usagi, and she wears her hair straight down rather than in pigtails.

While other adaptations of Sailor Moon depict Princess Serenity as gentle and similar to Usagi, the live-action series depicts Princess Serenity as colder and more severe. When she is reawakened and possesses Usagi, her singleminded infatuation with reuniting with Endymion causes her to callously disregard the safety of the other guardians and remorselessly strike down her enemies, not even caring if the Earth is destroyed.

==== Princess Sailor Moon ====
Princess Sailor Moon in Pretty Guardian Sailor Moon

Princess Sailor Moon (プリンセス・セーラームーン, Purinsesu Sērā Mūn) is a powerful combination of Sailor Moon and Princess Serenity that only exists in the live-action series. She is introduced when Usagi is possessed by the spirit of Princess Serenity.

Princess Sailor Moon is not the same person as Usagi and they have completely different personalities. Princess Sailor Moon shows no remorse for the fate of the Four Kings of Heaven and she refers to Mamoru as "Endymion" rather than his civilian name. She is always angry, and has no misgivings about causing death or destruction. In one act, Usagi's friend Naru accidentally gets too close to Princess Sailor Moon and has to be hospitalized as a result.

During a confrontation with her current self as Princess Sailor Moon, Serenity tells Usagi that she would have no qualms about destroying the Earth if Endymion were taken from her again. Usagi pleads with Serenity not to overuse her powers, but Serenity refuses. Afraid that she will eventually destroy the world, Usagi tries to suppress her powers. Usagi's internal conflict forces her to undergo endurance training to keep her powers and Princess Serenity persona at bay. Usagi initially succeeds by avoiding negative thoughts. However, when she is forced to kill a possessed Mamoru, Serenity overcomes Usagi's resistance and transforms into Princess Sailor Moon. Serenity even summons her own minions to fight the other Sailor Guardians to prevent them from stopping her. Princess Sailor Moon successfully destroys the world once again, but Serenity eventually realizes the extent to which she is responsible for this and uses the Silver Crystal to undo the harm she has done.

Princess Sailor Moon has a sword that can deflect enemy attacks or unleash devastating projectiles. The sword also doubles as a harp with invisible strings that Princess Sailor Moon plays while mourning her lost prince. The harp's main power is the ability to heal people and the land. Other than healing powers, the exact effect of playing the harp is unclear, but it often causes her Silver Crystal to feed the power of Queen Metaria, accelerating the devastation of the planet.

As with other characters unique to the live-action series, Takeuchi designed Princess Sailor Moon's outfit. Her sailor outfit is considerably more elaborate than Sailor Moon's, and included a crown, pearls on her gloves, and lace on her skirt.

=== Neo-Queen Serenity ===
During the second story arc, it is revealed that Usagi, as Serenity, will eventually become the queen regnant of a new Silver Millennium called Crystal Tokyo, in the 30th century. This form is called Neo-Queen Serenity (ネオ クイーン セレニティ, Neo Kuin Sereniti) and is first seen in act 16 of the manga and episode 68 of the original anime. Usagi learns that she will be given the title "Sovereign of Earth", and Mamoru will become King Endymion alongside her. It is stated in the anime that she becomes Neo-Queen Serenity after warding off a sixth ice age, though the specifics of this are never discussed.

This incarnation is shown to be more mature than the present day Usagi, though she is still childish in some ways. For example, in episode 104, Chibiusa gives the Sailor Guardians a letter from the future in which the Queen asks them to train her, but the letter is simplistic and contains almost no kanji. In episode 146, Diana says that the King and Queen would sometimes play sick to get out of things. Letters she sends through the Door of Space-Time to Chibiusa are sometimes signed with a drawing of herself (and sometimes King Endymion) instead of a name.

In the manga, Neo-Queen Serenity tells the present-day Sailor Guardians that after she became queen, she lost her power as a Sailor Guardian. In the second arc of the anime she does not transform (into Sailor Moon) even when the others do. However, she is seen showing great powers in a flashback when the King Endymion of the future describes the great feats of Neo-Queen Serenity during the time she brought about peace. Diana likewise describes Eternal Sailor Moon as the one second in power only to Neo-Queen Serenity. She also demonstrates abilities that allow her to rejuvenate the destroyed city of Crystal Tokyo, grant the Sailor Guardians upgraded powers, and provide her past self with an upgraded transformation brooch and weapon, the Spiral Heart Moon Rod.

Neo-Queen Serenity wears an altered version of the dress she wore as a princess. The shoulder pieces are omitted and a large, wing-shaped bow replaces the smaller one of the princess outfit. In the manga, Neo-Queen Serenity's dress is similar to her past form's outfit. She also wears a crown and new earrings. The crescent moon is always visible on her forehead, just as it is with her princess form. Her face and facial expressions are drawn to look more mature than the 20th century Usagi, but her iconic hairstyle is retained.

This form is the one that Chibiusa considers as truly being her mother, while she sees the Usagi of the past as a sister figure.

=== Sailor Cosmos ===
In the manga and Crystal, Chibi-Chibi is a young girl who arrives in the present from the future who turns out to be the ultimate future form of Sailor Moon, named Sailor Cosmos (セーラーコスモス, Sērā Kosumosu), in disguise. Cosmos is depicted with flowing white hair in heart-shaped hair buns and pigtails, a winged staff, a simplified white sailor fuku and miniskirt with multicolored ribbons, high heel shoes, gold details, and a flowing, white cape.

Cosmos comes from a future which has been destroyed by the battle with Sailor Chaos; after ages of fighting, she despairs and flees to the past as Chibi-Chibi to aid Eternal Sailor Moon in her fight against Sailor Galaxia and to encourage Sailor Moon to destroy the Galaxy Cauldron altogether, ensuring Chaos' destruction. However, Sailor Moon protests after realizing that if the Cauldron is destroyed, no more stars will be born, leaving the Galaxy without a future. Sailor Moon chooses to sacrifice herself to the Cauldron and seal Chaos away, which Cosmos realizes to have been the right decision. Reminded of the strength and courage she needs to have, Cosmos returns to the future with new hope. After the end of the anime adaptation, Takeuchi commented that she wished Cosmos had been used in Sailor Moon Sailor Stars.

== Abilities ==
In most adaptations, Usagi can transform into a Sailor Guardian by wearing a special device (usually a brooch or compact) and shouting a special command that activates the device. Her original transformation command is "Moon Prism Power, Make Up!" (ムーンプリズムパワー、メイクアップ!, Mūn Purizumu Pawā, Meiku Appu!). (Note: In the DIC and Cloverway dubs, she does not say "Make up" when transforming.) She gains a new basic transformation sequence for each of the five major story arcs. Later in the series, Sailor Moon is able to transform into more powerful forms through the use of items like the Holy Grail or through the combined powers of the other Sailor Guardians.

Most of the anime adaptations' transformation sequences involve the use of shiny red or pink ribbons that fly out of her brooch and form her uniform. Feathers and wings also figure prominently in some sequences, particularly the transformation into Eternal Sailor Moon.

As the protagonist, Usagi has the most special powers of any character in the series. She often uses magical objects for her attacks, such as her tiara or various rods and wands. In the anime, following her attacks' themes of the Moon or love, her attacks are often depicted as firing crescent moon-shaped or heart-shaped energy projectiles at her enemies. While her attacks in the manga tend to simply destroy her enemies, the original anime frequently depicts her attacks as purifying her enemies, restoring possessed victims or objects to their original states of being.

Her physical attacks, usually one-offs and not always successful, include the occasional use of her hair pins as projectile weapons. One of her techniques is the comedic "Ultrasonic Wave" (超音波, chō onpa; "super sound waves"), which involves using the red shields on her hair buns to amplify her loud crying.

=== Silver Crystal ===
The Legendary Silver Crystal (｢幻の銀水晶｣, Maboroshi no Ginzuishō; lit. 'Phantom Silver Crystal') is a magical crystal that only the members of the Moon Kingdom royal lineage can use. The search for the crystal and subsequent attempts to acquire it form the basis of major conflict throughout the entire series.

The Silver Crystal possesses tremendous power, capable of reviving an entire world from ruin and extending the natural lifespan of all people under its protection. Sailor Galaxia describes its regenerative power as unlimited. In the anime, however, the strain of using such power often costs the user her life. The anime shows this happening first when Queen Serenity uses it in the past, again when Sailor Moon defeats Queen Metaria, and again in the Sailor Moon R: The Movie. Other depictions show using the crystal to be taxing, rather than fatal. In the manga, no such claim is made about using the Silver Crystal. In both the manga and anime, the Silver Crystal is described as following the heart of its wielder, to the point of either becoming too powerful in the midst of Usagi's confusion, or as inert as a glass bead with her indecision. In the anime, the Silver Crystal was placed on Sailor Moon's Moon Stick to increase the power of her "Moon Healing Escalation" attack. However, Queen Beryl stated that Sailor Moon could not unlock the full potential of the Silver Crystal because she had not awakened as a "full-fledged princess" yet.

All adaptations portray the Silver Crystal as possibly the single most powerful artifact in the universe, able to focus the energy of its wielder to perform magnificent feats. However, several artifacts rival it in strength, including the Malefic Black Crystal of the Death Phantom, and Sailor Galaxia's Lazurite Crystal. Saphir describes the Silver Crystal as a fearsome item, working across time and space. In the manga, the Silver Crystal is described as so powerful that the present and future versions of it coming into contact with each other could destroy everything.

Because Chibiusa comes from the future – having eventually inherited the Silver Crystal from Usagi – two versions of it exist in the series. After the first and second story arcs, the owners of the crystals keep them in their respective transformation brooches and only remove them in times of urgent need. The crystal is depicted in a variety of forms: spherical, in the initial anime appearance, and a rounded tear drop in the manga. It later takes a heart shape while stored in her brooch in the anime, and also appears in a petaled flower shape in various adaptations, including when it evolves into the Silver Moon Crystal form.

As her Sailor Crystal, the Silver Crystal also gives Sailor Moon the ability to be reborn again and again. So long as a Sailor Guardian's Sailor Crystal remains, their physical forms can be regenerated across numerous incarnations.

=== As Sailor Cosmos ===
Sailor Cosmos is described in the manga as a distant future incarnation of Sailor Moon. Her powers are vast, able to transport people across time and space, construct strong protective barriers, and repel villains like Sailor Galaxia, while restoring destroyed environments. Sailor Cosmos comments that Eternal Sailor Moon's actions in the final battle using the combined power of all Sailor Crystals throughout the galaxy is the Cosmos Crystal's true power, called "Lambda Power", which is able to restore all things to their original forms. Figuratively, Sailor Cosmos describes her past self, Eternal Sailor Moon, as the true embodiment of Sailor Cosmos for her final act of courage, as opposed to herself, who fled her own timeline after losing faith in her unceasing battle against Sailor Chaos.

== Portrayals in media ==
In the Japanese version of every Sailor Moon anime series and subsequent related media, Usagi has been voiced by Kotono Mitsuishi. For this role, Mitsuishi used a higher voice than her natural one. During recording sessions of the early episodes, Mitsuishi had to mentally prepare herself to play Usagi. While Mitsuishi was away during production of episodes 44–50, Kae Araki (who would later voice Usagi's own future daughter, Chibiusa) voiced Usagi as a stand-in. Mitsuishi would later reprise her role in Sailor Moon Crystal, the only actress from the original cast to do so.

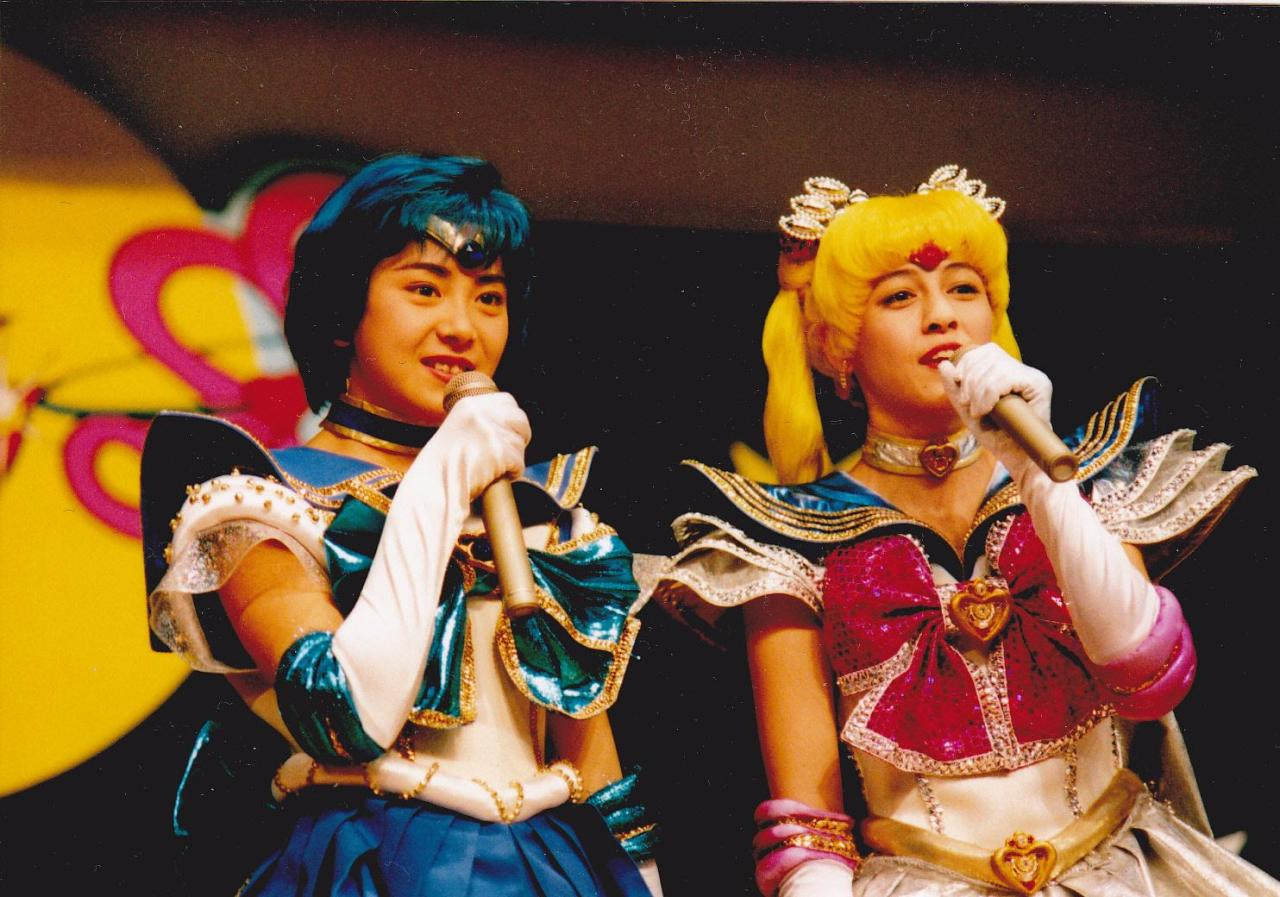
Anza Ohyama (right) portraying Sailor Moon in a musical

In DIC Entertainment's English dub of Sailor Moon (produced in association with Optimum Productions), Sailor Moon was voiced by Tracey Moore for the first 14 episodes (edited down to 11) after which Terri Hawkes took over as the voice for the remaining episodes of the DiC produced dub, as well as Pioneer's dub for the three films, though Moore would return to voice the character in two more episodes later on in the first season. Linda Ballantyne was the voice of Sailor Moon in Cloverway's dub of episodes 83–159 of Sailor Moon (produced in association with Optimum Productions). When Ballantyne first recorded the series, Ballantyne attempted to emulate Hawkes, but soon found it difficult to perform. She wanted the character to "have a lot more fun and just be a goofy teenager." Ballantyne cited her performance as "just more flighty.... Until of course the world needed to be saved." American singer Jennifer Cihi provided the English vocals for the character's songs in the first English adaptation. Stephanie Sheh provides the voice in Viz Media's dub of the entire original Sailor Moon series (produced in association with Studiopolis), and also Sailor Moon Crystal.

In the stage musicals, Usagi has been played by 16 actresses: Anza Ohyama, Fumina Hara, Miyuki Kanbe (who played the character with a "cute and high voice"), Marina Kuroki, Satomi Ōkubo, Hotaru Nomoto, Sayuri Inoue, Mizuki Yamashita, Shiori Kubo, Kanae Yumemiya, Natsuki Koga, Tomomi Kasai, Riko Tanaka, Nagi Inoue, Satsuki Sugawara and Yui Yokoyama. In the SuperS Musicals, Sanae Kimura, who played Sailor Uranus, provided the voice of Neo-Queen Serenity during Over the Moon, a duet between Sailor Moon and Neo-Queen Serenity. A third, unknown person, was on stage in Serenity's costume while both Sailor Moon and Uranus were onstage. Uncredited body doubles are common in the musicals to allow the character to appear to transform instantly.

In Pretty Guardian Sailor Moon, Usagi was portrayed by Miyuu Sawai.

In Sailor Moon Cosmos, Sailor Cosmos is voiced by Keiko Kitagawa. In the musicals, Sailor Cosmos is portrayed by Satomi Okubo, who had also portrayed Usagi from 2013 to 2015.

== Reception and legacy ==
Sheila Rose Browning describes Sailor Moon as "one of the most popular and well-known manga characters in Japan". Usagi influenced the hairstyle and personality of Misato Katsuragi from Neon Genesis Evangelion, and of Gruier Serenity's anime version from Bodacious Space Pirates. Sailor Moon was ranked 9th on IGN's "Top 25 Anime Characters of All Time", being the highest-ranking female character in the list. During the 2020 Olympics, Sailor Moon was selected as one of nine internationally recognized anime and manga characters to serve as Tokyo's mascot ambassadors. Rebecca Silverman, writing about the 2011 re-release of the Sailor Moon manga, felt that Usagi's initial hesitancy about whether she is good enough to be Sailor Moon added authenticity to her claim of being an "ordinary girl". Silverman states that along with the characters in Itazura na Kiss and Marmalade Boy, Usagi gave rise to an "unintelligent heroine" character type, but feels that even in the first volume, Usagi's determination sets her apart.

== In popular culture ==
Comedian Samantha Bee portrayed Sailor Moon in a live-action production at the Canadian National Exhibition.

Spider-Man: Into the Spider-Verse production designer Justin Thompson portrayed Peni Parker / SP//dr in the 2018 film in an art style inspired by that of Sailor Moon, the video game Marvel Contest of Champions also directly depicting a Sailor Moon-based magical girl Peni from Earth-23.

The Shopkins episode, "Look Within", features a reference to Sailor Moon's original transformation scene with Lippy Lips (shown to transform into her 'Wild Style'.)

At the 2022 WWE Royal Rumble, Sasha Banks entered in an outfit inspired by Sailor Moon.

=== Internet memes ===
A social media challenge on Twitter called the #sailormoonredraw gained popularity in May 2020. Artists use a still frame of Sailor Moon taken during the episode "A Bright Shooting Star! Saturn, and the Messiah" from the third season of the original Sailor Moon television series, Sailor Moon S, and redraw it in different styles or have another fictional character take her place. A similar phenomenon occurred back in April 2014 six years prior, in the form a humorous online comic with scenes the series premiere of the original television series, "The Crybaby Usagi's Magnificent Transformation!", set right after Sailor Moon's first battle with the Youma Morga and Tuxedo Mask's first intervention which originated from Tumblr.

== See also ==
- List of superheroines
- Moon in art and literature
- Selene
- Portrayal of women in comics
- Women warriors in literature and culture
- Miyamoto Usagi
- Wonder Woman
- Harley Quinn
- Moon Knight
