= Sailor Moon Cosmos =

2023 two-part film by Tomoya Takahashi

- Theatrical release poster
- Japanese: 劇場版「美少女戦士セーラームーンCosmos(コスモス)」
- Literal meaning: Pretty Guardian Sailor Moon Cosmos The Movie
- Revised Hepburn: Gekijōban Bishōjo Senshi Sērā Mūn Kosumosu
- Directed by: Tomoya Takahashi
- Screenplay by: Kazuyuki Fudeyasu
- Based on: Sailor Moon by Naoko Takeuchi
- Produced by: Hideharu Gomi; Seira Takano
- Starring: Kotono Mitsuishi; Kenji Nojima; Misato Fukuen; Hisako Kanemoto; Rina Satō; Ami Koshimizu; Shizuka Itō; Junko Minagawa; Sayaka Ohara; Ai Maeda; Yukiyo Fujii; Nana Mizuki; Marina Inoue; Saori Hayami; Ayane Sakura; Megumi Hayashibara
- Cinematography: Takashi Yanagida
- Edited by: Keiko Onodera
- Music by: Yasuharu Takanashi
- Production companies: Toei Animation; Studio Deen
- Distributed by: Toei Company, Ltd.
- Release dates: June 9, 2023 (Part 1); June 30, 2023 (Part 2)
- Running time: 160 minutes (total, 80 minutes per film)
- Country: Japan
- Language: Japanese

Sailor Moon Cosmos (Note: Also known as Pretty Guardian Sailor Moon Cosmos The Movie (Japanese: 劇場版「美少女戦士セーラームーンCosmos(コスモス)」, Hepburn: Gekijōban Bishōjo Senshi Sērā Mūn Kosumosu)) is a 2023 Japanese two-part animated action fantasy film directed by Tomoya Takahashi and written by Kazuyuki Fudeyasu based on the Stars arc of the Sailor Moon manga by Naoko Takeuchi, who also serves as a chief supervisor. Co-produced by Toei Animation and Studio Deen, and distributed by Toei Company, Cosmos is a direct sequel to Sailor Moon Eternal (2021) and serves as the "fifth and final season" in the Sailor Moon Crystal anime series. The two-part film stars Kotono Mitsuishi as the voice of Sailor Moon and Chibi-Chibi alongside Kenji Nojima, Misato Fukuen, Hisako Kanemoto, Rina Satō, Ami Koshimizu, Shizuka Itō, Junko Minagawa, Sayaka Ohara, Ai Maeda, Yukiyo Fujii, Nana Mizuki, Marina Inoue, Saori Hayami, Ayane Sakura, and Megumi Hayashibara. Cosmos was released in Japan in June 2023, with the first film on the 9th, and the second film on the 30th.

Netflix acquired the rights for the two-part film, and released it worldwide on August 22, 2024.

== Plot ==
=== Part One ===
Months after defeating the Dead Moon Circus, (Note: As depicted in the second part of Sailor Moon Eternal (2021).) Usagi Tsukino and her friends continue to live peaceful lives as ordinary high school students in the Azabu-Jūban district of Minato, Tokyo. Mamoru Chiba, Usagi's boyfriend, plans to study abroad in the United States. At the airport, Mamoru gives Usagi a ring, but before he can propose, he is suddenly killed by the mysterious Sailor Galaxia, who steals his Golden Crystal and disappears. Unwilling to comprehend Mamoru's death, Usagi believes he boarded his plane and left. After bidding Chibiusa farewell, as she returns to the 30th century, Usagi and her friends attend a concert headlined by popular idol group Three Lights, composed of Kō Seiya, Kō Taiki, and Kō Yaten. During the concert, Sailor Iron Mouse, a Sailor Animamate and member of Shadow Galactica, an empire ruled by Sailor Galaxia and devoted to stealing Sailor Crystals across the galaxy, attacks. The Eternal Sailor Guardians are saved by the Sailor Starlights, a trio of Sailor Guardians from another star system. They realize that the Starlights are the Three Lights, but remain unsure of their motives. Meanwhile, a mysterious child named Chibi-Chibi arrives at Usagi's home, and Usagi and her friends presume she may be related to Chibiusa and accept her presence.

Usagi is disappointed when she fails to hear from Mamoru, and is surprised when the Three Lights enroll at her high school. Meeting Seiya, she learns that the Starlights are searching for their princess, who fled to Earth when Galaxia attacked their planet. They are ambushed by Sailor Aluminum Siren, who kills Sailors Jupiter and Mercury and takes their Sailor Crystals, before being defeated by the Starlights. While Usagi is comforted by Chibi-Chibi, Minako and Rei decide to confront the Starlights to ascertain their motives, and afterward, confront another attacker, Sailor Lead Crow. Lead Crow kills Phobos and Deimos, revealing that the Sailor Animamates are survivors of planets destroyed by Galaxia who have been granted powers of Sailor Guardians. Sailor Moon defeats her, but Sailors Venus and Mars are killed by Galaxia and their crystals are stolen. Their deaths cause Usagi to remember the truth of Mamoru's death.

In the 30th century, Chibiusa notices time distortions affecting the future, but is told to remain by Neo Queen Serenity. In the present, the Starlights notice an incense burner in Chibi-Chibi's possession and discover that it houses their princess, Princess Kakyuu. She emerges, having healed her body, and reveals that Chibi-Chibi is a Sailor Guardian as well. Another of the Sailor Animamates, Sailor Tin Nyanko, attacks Usagi, severely injuring Luna, Artemis, and Diana. They are rescued by the Starlights, who take Usagi to meet Princess Kakyuu. Kakyuu warns Usagi that Sailor Galaxia seeks to control the galaxy by obtaining the Sailor Crystals, especially Usagi's Silver Moon Crystal. On her way home, Usagi encounters Galaxia, who attacks and overwhelms her, but Chibi-Chibi's intervention forces Galaxia to retreat. In her palace, Galaxia reflects on seeking a star worthy of her power and discovering Chaos, an immense embodiment of evil at the center of the galaxy.

Usagi resolves to confront Galaxia in order to regain her friends' Sailor Crystals and restore them to life. Concerned that Sailors Uranus, Neptune, Pluto, and Saturn, who have gone to their respective home bases, may be in danger, she asks for Kakyuu and the Starlights' assistance.

=== Part Two ===
Neo Queen Serenity reveals to Chibiusa that the Sailor Guardians are being killed in the past. Chibiusa, joined by the Sailor Quartet, transforms to go help Sailor Moon. Sailor Moon, Kakyuu, the Starlights, and Chibi-Chibi travel to the Outer Guardians' respective home bases, but learn that they have already been killed. They head to Galaxia's base and encounter Sailors Lethe and Mnemosyne. Lethe kills Luna, Artemis, and Diana, blaming the Silver Moon Crystal for causing conflict as she and Mnemosyne reluctantly joined Galaxia after she destroyed their planets. Mnemosyne stops Lethe from killing Sailor Moon, but Sailor Moon asks Lethe to kill her if it will truly bring peace to the galaxy. Lethe, shocked by her earnestness, relents, but Galaxia's henchmen, Sailors Phi and Chi, show up and kill Lethe and Mnemosyne for their disobedience before also killing the Starlights. After convincing Kakyuu they can bring the Starlights back by regaining their Sailor Crystals, they are ambushed by the last of the Animamates, Sailor Heavy Metal Papillon, but are saved by the sudden arrival of Sailor Chibi Moon and the Sailor Quartet. Sailor Moon reunites with Chibi Moon, who assumes that Sailor Moon teleported them to her, but both she and Kakyuu say it was not them, leaving them to speculate if it was Chibi-Chibi.

Sailors Phi and Chi appear again and are defeated, but Kakyuu is fatally wounded and dies during the battle. They are suddenly attacked by the revived Eternal Sailor Guardians and Tuxedo Mask, who are being controlled by Galaxia bracelets. The Sailor Quartet are incapacitated and Chibi-Chibi urges Chibi Moon not to interfere, causing her to question who Chibi-Chibi truly is. Reluctantly, Sailor Moon defeats her friends and arrives at Galaxia's chambers, where they battle. Galaxia flees to the true center of the galaxy: the Galaxy Cauldron, source of all life in the Milky Way. She throws the Sailor Crystals and Tuxedo Mask into the Cauldron, erasing them—and by extension, Chibi Moon—from existence. In doing so, she hopes Sailor Moon's powers will overload from grief and destroy Chaos, which lurks in the Cauldron, thereby leaving her as the sole ruler of the galaxy. Chaos merges with the Cauldron and injures Galaxia, planning to take the Silver Moon Crystal and rule the galaxy. It reveals that all of Sailor Moon's previous enemies were incarnations of itself, (Note: Queen Metaria, Death Phantom, and Pharaoh 90, the main villains depicted in Sailor Moon Crystal (2014–16), and Queen Nehelenia from Sailor Moon Eternal (2021).) and that light and darkness were both born from the Cauldron.

Galaxia realizes the futility of her plan and Sailor Moon despairs that everything she loves is now gone. They contemplate if Chaos winning will bring lasting peace to the galaxy, but Chibi-Chibi urges Sailor Moon to destroy Chaos by destroying the Cauldron. Sailor Moon protests, as destroying the Cauldron will prevent new life from being born in the galaxy. Chibi-Chibi reveals that the galaxy will be spared endless future battles between light and darkness if she destroys the Cauldron now. Galaxia posits that new life could still appear elsewhere and give birth to conflict again. Sailor Moon is heartened by this, realizing that life will always include both joy and sorrow. Galaxia is awed by Sailor Moon, but her bracelets shatter and she dies. Sailor Moon urges Chibi-Chibi not to give up hope, and Chibi-Chibi reveals her true form: Sailor Cosmos. Sailor Moon dives into the Cauldron, calling upon all the Sailor Crystals in the Cauldron to lend her their power. Chaos is defeated and melts into the Cauldron along with Sailor Moon.

The Cauldron resets and revitalizes the Sailor Crystals, returning them to their home planets. Sailor Cosmos informs the revived Sailor Quartet that this restoration is the "Lambda Power" from all the Sailor Crystals joining together to form the Cosmos Crystal. The Quartet wonder if she is a future form of Sailor Moon, and she confirms that she is from the distant future. She explains that in her time, Chaos reemerged as the unbeatable Sailor Chaos. Cosmos fled to the past, believing she could avoid the devastating losses of battle by guiding her past self to destroy the Cauldron before Sailor Chaos emerged. However, Sailor Moon's final act of courage has restored her resolve to fight on. She returns the Sailor Quartet to the 30th century before returning to her own time. Inside the Cauldron, Usagi reunites with Mamoru, her friends, and Chibiusa, who returns to her own time. The guardian of the Cauldron, Guardian Cosmos, appears and asks Usagi if she wishes to start a new life for all of them, but she wishes for them to continue their current lives. Guardian Cosmos sends them back to Earth, informing her that Chaos is gone, but may one day reemerge. On Earth, Usagi reunites with her family and Luna.

Some time in the future, Mamoru and Usagi marry, pledging their fidelity to each other, their friends, and their mission to guard the Earth. Mamoru reflects that even if they all disappear one day, Sailor Moon will forever shine as the brightest, most beautiful star.

== Voice cast ==
Character	Japanese voice cast	English voice cast
Usagi Tsukino/Eternal Sailor Moon	Kotono Mitsuishi	Stephanie Sheh
Luna	Ryō Hirohashi	Michelle Ruff
Mamoru Chiba/Tuxedo Mask	Kenji Nojima	Robbie Daymond
Ami Mizuno/Eternal Sailor Mercury	Hisako Kanemoto	Kate Higgins
Rei Hino/Eternal Sailor Mars	Rina Satō	Cristina Valenzuela
Makoto Kino/Eternal Sailor Jupiter	Ami Koshimizu	Amanda C. Miller (Note: Credited as Bennett Abara)
Minako Aino/Eternal Sailor Venus	Shizuka Itō	Cherami Leigh
Artemis	Taishi Murata	Johnny Yong Bosch
Chibiusa/Eternal Sailor Chibi Moon	Misato Fukuen	Sandy Fox
Diana	Shoko Nakagawa	Debi Derryberry
Setsuna Meioh/Eternal Sailor Pluto	Ai Maeda	Veronica Taylor
Haruka Tenoh/Eternal Sailor Uranus	Junko Minagawa	Erica Mendez
Michiru Kaioh/Eternal Sailor Neptune	Sayaka Ohara	Lauren Landa
Hotaru Tomoe/Eternal Sailor Saturn	Yukiyo Fujii	Christine Marie Cabanos
Kō Seiya/Sailor Star Fighter	Marina Inoue	Melissa Hutchison
Kō Taiki/Sailor Star Maker	Saori Hayami	Erika Harlacher
Kō Yaten/Sailor Star Healer	Ayane Sakura	Sarah Anne Williams
Princess Kakyuu/Sailor Kakyuu	Nana Mizuki	Allegra Clark
Chibi-Chibi/Sailor Chibi-Chibi Moon	Kotono Mitsuishi	Stephanie Sheh
Sailor Cosmos	Keiko Kitagawa	Stephanie Sheh
Chaos	Mitsuki Saiga	Kari Wahlgren
Sailor Galaxia	Megumi Hayashibara	Carrie Keranen
Sailor Iron Mouse	Sena Koizumi	Katie Leigh
Sailor Aluminum Siren	Ayumu Murase	Faye Mata
Sailor Lead Crow	Yōko Hikasa	Debi Mae West
Sailor Tin Nyanko	Mariya Ise	Corina Boettger
Sailor Heavy Metal Papillon	Haruka Kudō	Amanda Lee
Sailor Lethe	Shiori Mikami	Risa Mei
Sailor Mnemosyne	Kanae Itō	Megan Taylor Harvey
Sailor Phi	Fumie Mizusawa	Lisa Ortiz
Sailor Chi	Yuka Komatsu	Amber Lee Connors

Additional voice cast includes:

Character	Japanese voice cast	English voice cast
Ikuko Tsukino	Wakana Yamazaki	Tara Platt
Kenji Tsukino	Mitsuaki Madono	Keith Silverstein
Shingo Tsukino	Seira Ryū	Nicolas Roye
Ittō Asanuma	Daisuke Sakaguchi	Matthew Mercer
Phobos	Kanami Taguchi	Xanthe Huynh
Deimos	Aya Yamane	Kelly Baskin
Saphir	Tsubasa Yonaga	Greg Felden
Wiseman	Hiroshi Iwasaki	Steve Kramer
Sailor Ceres	Reina Ueda	Cassandra Lee Morris
Sailor Pallas	Sumire Morohoshi	Xanthe Huynh
Sailor Juno	Yuko Hara	Erika Ishii
Sailor Vesta	Rie Takahashi	Erica Lindbeck
Guardian Cosmos	Keiko Kitagawa	Stephanie Sheh

== Production ==
=== Development ===
The sequel was first teased at the end of the second film of Sailor Moon Eternal. In April 2022, it was announced that the sequel covering the Stars arc of the manga was to be produced as a two-part anime film project, titled Pretty Guardian Sailor Moon Cosmos The Movie (劇場版「美少女戦士セーラームーンCosmos(コスモス)」, Gekijōban Bishōjo Senshi Sērā Mūn Kosumosu). Majority of key staff members from Eternal two-part film returned, with Kazuyuki Fudeyasu writing the screenplay, Kazuko Tadano designing the characters, and original creator and mangaka Naoko Takeuchi chief supervising the films' production, while Tomoya Takahashi served as a director for Cosmos. Studio Deen will also continue to co-animate and produce the films with Toei Animation.

In an interview with director Tomoya Takahashi and producers Hideharu Gomi and Seira Takano, Takano revealed that the production started during COVID-19 pandemic, and as she was searching for new directors at the time, majority of the Studio Deen staff members highly recommended Tomoya Takahashi to direct the film. Both producers also stated that even though Cosmos served as a conclusion to the Sailor Moon Crystal series overall, Takahashi was given much more freedom from the producers than the previous directors, and thus taking the opportunity to include visual homages to the Sailor Moon franchise; the manga and the 1990s anime series, as well as the 2003 live-action series.

In the visual book interview, screenwriter Kazuyuki Fudeyasu found the writing process interesting, as in Eternal, it was about friends coming together one by one, while Cosmos was the opposite, losing friends one after the other. He also added a scene before the credits that makes an homage to the very first chapter of the manga. Character designer Kazuko Tadano noted that she had the same feeling with Eternal, where everything felt fresh for her, since there were so many new characters that she had never designed before.

=== Casting ===
The main voice cast from Sailor Moon Crystal and Eternal reprised their respective roles, and had already recorded their lines for the first film prior to the announcement. Kotono Mitsuishi, the voice of Usagi Tsukino/Sailor Moon, confirmed that Cosmos will mark her final performance as the titular character.

In January 2023, it was announced that Marina Inoue, Saori Hayami, and Ayane Sakura have been cast as Kō Seiya/Sailor Star Fighter, Kō Taiki/Sailor Star Maker, and Kō Yaten/Sailor Star Healer respectively. That same month, it was announced that Megumi Hayashibara, who previously voiced Himeko Nayotake in Sailor Moon S: The Movie (1994), was cast as Sailor Galaxia, with Nana Mizuki as Princess Kakyuu, while Kotono Mitsuishi would reprise her role as Chibi-Chibi. In May 2023, the rest of the Shadow Galactica cast was announced, with Yuka Komatsu and Fumie Mizusawa as Sailor Chi and Sailor Phi, Shiori Mikami and Kanae Itō as Sailor Lethe and Sailor Mnemosyne, and Sena Koizumi, Ayumu Murase, Yōko Hikasa, Mariya Ise, and Haruka Kudō as the Sailor Animamates: Sailor Iron Mouse, Sailor Aluminum Siren, Sailor Lead Crow, Sailor Tin Nyanko, and Sailor Heavy Metal Papillon respectively.

In June 2023, it was revealed that Japanese actress Keiko Kitagawa, who previously portrayed Rei Hino/Sailor Mars in the 2003 live-action series, was cast as Sailor Cosmos. Kitagawa was offered by the director and producers after deciding that the character should not be voiced by Mitsuishi, due to the character's solemn nature. She questioned at first, because of the character being "an ultimate form of Sailor Moon from the future", and that it should've been given to her former co-star Miyuu Sawai (who've portrayed Usagi Tsukino/Sailor Moon in the live-action series), but took the offer after discussing with her former castmates, whom unanimously told her to take it.

=== Music ===
Yasuharu Takanashi returned to compose the music for the two-part film. The theme song for the two-part film is titled "Moon Flower" (月の花, Tsuki no Hana), sung by Daoko. The five-track theme song collection album, titled Pretty Guardian Sailor Moon Cosmos The Movie Theme Song Collection, was released on June 30, 2023, which included the opening songs, "Moonlight Legend" (ムーンライト伝説, Mūnraito Densetsu), sung by Eternal Sailor5Guardians (Note: The main voice actresses for the Inner Sailor Guardians: Kotono Mitsuishi (as Eternal Sailor Moon), Hisako Kanemoto (as Eternal Sailor Mercury), Rina Satō (as Eternal Sailor Mars), Ami Koshimizu (as Eternal Sailor Jupiter) and Shizuka Itō (as Eternal Sailor Venus).) (first film) and "Sailor Star Song" (セーラースターソング, Sērā Sutā Songu), sung by Nana Mizuki (as Sailor Kakyuu), Marina Inoue (as Sailor Star Fighter), Saori Hayami (as Sailor Star Maker) and Ayane Sakura (as Sailor Star Healer) (second film), an In-Universe song, "To the Shooting Star" (流れ星へ, Nagareboshi he), sung by voice actresses of Three Lights and the finale song, "Happy Marriage Song", sung by main voice cast of 10 Sailor Guardians and Mamoru Chiba (Kenji Nojima). A new song by Three Lights, titled "Star Line", was released alongside the two-part film's Blu-ray release in December 2023.

== Release ==
=== Japanese release ===
The two-part film was released in theaters in Japan in June 2023, with the first film on the 9th, and the second film on 30th. The Japanese Blu-ray and DVD was released on December 20, 2023.

=== International release ===
The two-part film was also screened in Shanghai International Film Festival in June 2023, as part of "SIFF Special: Toei Animation" line-up. In June 2024, it was announced that Netflix acquired the streaming rights for the two-part film, and it was released worldwide on August 22, 2024.

== Reception ==
The first film failed to make it into top 10 in the Japanese box office in its opening weekend, but it ranked second on Filmmarks' first-day satisfaction ranking with an average rating of 3.85/5.0 based on 139 reviews. The second film debuted at number 9 in the top 10 in its opening weekend.

Rebecca Silverman of Anime News Network gave the two-part film a B+ rating, and stated "The ending is both emotional and cathartic, bringing the story to a close that doesn't feel too final[…]but overall, this is a fitting way to end the reboot of one of the most influential magical girl series: with hope."
