= Sailor Saturn =

Character in Sailor Moon

- Sailor Moon character
- Sailor Saturn in her standard Sailor form holding her Silence Glaive, as drawn by Naoko Takeuchi
- First appearance: Sailor Moon chapter 27: "Infinity 1 – Premonition" (1994) (Hotaru's full debut); Sailor Moon chapter 37: "Infinity 11- Judgement" (1995) (Sailor Saturn's full debut)
- Created by: Naoko Takeuchi
- Voiced by: Japanese: Yūko Minaguchi; Yukiyo Fujii (Sailor Moon Crystal); English: Christine Marie Cabanos (Viz dub); Jen Gould (CWi dub)

In-universe information
- Aliases: Hotaru Tomoe (as one with lookalike reincarnation); Princess Saturn; Sailor Guardian of Ruin and Rebirth; Sailor Scout of Silence (Cloverway English dub); Guardian of Destruction; Mysterious Girl (musicals only); Kon (musicals only)
- Weapon: Silence Glaive (renamed Silent Scythe in Cloverway English version)
- Relatives: Souichi Tomoe (late father; deceased in manga and Sailor Moon Crystal); Keiko Tomoe (late mother; deceased in all versions)
- Nationality: Japanese
- Affiliations: Sailor Guardians; Death Busters (as Mistress 9's host); Dead Moon Circus (musicals); Shadow Galactica (manga and Sailor Moon Crystal)
- Powers and abilities: Immense destructive/deathly powers Erection of force fields Minor healing abilities Reincarnation (within Hotaru); Seeing visions of the near future

Sailor Saturn (Japanese: セーラーサターン, Hepburn: Sērā Satān) is a fictional supporting character in the Sailor Moon franchise. Her spirit resides deep within twelve-year-old Hotaru Tomoe (土萠 ほたる, Tomoe Hotaru), a frail middle schoolgirl who is her lookalike reincarnation, which makes Sailor Saturn her alter ego; entirely apart from how the other nine Sailor Guardians are reborn and their human identities remain separate.

She is the tenth and last of the Sailor Guardians of the long gone Moon Kingdom to be introduced, possessing dark powers associated with silence and ruin, nothingness and the void, destruction and death, annihilation and rebirth. Her powers made her a potential threat as she can wipe out a planet, an entire solar system, or reset its evolution. Her immense destructive powers complement the restorative powers possessed by Sailor Moon.

== Profile ==
Twelve-year-old Hotaru Tomoe depicted in the original 1990s anime's third season

Prior to the main events of Sailor Moon, when Hotaru was eight years old, she lived with her parents in Tokyo's Sankakusu District when a freak storm occurred causing a fire that killed her mother Keiko and left her on the verge of death herself. Later admitting that she was meant to die at the time, Hotaru's life was unnaturally prolonged by both the actions of her father Souichi Tomoe turning her into a cyborg and being made a host to the Daimon Mistress 9 whose presence caused Hotaru's body to suffer seizures with only the Tairon Crystal appearing to reduce the pain, only seen in Sailor Moon Crystal's thirteen-episode third season. Wearing clothes to conceal her altered body, unaware of Mistress 9's existence prior, Hotaru was friendless before meeting her best friend, Chibiusa.

By the time she realized Mistress 9's existence, she loses her body to the Daimon as she steals Chibiusa's Silver Crystal to fully regain her strength. Hotaru is also revealed to be the reincarnation of Sailor Saturn who was responsible for destroying the last remnants of the fallen Moon Kingdom Silver Millenium so it can begin anew of Earth. This fact and her power made her feared by the Outer Guardians as they initially intended to kill Hotaru and seal her soul before she could awaken and destroy Earth. But Hotaru, seemingly destroyed when Mistress 9 ripped herself out of the human's body, ended up awakening as Sailor Saturn when Pharaoh 90 appeared and Sailor Moon appeared to have died in a gambit. Though Saturn intended to destroy Earth along with Pharaoh 90, she stops the destruction upon seeing Sailor Moon alive and deemed destroying Earth to make way for the new Silver Millenium not necessary. She then drives Pharaoh 90 to his domain while sacrificing herself to ensure he remains trapped, though Sailor Moon's restoration brings Hotaru back to Earth as an infant. With her father dead, Hotaru becomes the adopted daughter of Haruka Tenoh, Michiru Kaioh and Setsuna Meioh as the four of them reside at an Empire Victorian House.

In the original anime, Hotaru's story is mostly the same except that she was not modified into a cyborg and Mistress 9 had a stronger influence that played a role in her being ostracized by her classmates. Her father also survived the Death Busters' defeat and was allowed to raise her until Setsuna asks for her help in the first part of Sailor Moon Sailor Stars.

Hotaru's age fluctuates during the series; she is first introduced as a twelve-year-old, is reborn as an infant due to Sailor Saturn's spirit forever within her, quickly develops into a young four or five-year-old child around then reaches her proper chronological age after a metaphysical epiphany with Sailor Saturn herself appearing before her to "wake up." When not transformed, her body retains the smaller height of a five-year-old; the exact same height she gained since being reborn.

In the musicals, Professor Souichi Tomoe is only present in a few stages, though Sailor Saturn appears in every musical from the third on. In musicals where Tomoe is absent, Hotaru is presented as being in the care of Haruka and Michiru. During Last Dracul Jokyoku, Hotaru is presented in the care of Professor Tomoe, knowing of the existence of the Sailor Soldiers, yet not awakening as Sailor Saturn until halfway through the musical.

Naoko Takeuchi, the series creator, describes her as delicate, quiet, precocious, and expressionless.

== Aspects and forms ==
As a character with special powers, ever evolving transformations and a long lifetime virtually spanning between the Silver Millennium era and the 30th century, Hotaru gains multiple aspects and aliases from both her separate personalities (until Mistress 9 is fully expelled) as the series progresses.

=== Sailor Saturn ===
Sailor Saturn wears a dark blue-violet uniform with a pale maroon bow in the front of her chest with a silver crystalline brooch and in the back of her miniskirt. The initial version of this uniform has petal-shaped sleeves, a windrose brooch and choker with the same kind of windrose, bellflower-shaped white gloves, and knee-high, lace up boots. She is given various specific titles, including Guardian of Silence, Guardian of Destruction, and Guardian of Ruin and Rebirth.

Sailor Saturn carries the Silence Glaive, which she may use to bring about the destruction of a world or worlds with a single swing. She also has the ability to heal minor wounds in both her civilian and Guardian forms, having healed Chibiusa when she was attacked by a Daimon, though the process weakens her which was more detrimental while she had Mistress 9 in her body.

In her past life, Sailor Saturn lived far from Silver Millennium and only appears during a crisis with the Three Talismans of her fellow Outer Guardians serving as keys to summon her once the items were brought together. Because of their distance from Silver Millennium and each other, Saturn and the Outer Guardians were not intended to be reborn. But as Hotaru theorized, the events caused by the Death Busters played a key role in her awakening when she was originally meant to die and the Outer Guardians allowed to live normal lives.

Sailor Saturn gains additional powers as the series progresses, and at key points her uniform changes to reflect this. The first change takes place in Act 44 of the manga, when she obtains the Saturn Crystal and her outfit becomes similar to that of Super Sailor Moon. She is not given a new title. A similar event takes place in Episode 168 of the anime, and she is given the name Super Sailor Saturn. A third form appears in Act 49 of the manga, unnamed but similar to Eternal Sailor Moon (without wings). In the official visual book for Sailor Moon Eternal, this form was named "Eternal Sailor Saturn".

In the original anime's fifth and final season, her Eternal form is never seen neither is her transformation sequence into her Super Sailor form.

=== Princess Saturn ===
According to the manga, on Silver Millennium, Sailor Saturn was also the princess of her home planet. She was among those given the duty of protecting the Solar System from outside invasion. As Princess Saturn, she dwelt in Titan Castle and wore a purple gown—she appears in this form in the original manga and in supplementary art. Unlike the other Sailor Guardians, it is stated that Saturn did not awaken on Silver Millennium until after it was destroyed so Princess Saturn's exact status during that time is unclear.

=== Mistress 9 ===
During the third story arc of the manga and the anime adaptations, Hotaru's body was possessed by a parasitic Daimon known as Mistress 9 since she was four years old, whereas the Sailor Guardian of Death and Rebirth had inhabited Hotaru since birth. Mistress 9 eventually took over Hotaru's body and distorted it into an adult-like form, eventually destroying it when Mistress 9 is ripped out of her host's body. In the original anime, retaining her sense and defying the extraterrestrial parasite, like in the manga and its 2014–2023 reboot, Hotaru fully awakened, as one with Sailor Saturn herself, and ultimately destroyed Mistress 9's persona at the cost of her physical self.

A vision of the solitary Sailor Guardian of Space-Time of the Outer Solar System had told Chibiusa of how Mistress 9 was expelled with the help of Sailor Moon, thus enabling Hotaru to live her life anew with Sailor Saturn's vital essence still within her until the renowned Sailor Guardian of Ruin and Rebirth's full powers of death and destruction, annihilation and silence, would be needed once again for an additional crisis.

=== Mysterious Girl ===
In the musical Yume Senshi - Ai - Eien ni... and its revision, Yume Senshi - Ai - Eien ni... Saturn Fukkatsu Hen!, Hotaru takes the alias of a nameless girl while under the control of the Dead Moon Circus, who beat and ridicule her. Her memories are seemingly erased and she is given the powers to enter and alter people's dreams. Only Sailors Uranus, Neptune and Pluto realize who she really is. In the original musical, it is only implied that she is Hotaru, and it is stated but not shown that she is Sailor Saturn. Her actual awakening as Saturn is also ambiguous, while implied, it's not shown and she is simply shown as a normal girl at the end of the musical. In the revision, her identity as Hotaru is stated plainly, and she awakens on-stage as Saturn, after being saved by the other Sailor Guardians and appears transformed moments later.

=== Kon ===
In all four of the Kaguya Island musicals, Hotaru is possessed by a spirit named Kon, who speaks through Hotaru to the other Sailor Guardians. When Hotaru awakens she has no memory of what happened while Kon possessed her body. Kon is the remnant of stars destroyed by Dark Plasman and the comet Coatl. In the first two of these musicals, she gives her power to Sailor Moon in the final battle to allow her to transform into Eternal Sailor Moon. Kon was given the song "Hitosuji no Hikari no Kokoro" in her appearances.

== Special powers and items ==
Sailor Saturn using her Silence Glaive to perform Death Reborn Revolution in Sailor Moon Crystal

While several Sailor Guardians have unusual powers as civilians, Hotaru's are numerous and varied in both her civilian and ever evolving Sailor forms. Some of these are portrayed only in the third story arc, such as her past life existing as a secondary personality that unconsciously transmits visions to the other Sailor Guardians of incoming disasters that would lead to her eventual awakening. Prior to her awakening, Hotaru displayed the ability to involuntarily create force-fields and energy beams whenever in danger and heal minor flesh wounds, as shown when she heals Chibiusa's knee after Chibiusa evades a Daimon attack from Hotaru. Her possession by Mistress 9 also revealed her ability to exist as a disembodied spirit as long as her physical self is intact. Hotaru is shown to be insecure of her destructive powers, and being seen as "weird" by kids at school because of them.

Due to the destructive nature of her powers, Hotaru would be reborn as an infant immediately upon fulfilling her task as Sailor Saturn in an event that ends with her demise. The infant Hotaru would later grow to her former within a matter of days should she need to reawaken, with a visitation by the soul of her past life completing the process.

Sailor Uranus, Sailor Neptune, and Sailor Pluto gained their second transformation when Hotaru gives them their Sailor Crystals while she regained her original twelve-year-old body upon reconnecting with her memories and bonding with Sailor Saturn herself. In the anime, Hotaru is still an infant when Sailor Saturn's mighty power floods Sailors' Uranus, Neptune, and Pluto, upgrading them and herself to their evolved Super forms. In both versions, Hotaru has visions of coming events, especially of danger, and can project these visions to other people. When she is a young girl, she creates a small projection of the galaxy which hovers in the air in her room, simulating astronomical history at high speed. However, it is only in the manga that Haruka stays with her while she reproduces these events to help keep her increasingly powerful abilities in check.

Hotaru's transformation into her standard Sailor form is never shown in the main series, although one of the video games included a shortened transformation sequence, which she initiated by raising her hand in the air (like the other Sailor Soldiers) and shouting "Saturn Planet Power, Make up!". In the manga she eventually gains her Saturn Crystal and does transform in front of the other Soldiers, evoking Saturn Crystal Power, Make Up!. In the anime, although she does upgrade to Super Sailor Saturn, the command Saturn Crystal Power is never mentioned and her transformation is again not shown on-screen.

Sailor Saturn's powers are mostly based on Roman mythology, in which Saturn is the god of the harvest. In Western astrology, the planet Saturn is known as "the Greater Malefic", "the Old Taskmaster" and "the Grim Reaper." Calling herself a "harbinger of death", referred by others as the Forbidden Guardian, Saturn's primary role is execute total annihilation and is normally summoned as a final resort when all hope is lost. Such an example is Saturn wiping out what remained of Silver Millennium after Metaria destroyed most of it, which made the Outer Guardians greatly fear her as they did not fully understand her purpose at the time. Saturn's signature weapon is her Silence Glaive, which is referenced by Sailor Neptune as the "scythe of the Goddess of Death,". This is made apparent as a single swing of the Silence Glaive is enough to destroy an entire world. The Roman god Saturn is often depicted carrying a scythe or sickle, which became symbolic of harvesting human souls at the end of their lifespan.

When first awakened during the Mugen Academy incident, a result of Sailor Moon's apparent demise, Saturn's first act was deeming Earth beyond salvation while fatally weakening Master Pharaoh 90 with her "Death Reborn Revolution." The kanji used with this maneuver translate to "Death World Revolution" (死世界変革), with the intended pronunciation given in furigana. (Note: The visual effect of the attack looks like thousands of ribbons, making the name of the attack a pun on "Reborn" and "Ribbon", which sound very similar in Japanese.) But when Sailor Moon remerges alive and unharmed, Saturn renounces her intent of destroying Earth and deliberately allows herself to be sealed away in Master Pharaoh 90's dimension while he is escaping. In the original anime's third season, Saturn will die from using the attack, only to be saved by Super Sailor Moon at the last moment as she obliterated Pharaoh 90 from existence with incredibly powerful bursts of purple destructive energy.

When Sailor Saturn returns near the end of the fourth story arc, a couple more attacks are introduced. She defends herself and her allies with Silence Wall (不動城壁; "Motionless Rampart"), a dome of dark energy that deflects attacks, and attacks with Silence Glaive Surprise (沈黙鎌奇襲; "Silence Sickle Surprise Attack"). (Note: In the manga and Cosmos, this attack is upgraded to Galactica Glaive Surprise when she is controlled by Sailor Galaxia.) In the anime, she attempts to use this attack against Nehelenia; seeing no other way to defeat her, Saturn intends to bring down her Glaive and destroy everything and everyone, but before she manages to strike the ground Sailor Chibi Moon throws herself at Saturn to stop her from completing the action and sacrificing her life, nevertheless, the Glaive releases massively destructive power that destroys most of Queen Nehelenia's palace.

In the manga and Crystal series, the Death Busters use a power source called the Taioron Crystal which is the life source of their home world. One fragment somehow ended up in the possession of Hotaru's late mother, Keiko Tomoe, with Professor Tomoe giving the item to Hotaru in order to ease her seizures while nourishing Mistress 9 until the Daimon stole Chibiusa's Legendary Silver Crystal of the thirtieth century. The Saturn Crystal is her Sailor Crystal and the source of all her power, which becomes especially important in the fourth and fifth sagas.

By holding hands with the other Sailor Guardians in a circle, she can use Sailor Teleport. When she is controlled by Galaxia in the manga and Crystal, she teams up with Sailor Pluto to perform Galactica Cannon, before teaming up with the other corrupted Guardians to perform Galactica Planet Attack.

== Development ==
In the original character sketches, Takeuchi drew Sailor Saturn with a brown staff rather than her Silence Glaive. Her Sailor Uniform was also different with purple sleeves rather than white, there was no windrose on her chest, and the third band on her gloves was sheer with a point. Her choker also differed from the final version having a gold 6-pointed star rather than the present choker.

The kanji of Hotaru's surname translate as "earth" (土, to) and "sprouting" (萠, moe). The former comes from the name of her planet in Japanese, Dosei (土星, Earth Star). Her given name is in hiragana hotaru (ほたる) and so its meaning is not inherent, but the word itself means "firefly" (蛍), and this meaning is used at least once as a pun. Fireflies are associated with spirits of the dead in Japanese mythology, referring to her status as the Soldier of death and rebirth.

=== Actresses ===
In the Japanese anime series, Hotaru has been voiced by Yūko Minaguchi. In the third season of Sailor Moon Crystal, she is voiced by Yukiyo Fujii. In English, Hotaru is voiced by Jen Gould for the Cloverway Inc. adaptation, and by Christine Marie Cabanos in the Viz Media adaptations.

In the stage musicals, Hotaru has been played by twelve actresses: Keiko Takeda, Chihiro Imai, Asami Sanpei, Mao Mita, Mario Tomioka, Ayami Kakiuchi, Ruria Nakamura, Yui Iizuka, Eriko Funakoshi, Karin Takahashi, Mirai, and Yuuka Ide.

== Reception and influence ==
The official Sailor Moon popularity polls listed Hotaru Tomoe and Sailor Saturn as separate characters. In 1994, with fifty-one choices, Sailor Saturn was the third most popular character and Hotaru was the fourth. In early 1996, with fifty one choices, Saturn was the sixth most popular character, and Hotaru was the seventh.

It has been suggested that moe comes from a contraction of her last name, but this is considered a false etymology.

Tsubame Sanjou of Rurouni Kenshin had her final design based on Hotaru.

== See also ==
- Saturn in fiction
- Saturn (mythology)
- Cronus
- Chronos
- Angel of Death
- Death
- Scythe
- Glaive
