= Jen Gould =

Canadian actress

- Born: Jennifer Gould; March 10, 1971 (age 55); Montreal, Quebec, Canada
- Other name: Jen
- Occupation: Actress
- Years active: 1994–present

Jennifer "Jen" Gould (born March 10, 1971) is a Canadian actress.

She won the 2008 Juno Award for Children's Album of the Year for Music Soup. She is also known for her role as Hotaru Tomoe, and her alter ego Sailor Saturn, in the Cloverway dub of the third season of Sailor Moon as well as PallaPalla in the fourth season of the dub.

== Biography ==
Gould is a native of Montreal, but grew up in Ottawa. She got her start in acting when her father, Robert Gould, took her to an audition for Ottawa's Orpheus Operatic Society, and they were given roles as townsfolk in the play The Music Man. She would go on to attend York University, where she took theatre courses from 1990 to 1994, earning a Bachelor of Fine Arts degree. During five seasons at the Stratford Shakespeare Festival, she took on such roles as Esmeralda in The Hunchback of Notre Dame and the title character in Gigi.

From 2010 to 2013 she attended George Brown College, receiving a diploma for graphic design. She now works as a graphic designer for Rogers Enterprises.

== Personal life ==
Gould is married to Hayes Steinberg; they have two children.

== Filmography ==
=== Film ===
Year	Title	Role	Notes
1993	Anyone for Bridge	Hall Secretary	Short film
1999	The Passion of Ayn Rand	Janet	Television film
1999	Winslow Homer: An American Original	Miss Harper	Television film
2000	Sailor Moon S the Movie: Hearts in Ice	Himeko Nayotake (voice)	Uncredited
2003	Rhinoceros Eyes	Movie Actress / Melissa	

=== Television ===
Year	Title	Role	Notes
1999	Twice in a Lifetime	Lisa Rudinsky	Episode: "Healing Touch"
2000	Rolie Polie Olie	Miss Triangle (voice)	Various Episodes
2000	Sailor Moon	Sailor Saturn, First Church Sister, ParaPara (voices)	32 episodes
2003	Toad Patrol	(voice)	13 episodes
2007	John from Cincinnati	Reporter	2 episodes
2007	Busytown Mysteries	Additional Voices (voice)	7 episodes

=== Video games ===
Year	Title	Role	Notes
2005	Move or Die	Wilma	

Preceded by None	Voice of Sailor Saturn; 2000	Succeeded by Christine Marie Cabanos
