= Barbara Radecki =

Canadian actress

- Born: Canada
- Education: University of Windsor
- Occupations: Actress, voice actress, author, screenwriter, playwright
- Spouse: Philippe Ayoub
- Children: 2
- Website: barbararadecki.com

Barbara Radecki is a Canadian actress and writer who has performed several roles for television shows, movies, and has voiced several animated roles, most notably the voice of Sailor Neptune in the English version of Sailor Moon S produced by Cloverway. She had appeared in several earlier episodes as Ikuko Tsukino and Queen Serenity as well in the DiC produced dubs of the first two seasons of Sailor Moon. She is married to Philippe Ayoub and has two children. She is also a screen play writer and young adult novel writer.

== Filmography ==
=== Film ===
Year	Title	Role	Notes
1989	Murder by Night	Hostess	Television film
1995	Kissinger and Nixon	Muriel	Television film
1996	Gotti	Mary	Television film
1996	Devil's Food		Television film
1998	Escape from Wildcat Canyon	Jaynie Flint	
1998	All I Wanna Do	Mrs. Parker	
1998	54	TV Host	
1998	Dead Husbands	Mrs. Fisher	Television film
1999	Three to Tango	Channel 28 Reporter	
2000	Rats	Girlfriend	
2000	Sailor Moon S the Movie: Hearts in Ice	Sailor Neptune (voice)	
2000	Dirty Pictures	Clarissa Dalrymple	Television film
2000	Sailor Moon SuperS the Movie: Black Dream Hole	Sailor Neptune (voice)	
2002	Expecting	Dani	
2003	Beautiful Girl	Caroline Leslie	Television film
2005	Getting Along Famously	Bonnie Bronte	Television film
2005	The Life and Hard Times of Guy Terrifico	Mother Horton	
2006	Man of the Year	Reporter #2	
2009	The Death of Alice Blue	Sherry	
2009	Throwing Stones	Shirley Campbell	Television film
2012	Baby Half Lie	Dr. Scavani	Short film
2020	Modern Persuasion	N/A	Screenwriter

=== Television ===
Year	Title	Role	Notes
1987	Check It Out!	Gilda	Episode: "Here Comes the Bride"
1989	The Twilight Zone	Fan	Episode: "Special Service"
1990	Friday the 13th: The Series	Carol	Episode: "The Long Road Home"
1995–2000	Sailor Moon	Ikuko Tsukino / Queen Serenity / Michelle Kaioh/Sailor Neptune	60 episodes
1996	Forever Knight	Andrea King	Episode: "Dead of Night"
1997	La Femme Nikita	Suzanne Perez	Episode: "Escape"
1998	Eerie, Indiana: The Other Dimension	Mrs. Covington	Episode: "The Goody Two-Shoes People"
1998	Goosebumps	Alice Rowe	2 episodes
2001	Twice in a Lifetime	Young Camilla Bianco	Episode: "Mama Mia"
2003	The Eleventh Hour	Shannon Marsh	Episode: "Don't Have a Cow"
2003	Wild Card	Mrs. Bridges	Episode: "Sand Trap"
2003–2004	Queer as Folk	Kellie McQuaid	2 episodes
2004	Zixx	Mrs. Millis	Episode: "Four's a Crowd"
2004	Doc	Paula Clayton	Episode: "Wedding Bell Blues"
2005	Kojak	Jill Foster	Episode: "East Sixties"
2006	11 Cameras	Paula	20 episodes
2006	Getting Along Famously	Debbie Bronte	6 episodes
2006	Angela's Eyes	Laura Keene	Episode: "Political Eyes"
2009	The Listener	Julia Higgins	Episode: "A Voice in the Dark"
2010	Warehouse 13	Evelyn	Episode: "Buried"
2011	Good Dog	Julia	2 episodes
2012	Degrassi: The Next Generation	Mrs. Saunders	Episode: "Rusty Cage: Part 2"

Preceded by None	Voice of Sailor Neptune; 2000	Succeeded by Lauren Landa
