= Sailor Moon Crystal =

Japanese anime series

- Japanese: 美少女戦士セーラームーンCrystal(クリスタル)
- Literal meaning: Pretty Guardian Sailor Moon Crystal
- Revised Hepburn: Bishōjo Senshi Sērā Mūn Kurisutaru
- Also known as: Sailor Moon Crystal Season I & II (Note: Full title: Pretty Guardian Sailor Moon Crystal Season I & II (美少女戦士セーラームーンCrystal(クリスタル) Season I & II, Bishōjo Senshi Sērā Mūn Kurisutaru Shizun Wan and Tsū))
- Type: Original net animation
- Genre: Magical girl
- Based on: Sailor Moon by Naoko Takeuchi
- Directed by: Munehisa Sakai
- Series composition: Yūji Kobayashi
- Character designer: Yukie Sakō
- Music by: Yasuharu Takanashi
- Country of origin: Japan
- Original language: Japanese
- No. of seasons: 2
- No. of episodes: 26 (list of episodes)

Production
- Art directors: Takashi Kurahashi; Yumi Hosaka
- Cinematographer: Takeo Ogiwara
- Color designers: Kunio Tsujita; Tomoko Kobiki
- Editors: Nobutaka Maki
- Executive producers: Takuya Matsushita (Kodansha); Atsutoshi Umezawa (Toei Animation)
- Producers: Junichirō Tsuchiya (Kodansha); Yū Kaminoki (Toei Animation); Ruka Tanaka (Toei Animation, S2)
- Production companies: Kodansha; Toei Animation

Original release
- Network: Niconico
- Release: July 5, 2014 – July 18, 2015

Related
- Anime television series
- Original network: Tokyo MX
- Original run: April 6 – September 28, 2015
- Anime television series

Sailor Moon Crystal Season III (Note: Full title: Pretty Guardian Sailor Moon Crystal Season III (美少女戦士セーラームーンCrystal(クリスタル) Season III, Bishōjo Senshi Sērā Mūn Kurisutaru Shizun Surī))
- Directed by: Chiaki Kon
- Produced by: Junichirō Tsuchiya; Ruka Tanaka
- Series composition by: Yūji Kobayashi
- Character design by: Akira Takahashi
- Art directed by: Takashi Kurahashi
- Color design by: Tomoko Kobiki
- Cinematography: Noriyuki Murakami
- Edited by: Nobutaka Maki
- Music by: Yasuharu Takanashi
- Production companies: Kodansha; Toei Animation
- Licensed by: Crunchyroll (Note: In Australia through Madman Anime.); NA: Viz Media
- Original network: Tokyo MX, SUN, TVQ, TVh, TVA, BS11
- English network: AU: ABC Me; CA: Family Channel
- Original run: April 4 – June 27, 2016
- Episodes: 13
- Sequels
- Sailor Moon Eternal (Note: Full title: Pretty Guardian Sailor Moon Eternal The Movie (劇場版「美少女戦士セーラームーンEternal(エターナル)」, Gekijōban Bishōjo Senshi Sērā Mūn Etānaru)) (2021, 2-part film); Sailor Moon Cosmos (Note: Full title: Pretty Guardian Sailor Moon Cosmos The Movie (劇場版「美少女戦士セーラームーンCosmos(コスモス)」, Gekijōban Bishōjo Senshi Sērā Mūn Kosumosu)) (2023, 2-part film)

Sailor Moon Crystal (Note: Also known as Pretty Guardian Sailor Moon Crystal (Japanese: 美少女戦士セーラームーンCrystal(クリスタル), Hepburn: Bishōjo Senshi Sērā Mūn Kurisutaru)) is a Japanese anime series based on the Sailor Moon manga series written and illustrated by Naoko Takeuchi. Co-produced by Kodansha and Toei Animation with animation by latter, Crystal commemorates the 20th anniversary of the manga, and a second anime adaptation of the manga following the first anime series; It serves as a reboot by closely following the original source material. Set in Tokyo in the 2010s, the story focuses on Usagi Tsukino, a middle school student who transforms and fight as the titular character, and searches for Princess Serenity and the Silver Crystal with her fellow Sailor Guardians. The first two seasons, directed by Munehisa Sakai, streamed worldwide on Niconico from July 5, 2014, to July 18, 2015, with each episodes released twice a month, and the Blu-ray updated version aired on Tokyo MX between April 6 and September 28, 2015. The third season, directed by Chiaki Kon and based on the Infinity arc of the manga, aired on Tokyo MX between April 4 and June 27, 2016.

Viz Media licensed Crystal for an English-language release in North America, simulcasting the series on Neon Alley and Hulu to coincide with the worldwide streaming. Crunchyroll also simulcast the series in a separate contract with Toei Animation.

A sequel two-part film, Sailor Moon Eternal, based on the Dream arc of the manga, was released in 2021, with the first film released on January 8 and the second on February 11, followed by another sequel two-part film, Sailor Moon Cosmos, based on the Stars arc of the manga, which was released on June 9 and 30, 2023.

== Plot ==
=== Dark Kingdom ===
Set in Tokyo in the 2010s, Usagi Tsukino, a fourteen-year-old middle school student, meets Luna, a talking black cat that tells her that she is Sailor Moon, a Sailor Guardian destined to fight a group of villains called the Dark Kingdom. Luna also instructs Sailor Moon to find her four fellow Sailor Guardians, the long-lost Princess of an ancestral kingdom on the Moon, and a legendary artifact of supreme power known as the Silver Crystal. On her journey, Sailor Moon meets her fellow Guardians Sailor Mercury (Ami Mizuno), Sailor Mars (Rei Hino), Sailor Jupiter (Makoto Kino), Sailor Venus (Minako Aino), and a mysterious masked man called Tuxedo Mask (Mamoru Chiba), to whom Usagi is attracted. Later, Usagi and the Sailor Guardians discover that in their previous lives they were members of an ancient Moon Kingdom in a period of time called the Silver Millennium. The Dark Kingdom waged war against them, resulting in the destruction of the Moon Kingdom. It turns out that Sailor Moon herself is Serenity, the Princess of the Moon Kingdom, and that she alone has the power to make the Silver Crystal appear and to use its incredible mystical powers to overcome the forces of evil.

Meanwhile, Tuxedo Mask is revealed to be Endymion, the first crown prince of the Earth and Serenity's lover in his previous life. After defeating the Four Kings of Heaven (who turn out to have been Prince Endymion's loyal knights in the past) and killing their leader Queen Beryl, the Sailor Guardians confront a brainwashed Endymion and the ruler of the Dark Kingdom — Queen Metaria. To prevent Queen Metaria from spreading darkness all over the Earth, the Guardians sacrifice their lives. Using the power of the Silver Crystal, Sailor Moon destroys Queen Metaria and reunites with Mamoru and her four friends upon returning them to life.

=== Black Moon ===
After Sailor Moon restores the Earth to normal and prepares to live a normal life again with Mamoru and her friends, a little girl falls from the sky, claiming to have the same name as Usagi, but nicknamed as "Chibiusa" by Usagi and the others. A group of villains called the Black Moon Clan, led by Prince Demande, initiate a series of operations which lead to the abductions of Sailors Mars, Mercury, and Jupiter while looking for Chibiusa and the Silver Crystal. Chibiusa is revealed to be Sailor Moon's and Tuxedo Mask's daughter from a distant future that has been decimated by the Clan, and is searching for Sailor Moon and the Silver Crystal in order to save her mother. Sailor Moon and her friends accompany Chibiusa to the future, and they meet the Guardian of Spacetime and Chibiusa's friend, Sailor Pluto.

After being captured herself, Sailor Moon then rescues Mars, Mercury, and Jupiter, and they escape from the planet Nemesis, the Black Moon Clan's headquarters. Chibiusa is manipulated by Prince Demande's advisor and true mastermind of the Black Moon Clan, Death Phantom, and transforms into Black Lady, who brainwashes Tuxedo Mask as well. During an intense battle, Demande manages to obtain the Silver Crystals of the past and the future and tries to bring them together to destroy the universe in a time paradox. Sailor Pluto stops time to prevent this from happening, leading to her own death. Black Lady is shocked to see her friend die and reverts to her true self, transforming into Sailor Chibi Moon. Demande dies protecting Sailor Moon from Death Phantom, but the latter is destroyed by the combined powers of Sailor Moon and Sailor Chibi Moon. Neo-Queen Serenity, the future self of Sailor Moon who had also awakened, gives the four Sailor Guardians new Planet Powers and gives Sailor Moon a new brooch, as her old one was destroyed defeating Death Phantom. Sailor Moon and her friends say goodbye to their future selves and return to the past. Chibiusa stays in the future, but returns to the past shortly afterwards to train as a Sailor Guardian.

=== Death Busters ===
After students from the prestigious Mugen Academy become victims of a group of villains called the Death Busters, who transform them into Daimons, Usagi and their friends meet two Mugen Academy students: tomboyish car racer Haruka Tenoh and violinist prodigy Michiru Kaioh. Haruka and Michiru are the civilian identities of two new Sailor Guardians: Sailor Uranus and Sailor Neptune, who are initially reluctant to work with Sailor Moon and the others. Chibiusa befriends a mysterious girl named Hotaru Tomoe, daughter of Mugen Academy founder Professor Tomoe, who is later revealed to be a key figure of the Death Busters.

Sailor Pluto is revived and reborn as university student Setsuna Meioh, and she joins Sailors Uranus and Sailor Neptune. Using the power of all nine Sailor Guardians, Usagi evolves into Super Sailor Moon. The Sailor Guardians learn that Hotaru's body is host to Mistress 9, partner of the leader of the Death Busters, Master Pharaoh 90. At the same time, Hotaru is also the lookalike reincarnation of the Sailor Guardian of Silence and Destruction, Sailor Saturn, who has the power to destroy the whole world. For this reason, Sailors Uranus, Neptune, and Pluto fear her. In the climactic battle, Pharaoh 90 begins to merge himself with the planet, but the newly awakened Sailor Saturn uses her full power to send him back to his dimension, the Tau Star System, sacrificing herself in the process. As Neo-Queen Serenity, Usagi restores the city and resurrects everyone that was killed in the final battle, including Hotaru, who is immediately reborn as an infant alongside Saturn's spirit within her once again. Haruka, Michiru, and Setsuna vow to be Hotaru's family (as Professor Tomoe was killed by Sailor Moon) and leave the city, with the promise to rejoin Usagi and her friends someday.

== Production and broadcasting ==
=== Seasons 1 and 2 ===
On July 6, 2012, Kodansha and Toei Animation announced that it would commence production of a new anime adaptation for a simultaneous worldwide release in 2013 as part of the series' 20th anniversary celebrations. The idol group Momoiro Clover Z would perform the opening and ending theme songs. In April 2013, it was announced the new anime had been delayed. On August 4, 2013, it was confirmed the new anime will be streamed late in the year.

On January 9, 2014, it was announced the anime would premiere in July, and on the same day, executive producer, Atsutoshi Umezawa announced that the new anime is not a remake of the previous anime, but a reboot by adapting Naoko Takeuchi's original manga from scratch. On March 13, 2014, the new anime's official website was updated to show a countdown beginning on March 14 for an announcement due to occur on March 21. That day, its official website showed an image displaying the key visual art, synopsis, and staff for the new anime. It also revealed the anime would be called Sailor Moon Crystal. The series was directed by Munehisa Sakai at Toei Animation, Yūji Kobayashi handled the series' scripts, Yukie Sakō handled the character designs, Takashi Kurahashi and Yumi Hosaka oversaw the background art and Yasuharu Takanashi composed the music.

In an interview with director Munehisa Sakai and character designer Yukie Sakō, Sakai also revealed that the series this time around was aimed at grown-ups who've either read the manga or watched the previous anime series, and wanted to portray the realistic girls' drama. Therefore, when Sakō was chosen, her approach for the art style for the series was a balance between creator Naoko Takeuchi's recent illustration style and modern anime style, with approval from Takeuchi herself. Sakai added that the transformation sequences will be shown in 3DCG to broaden the range of expression and camera angles. For the title of the reboot series, the name Crystal was chosen by creator Naoko Takeuchi out of many titles the staff had created.

In April 2014, new cast members were announced: Hisako Kanemoto was cast as Ami Mizuno / Sailor Mercury, Rina Satō as Rei Hino / Sailor Mars, Ami Koshimizu as Makoto Kino / Sailor Jupiter and Shizuka Itō as Minako Aino / Sailor Venus, with Kotono Mitsuishi reprising her role as the titular character. The same month, Kodansha and Toei Animation confirmed the series would run for 26 episodes and streamed worldwide on the video sharing Niconico website with subtitles in 12 languages on the first and third Saturdays of each month. In June 2014, the cast members for the Dark Kingdom were announced; Misa Watanabe was cast as Queen Beryl, and Daisuke Kishio, Kōsuke Toriumi, Masaya Matsukaze and Eiji Takemoto as Four Kings of Heaven: Jadeite, Nephrite, Zoisite, and Kunzite respectively, and Ryō Hirohashi and Kenji Nojima was cast as Luna and Mamoru Chiba / Tuxedo Mask respectively the same month. The first episode of the series had an advanced screening on June 30, 2014. It premiered on July 5, 2014, and ended on January 17, 2015.

On November 8, 2014, it was announced that the latter half of the 26 episode-run will be the second season, covering the Black Moon arc of the manga. During a special screening of the Dark Kingdom finale on December 27, 2014, the new cast for the second season were announced: Misato Fukuen was cast as Chibiusa, while Ai Maeda as Sailor Pluto. In January 2015, the cast for the Black Moon Clan was unveiled: Mamoru Miyano was cast as Prince Demand, Tsubasa Yonaga as Blue Saphir, Houko Kuwashima as Green Esmeraude and Hiroki Takahashi as Crimson Rubeus. In March 2015, Japanese talent Shoko Nakagawa was cast as Diana.

The second season debuted on February 7, 2015, and ended on July 18, 2015. The final episode ended with "À bientôt" message, with the official Sailor Moon website and twitter account thanking the fans for watching the online stream of the series, along with director Sakai and character designer Sakō announcing their departure. The Blu-ray updated version of the first and second season aired on Tokyo MX between April 6 and September 28, 2015. It later re-aired on the same network from October 5, 2015 to March 28, 2016 after the third season's announcement.

=== Season 3 ===
In September 2015, the third season of Sailor Moon Crystal was in production, covering the Infinity arc of the manga (known as Death Busters arc in Japan). In January 2016, it was announced that the third season will premiere in spring, along with new and returning key staff members: Chiaki Kon and Akira Takahashi are taking over Sakai and Sakō's position as series director and character designer respectively, while Yūji Kobayashi, Takashi Kurahashi and Yasuharu Takanashi will return to oversee the series' scripts, provide background art and compose the music respectively. The name for the season was announced as Sailor Moon Crystal Season III.

In an interview with director Chiaki Kon, series supervisor Fumio Osano and character designer Akira Takahashi, Kon had no prior knowledge of the manga's existence, as she had only watched the 1990s anime series when she was younger, therefore reading it as she was directing the series. Osano complemented that Kon was good at filling in gaps that happened between the panels of the manga to the animation. Kon also revealed she accepted the directorial position in condition of changing the transformation sequences from 3DCG to hand-drawn animation. Takahashi was instructed by Kon to change the art style for the season to look more cuter and have more anime-like balance.

The new cast for the third season were announced in a live webcast the same month: Junko Minagawa was cast as Haruka Tenoh / Sailor Uranus, Sayaka Ohara as Michiru Kaioh / Sailor Neptune and Yukiyo Fujii as Hotaru Tomoe / Sailor Saturn. The Death Busters cast was also revealed on the same day: Hikari Yono as Kaolinite, Takuya Kirimoto as Professor Souichi Tomoe, Takaya Hashi as Master Pharaoh 90 and Chiaki Takahashi, Yuki Nagaku, Rina Honnizumi, Naomi Ōzora and Umeka Shoji as the Witches 5: Eudial, Mimete, Viluy, Tellu and Cyprine respectively.

The first episode of the third season was previewed at a special event held at Animate Ikebukuro store in Tokyo on March 6, 2016. The third season began its regular airing on Tokyo MX between April 4, and June 27, 2016, with a total of 13 episodes.

=== Sequels ===
In January 2017, it was announced on the Sailor Moon 25th anniversary website that Sailor Moon Crystal would receive a sequel, and in June of the same month, it was revealed that the fourth season covering the Dream arc of the manga was being produced as a two-part theatrical anime film project opposed to a television series. Chiaki Kon returned direct the film, and Kazuko Tadano was announced as a new character designer. Kazuyuki Fudeyasu provided the screenplay, Yoko Saitō handled the background art, Yasuharu Takanashi returned to compose the music, and original creator Naoko Takeuchi chief supervised the film's production, with Studio Deen co-producing the film with Toei Animation. The name for the two-part film was announced as Sailor Moon Eternal. The first film was slated to be released on September 11, 2020, but was postponed and released on January 8, 2021, due to COVID-19 pandemic. The second film was released on February 11, 2021.

The fifth and final season, based on the Stars arc of the manga, was also produced as a two-part theatrical anime film project. The majority of key staff members returned from the Eternal two-part film, while Tomoya Takahashi served as a director and Yumiko Kuga of Studio Jack handling the background art. The title of the two-part film was announced as Sailor Moon Cosmos. The two-part film was released in 2023, with the first film on June 9, and the second film on June 30.

=== International production and broadcast ===
In May 2014, Viz Media licensed the anime for an English-language release in North America as Sailor Moon Crystal. The series began streaming on Hulu and Neon Alley simultaneously on July 5, 2014. Crunchyroll also began streaming the series on its website during the simulcast. At the 2014 Anime Expo convention in Los Angeles, Viz Media announced that the cast used for the Sailor Moon re-dub would also reprise their roles in Crystal. Viz premiered the first episode as part of their "Sailor Moon Day" celebration at the Anime Expo Convention in Los Angeles. On November 28, 2014, Madman Entertainment announced that they have the rights for Sailor Moon Crystal for Australia and New Zealand, who later broadcast the series on ABC Me, and made the series available for streaming on AnimeLab. On November 20, 2015, Viz Media started streaming the Sailor Moon Crystal English dub on Neon Alley and Hulu. In Italy, the series was broadcast on Rai Gulp, making Crystal the first series in the franchise that was broadcasting on a Rai or other TV channels in Italy other than the Mediaset channels, which broadcast the original series. In Canada, the series was broadcast on WildBrain's now-defunct Family Channel.

In June 2021, Netflix announced that Sailor Moon Crystal will be streamed on its platform on July 1, 2021.

== Related media ==
=== Home release ===
The first two seasons of Sailor Moon Crystal were released in Japan in thirteen Blu-ray box sets. Each volume contained two episodes. A limited edition Blu-ray was released first. A regular DVD and Blu-ray were released a month later on the exact date of the next limited-edition Blu-ray. The first limited-edition Blu-ray was released on October 15, 2014.

The third season of Sailor Moon Crystal was released in Japan in three Blu-ray box sets, with each volume containing four episodes each (five episodes on the last volume). The first limited-edition Blu-ray was released on June 29, 2016.

=== Soundtrack ===
Yasuharu Takanashi composed the score for Sailor Moon Crystal. The series uses two pieces of theme music for the first two seasons. The opening theme song is "Moon Pride" and the ending theme song is "Gekkō" (月虹; lit. 'Moonbow'); both themes were performed by Momoiro Clover Z. The ending theme's music was written by Naoko Takeuchi (under the name of "Sumire Shirobara"), and composed by Akiko Kosaka, who has written several songs for the Sailor Moon series. The character song album, titled Pretty Guardian Sailor Moon Crystal Character Song Collection: Crystal Collection, was released on April 29, 2015. For the third season, four pieces of theme music are used: one opening theme and three ending themes. The opening theme song, "New Moon ni Koishite" (ニュームーンに恋して, Nyū Mūn ni Koishite; lit. 'Fall in Love with a New Moon') has three different versions. The first version is performed by Etsuko Yakushimaru for the first four episodes and reprised for the final episode, the second version performed by Mitsuko Horie for acts 31 to 34, and the third performed by Momoiro Clover Z for acts 35 to 38. The first ending theme song is "Eternal Eternity" performed by Junko Minagawa and Sayaka Ohara, who voice Sailors Uranus and Neptune, respectively, used for acts 27 to 30 and reprised for act 39, mirroring the first version of the opening theme. The second ending theme song is "Otome no Susume" (乙女のススメ; lit. 'Maiden's Advice') performed by Misato Fukuen, who is Chibiusa's voice actress, used for acts 31 to 34, mirroring the second version of the opening theme. The third and final ending theme song is "Eien Dake ga Futari wo Kakeru" (永遠だけが二人をかける; lit. 'Eternity Brings Two Together') performed by Kenji Nojima, who is Mamoru Chiba's voice actor, used for acts 35 to 38, mirroring the third version of the opening theme.

== Reception ==
The first episode of Sailor Moon Crystal earned a viewership of over one million on Niconico during the first two days of streaming it.

=== Critical response ===
The first two seasons of Sailor Moon Crystal were criticized for its overly fast pacing and its animation, which had noticeable errors. Victoria McNally of The Mary Sue wrote: "I can overlook poor quality animation when it's not too distracting. The problem with Sailor Moon Crystal is that it is getting distracting, because the series also has issues with the pacing and quality of its storytelling—which gives you a lot of downtime to criticize all of its visual flaws."

The third season however, was praised for its improved animation and better characterization. Michael S. Mammano of Den of Geek, who reviewed the first episode of the third season, wrote "This feels like a whole new show, and I mean that in the best way", and rated the episode 4 out of 5 stars.

Rebecca Silverman of Anime News Network gave the first two seasons B− ratings, while solid B rating for the third season, as she felt that while the first two seasons are good on their own, the third season was an improvement out of all three seasons.
