= Yukiyo Fujii =

Japanese voice actress

- 藤井 ゆきよ
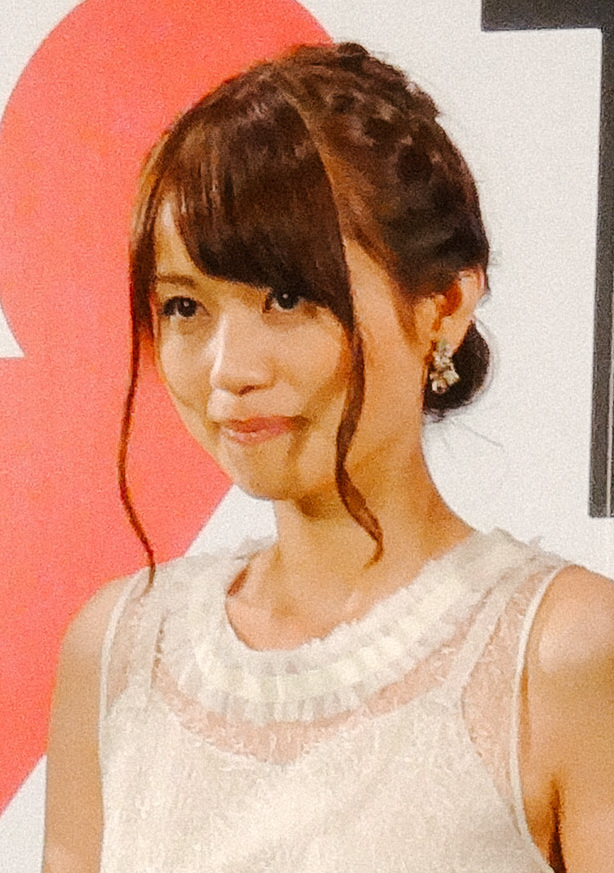
- Born: May 8, 1985 (age 41); Kanagawa Prefecture, Japan
- Occupations: Actress; voice actress
- Years active: 2009–present
- Agent: Aoni Production
- Notable work: Sailor Moon Crystal as Hotaru Tomoe/Sailor Saturn; The Idolmaster Million Live! as Megumi Tokoro; Amagi Brilliant Park as Latifah Fleuranza; GeGeGe no Kitarō as Mana Inuyama; Citrus as Harumi Taniguchi; Umamusume: Pretty Derby as Tazuna Hayakawa
- Height: 169 cm (5 ft 7 in)

Yukiyo Fujii (藤井 ゆきよ, Fujii Yukiyo; born May 8, 1985) is a Japanese actress and singer who specializes in voice acting. She is affiliated with Aoni Production.

== Biography ==
Before becoming a voice actor, Fujii worked as a stage lighting technician.

She has participation experience in the Miss International Japan beauty pageant.

She was originally affiliated with Aoi Corporation, where she also appeared in Television Dramas, amongst others. In April 2011, she moved to Aoni Production.

Her first voice role was in the anime film Patema Inverted. Other notable roles include Tetra in Log Horizon, Latifah Fleuranza in Amagi Brilliant Park, and Hotaru Tomoe in Sailor Moon Crystal. In 2024, she voiced Maria Mikhailovna Kujou, also known as Masha, in Alya Sometimes Hides Her Feelings in Russian.

== Filmography ==
=== Television animation ===
List of voice performances in anime
Year	Series	Role	Notes	Source
2010	Fairy Tail	Millianna, Gemi		
2010	HeartCatch PreCure!	Nanami Shiku		
2011	Battle Spirits: Heroes	Eiko		
2011	Sket Dance	Yukie Izumisawa		
2011	Digimon Xros Wars: The Young Hunters Who Leapt Through Time	Various classmates		
2012	Btooom!	Yuki		
2012	Fairy Tail	Katja		
2012	Kokoro Connect	Mihara		
2012	Saint Seiya Omega	Emma		
2012	Smile PreCure!	Hina Midorikawa, Mayuka Kashiwamoto		
2012	Tanken Driland	Ellen		
2013	Jewelpet Happiness	Sachi Hakamada		
2013	Little Busters!	Jirō		
2014	Amagi Brilliant Park	Latifah Fleuranza		
2014	Cross Ange	Maki		
2014	Fairy Tail Series 2	Millianna, Gemi		
2014	Golden Time	Abu		
2014	Log Horizon 2	Tetra		
2014	Lord Marksman and Vanadis	Regnas		
2014	Nano Invaders	Mimi		
2015	Fairy Tail Series 2	Michelia		
2015	Food Wars: Shokugeki no Soma	Aki Koganei		
2015	Lupin the 3rd: Part IV	Rebecca Rossellini		
2015	Maria the Virgin Witch	Valkyrie		
2015	Ultimate Otaku Teacher	Keiko		
2016	Dimension W	Cassidy		
2016	Lupin III: Italian Game	Rebecca Rossellini		
2016	Pretty Guardian Sailor Moon Crystal Season III	Hotaru Tomoe/Sailor Saturn, Mistress 9	TV Anime, Season 3	
2016	Please Tell Me! Galko-chan	Kuseta		
2016	Super Lovers	Ayumi Asakura		
2016	Re:Zero − Starting Life in Another World	Mimi Pearlbaton		
2016	Undefeated Bahamut Chronicle	Krulcifer Einfolk		
2017	Kemono Friends	Alpaca Suri		
2017	Twin Angel Break	Nui		
2017	Kirakira PreCure a la Mode	Mariko Himukai		
2017	Magical Circle Guru Guru	Toma		
2017	Seiren	Yoko Kikuchi		
2018	Citrus	Harumi Taniguchi		
2018–20	GeGeGe no Kitarō	Mana Inuyama		
2018	Conception	Yuzuha		
2018	Umamusume: Pretty Derby	Tazuna Hayakawa		
2019	Pastel Memories	Kaoruko Nijouin		
2019	One Piece	Kinderella		
2019	Fruits Basket	Hanajima Megumi		
2019–21	True Cooking Master Boy	Si Lang/Shirou		
2019	Chidori RSC	Yūko Tsurumaki		
2019-2020	Star Twinkle Pretty Cure	Irma		
2020	A Certain Scientific Railgun T	Seria "Bare Navel Headband" Kumokawa		
2020	Gibiate	Kathleen Funada		
2020	Monster Girl Doctor	Lulala Haine		
2020	Magatsu Wahrheit -Zuerst-	Erufuriide		
2021	Log Horizon: Destruction of the Round Table	Tetra		
2021	World Trigger	Madoka Ui		
2021	Edens Zero	Sister Ivry		
2021–22	Komi Can't Communicate	Himiko Agari		
2021	Rumble Garanndoll	Musashi Sashigami		
2021	Tawawa on Monday 2	Rikei-chan		
2022	Life with an Ordinary Guy Who Reincarnated into a Total Fantasy Knockout	Telolilo Lilili Lu		
2022	Love Flops	Yoshino Feynman		
2023	Farming Life in Another World	Ann		
2024	Brave Bang Bravern!	Karen Aldrin		
2024	Blue Archive the Animation	Kayoko Onikata		
2024	Alya Sometimes Hides Her Feelings in Russian	Maria Mikhailovna Kujou		
2025	The Mononoke Lecture Logs of Chuzenji-sensei	Hanayo Renjō		
2025	Me and the Alien MuMu	Sonoko Kagetsu		
2025	Dekin no Mogura	Yaeko Kirihara		
2026	Playing Death Games to Put Food on the Table	Yuki's Agent		

=== OVA ===
- Chain Chronicle (2014) as Juliana
- The Kawai Complex Guide to Manors and Hostel Behavior (2015)
- Strike the Blood II OVA as Kiriha Kisaki

=== Anime Film ===
Year	Film	Role	Note
2011	Toriko 3D: Kaimaku! Gourmet Adventure!!	Marilyn	
2012	One Piece Film Z		
2013	Dragon Ball Z: Battle of Gods		
2013	Patema Inverted	Patema	
2018	I Want to Eat Your Pancreas	Kyōko	
2021	Pretty Guardian Sailor Moon Eternal The Movie	Hotaru Tomoe/Super Sailor Saturn	2-Part Film, Season 4 of Sailor Moon Crystal (Dead Moon arc)
2023	Pretty Guardian Sailor Moon Cosmos The Movie	Hotaru Tomoe/Eternal Sailor Saturn	2-Part Film, Season 5 of Sailor Moon Crystal (Shadow Galactica arc)
2023	Maboroshi	Reina Yasumi	

=== ONA ===
- Kyōsōgiga (2012) as male student (ep 1); Miyakoi (ep 2); girl (ep 3)
- Hero Mask (2018–19) as Eve Palmer
- Akuma-kun (2023) as Hina Asanagi

=== Video games ===
- HeartCatch PreCure! Oshare Collection (2010) as Nanami Shiku
- Original story from Fairy Tail: Gekitotsu! Kardia Daiseidō (2011) as Gemi
- 7th Dragon 2020 (2011) as Reimi
- Beast Breakers (2012) as Seria Balaine
- Conception: Ore no Kodomo o Undekure! (2012) as Yuzuha
- Fairy Tail: Portable Guild 2 (2011) as Lily
- Fairy Tail: Zeref Kakusei (2012) as Gemi
- Nendoroid Generation (2012) as Enemy Nendoroid <energy system>; skeleton; wild rabbit; Bisuteri; Kokurei
- STORM LOVER KAI!! (2012)
- Tales of Xillia 2 (2012)
- 7th Dragon 2020-II (2013) as Reimi
- The Idolmaster Million Live! (2013) as Megumi Tokoro
- Muv-Luv Alternative: Total Eclipse (2013) as Tatiana Belskaya; Ensign Rebecca Lint
- Magica Wars Zanbatsu (2014) as Minamo Kōsaka
- Granblue Fantasy (2014) as Haaselia
- Miko no Mori (2014) as Sakurako Nitta
- To Heart: Heartful Party (2014) as Yasuko Tsubaki
- Hortensia Saga -Aoi no Kishi-dan- (2015) as
- Kemono Friends (2015) as Kinshikō (Golden Snub-nosed Monkey)
- Lord of Vermilion Arena (2015) as Annerose
- Monmusu Harem (2015) as Reirinka Shimiya
- Private Model (2015) as Akane Hatsukawa
- Shingeki no Bahamut (2015) as Sui and Pene
- Arena of Valor (2016) as Mina
- Exos Heroes (2019) as Iris
- Girls' Frontline as T-5000 and K2
- Atelier Ryza 2: Lost Legends & the Secret Fairy (2020) as Serri Glaus
- Blue Archive (2021) as Kayoko Onikata
- Samurai Warriors 5 (2021) as Nōhime/Kicho
- Umamusume: Pretty Derby (2021) as Tazuna Hayakawa
- Counter:Side (2021) as Kasukape Yumi (Lee Yumi), Cathy Wade, Yen Xing Lanchester
- Digimon Survive (2022) as Labramon
- Xenoblade Chronicles 3 (2022) as Nimue
- Azur Lane (2022) as Serri Glaus
- Engage Kill (2023) as Aoi Kotobuki
- Zenless Zone Zero (2024) as Soldier 11

=== Drama CD ===
- Place to Place 3: Tenka Musō no Nyan-dere-ra (2011) as Schoolgirl
- Shimekiri-sama ni Oyurushi wo (2011) as Suimin
- Waratte! Sotomura-san (2012) as Yoshinaga-sensei
- √3 = (Hitonami ni Ogore ya Onago) (2013) as Hoyu Kōzenji
- citrus (2015) as Harumi Taniguchi

=== Dubbing ===
==== Live-action ====
- Nathalie Emmanuel
  - Game of Thrones as Missandei
  - The Titan as Tally Rutherford
- The Bling Ring as Sam Moore (Taissa Farmiga)
- Dune: Part Two as Lady Margot Fenring (Léa Seydoux)
- Flatliners as Marlo (Nina Dobrev)
- The Perks of Being a Wallflower as Sam (Emma Watson)

==== Animation ====
- Helluva Boss as Verosika Mayday

=== TV Drama ===
- Kasōken no Onna ninth series Episode 8 (August 27, 2009, TV Asahi) - Satsuki Mizuhara
- Castle of Sand (September 10–11, 2011, TV Asahi) - Ritsuko
- Puropōzu Kyōdai ~Umare-jun Betsu Otoko ga Kekkon suru Hōhō~ first night "Hajime-kko ga Kekkon suru Hōhō" (February 21, 2011, Fuji TV)

=== Movie ===
- Shizumanu Taiyō (October 24, 2009, Toho)

== Discography ==
=== Singles ===
Release date	Title	Artist	Track listing
April 24, 2013	The Idolmaster Live Theater Performance 01: Thank You!	765 MillionStars	"Thank You!"
April 24, 2013	The Idolmaster Live Theater Performance 01: Thank You!	765Theater AllStars	"Thank You! (765Theater Version)"
July 31, 2013	The Idolmaster Live Theater Performance 04	Megumi Tokoro (Yukiyo Fujii)	"After School Party Time"
July 31, 2013	The Idolmaster Live Theater Performance 04	Chihaya Kisaragi (Asami Imai), Shiho Kitazawa (Sora Amamiya), Kotoha Tanaka (Risa Taneda), and Megumi Tokoro (Yukiyo Fujii)	"Blue Symphony"
November 19, 2014	Amagi Brilliant Park Character Song Collection	Latifah Fleuranza (Yukiyo Fujii)	"Marginal Wonderland"
November 26, 2014	The Idolmaster Live Theater Harmony 06	Megumi Tokoro (Yukiyo Fujii)	"Frozen Word"
November 26, 2014	The Idolmaster Live Theater Harmony 06	Burning Girl [Kotoha Tanaka (Risa Taneda), Tamaki Ōgami (Eri Inagawa), Umi Kōsaka (Reina Ueda), Megumi Tokoro (Yukiyo Fujii), and Miya Miyao (Chōcho Kiritani)]	"Jireru Heart ni Hi wo Tsukete"
November 26, 2014	The Idolmaster Live Theater Harmony 06	Burning Girl [Kotoha Tanaka (Risa Taneda), Tamaki Ōgami (Eri Inagawa), Umi Kōsaka (Reina Ueda), Megumi Tokoro (Yukiyo Fujii), and Miya Miyao (Chōcho Kiritani)]	"Welcome!!"
April 4/5, 2015	The Idolmaster Live Theater Solo Collection Volume 1	Megumi Tokoro (Yukiyo Fujii)	"Jireru Heart ni Hi wo Tsukete"
