= Sailor Neptune =

Character from Sailor Moon

- Sailor Moon character
- Michiru in her Super Sailor Neptune form as seen in the 1990s anime
- First appearance: Sailor Moon chapter #27: "Infinity 1 – Premonition" (1994)
- Created by: Naoko Takeuchi
- Voiced by: Japanese: Masako Katsuki; Sayaka Ohara (Sailor Moon Crystal); English: Lauren Landa (Viz Media dub, Sailor Moon Crystal); Barbara Radecki (CWi dub)
- Birthday: March 6

In-universe information
- Full name: Michiru Kaiou
- Alias: Princess Neptune
- Weapon: Deep Aqua Mirror
- Significant other: Sailor Uranus
- Nationality: Japanese
- Affiliations: Sailor Guardians; Shadow Galactica
- Powers and abilities: Generation and manipulation of seawater, precognition, astral projection

Sailor Neptune (Japanese: セーラーネプチューン, Hepburn: Sērā Nepuchūn) is a fictional lead character in the Sailor Moon media franchise. Her alternate identity is Michiru Kaiou (海王 みちる, Kaiō Michiru; renamed "Michelle Kaioh" in some English adaptations), a teenage Japanese schoolgirl and violinist. Michiru is a member of the Sailor Guardians, female supernatural fighters who protect the Solar System from evil.

Introduced in the third story arc, Sailor Neptune fights alongside her partner and lover Sailor Uranus. In both versions of the story she is portrayed as elegant, sophisticated, capable of sharp anger, occasionally cold, and fully dedicated to her duty as a Sailor Guardian. She possesses powers associated with the sea, precognition, as well as powers granted by her magic mirror.

== Profile ==
Michiru with a cello, as drawn by Naoko Takeuchi

Michiru is formally introduced in the third story arc, although she appears in silhouette alongside Sailor Uranus in episode 89, a "teaser" to Sailor Moon S. She is portrayed as a very polite, calm character in the series. She dislikes being patronized even if not doing so would hurt her feelings, and subsequently will not indulge people. This is alluded to in her backstory, explaining that she was congenial but generally not social. Michiru is also graceful and delicate, with an aura of sophistication. She is clearly intelligent, and this usually manifests itself through art and music. Usagi (to whom this observation is especially relevant) once commented that Michiru was the ideal example of a princess. Michiru has short teal hair in a wavy style that reaches just past her shoulders. In her transformation sequence, she finishes with a hair toss/flip.

Michiru attends Mugen Academy with Haruka (and the younger Hotaru Tomoe) when she is first introduced. In the manga, after Mugen is destroyed, she and Haruka later attend the same high school as Usagi and the other girls. It is never mentioned where they go after this in the anime, but the two of them are shown driving away in their last appearance in Sailor Moon S, and during a made-for-TV special set during the following season, they are shown staying at a hotel elsewhere in Japan. According to the musicals, Michiru had experience studying abroad. Michiru's closest bond is with Haruka, and Takeuchi has explicitly stated that the two are in a lesbian relationship in both the manga and the anime as well as the musicals.

In the anime adaptation, Michiru briefly flirts with Seiya, at that time a man, asking him to help her unzip her dress. Her stated intention, earlier in the episode, is to learn Seiya's motives out of fear that he is a threat to the planet. This flirtation does not occur in the manga, where Seiya is always a female and plays a much more minor role. However, in the Infinity arc, Michiru appears as temptation for Mamoru, paralleling Haruka being used as temptation for Usagi. Though she never makes any of the advances on Mamoru that Haruka makes on Usagi, Usagi is jealous of her because she sees them together.

Michiru is deeply artistic and is the Sailor Soldier most associated with the arts. Her known skills include the violin, swimming, and painting; of all her skills, her strongest is as a violinist, which is also her greatest dream. She likes all her classes, especially music, and belongs to the music club at school as well as the swimming club. In the manga, she collects cosmetics; in the anime, she loves to swim, often using the water as a way to relax. Her favorite food is sashimi, while her least favorite is kikurage mushrooms. She also dislikes sea cucumbers for unclear reasons, and her favorite color is Marine blue.

== Aspects and forms ==
As a character with different incarnations, special powers, transformations and a long lifetime virtually spanned between the Silver Millennium era and the 30th century, Michiru gains multiple aspects and aliases as the series progresses.

=== Sailor Neptune ===
Michiru's Soldier identity. She wears a teal and cerulean uniform, and unlike most of the other Soldiers, her gloves extend only to her mid-forearms and has an 8 stars shaped jewel on her teal-colored choker. She wears planet shaped teal-colored earrings (which is the shape of Planet Neptune) but the earrings were absent in the 1992 version of Sailor Moon, and present in the Sailor Moon Crystal. She is given specific titles throughout the various series, including Soldier of the Deep Waters (or "Depths" in the English manga), Soldier of Embrace, Soldier of the Sea, and Soldier of Comprehension. Her personality is no different from when she is a civilian, although certain special abilities and powers are unavailable to her in her regular civilian form. Just like her partner, Haruka, Michiru has some precognitive abilities while in her normal form. She is able to prophetically predict who is likely to be the next target of the Death Busters.

Sailor Neptune uses ocean-based attacks (not just water), and carries one of three Talismans carried by the "outer" Sailor Soldiers; Neptune has the Deep Aqua Mirror, which always reveals the truth. She takes a black-and-white approach to her role as a Soldier, one shared by Sailor Uranus, who is virtually always at her side. As she grows stronger, Sailor Neptune gains additional unique special abilities, and at key points her uniform changes to reflect this. The first change takes place in Act 44 of the manga, when she obtains the Neptune Crystal and her outfit becomes similar to that of Super Sailor Moon. She is not given a new title. A similar event takes place in Episode 167 of the anime, and she is given the name Super Sailor Neptune. A third form appears in Act 49 of the manga, unnamed but similar to Eternal Sailor Moon (without wings). In the official visual book for Sailor Moon Eternal, this form was named "Eternal Sailor Neptune".

=== Princess Neptune ===
On Silver Millennium, Sailor Neptune was also the princess of her home planet. She was among those given the duty of protecting the Solar System from outside invasion. As Princess Neptune, she dwelt in Triton Castle and wore a sea-green gown. She appears in this form in the original manga Act 48, as well as in supplementary art. It is unknown whether she had a romantic relationship with Princess Uranus at that time.

== Special powers and items ==
Sailor Neptune using the Deep Aqua Mirror to perform Submarine Reflection in Sailor Moon Crystal

Even in civilian form, Michiru has some precognitive gifts, as she occasionally states that "the sea is stormy" when there is an evil presence at work. She is not shown using any other special powers in her civilian form, and must first transform into a Sailor Guardian by either raising her hand or using a special device called the Lip Rod in the anime and shouting a special phrase, originally "Neptune Planet Power, Make-up!" (Note: In the Cloverway dub, Michiru does not say 'Make up' when transforming, and the phrase "Neptune Star Power" is usually used instead.) In the manga she eventually gains her Neptune Crystal and this phrase changes to evoke Neptune Crystal Power. In the anime, although she does upgrade to Super Sailor Neptune, the Crystal is never mentioned and her transformation is never shown on screen after the upgrade. (Note: She does say the phrase "Neptune Crystal Power, Make up!" in her Sailor Moon Sailor Stars image prologue.)

Sailor Neptune's powers are inspired by Roman mythology, where Neptune is the god of the sea. She draws energy from the "deep waters" and blasts it at her foes. She is given three major attacks in the series, and although they all have English names (like those of the other Sailor Soldiers), each is also given kanji in the manga to denote the meaning to Japanese readers. For example, her first attack, Deep Submerge, (Note: In the Cloverway dub, the word Neptune is sometimes added at the beginning.) is given kanji which translate precisely to "deep" (深) and "submerge" (水没). The intended English pronunciation is given in furigana. This is Sailor Neptune's primary attack for most of the anime series.

In the manga, Michiru owns a special hand mirror which supplements her precognition. This turns out to be the Deep Aqua Mirror, one of three powerful Talismans, the other two of which are carried by Sailor Uranus and Sailor Pluto. In the anime, she does not gain the mirror until she is revealed as one of the Talisman bearers; in either case, it is used in her second attack, Submarine Reflection (深海鏡射; "deep sea mirror shoot"). In both the anime and manga, she can use it to launch an extremely powerful and devastating attack. In the anime, Michiru can also use it by dispelling illusions, as seen in Sailor Moon SuperS: The Movie. In the manga, she can also use it for astral projection, and lends it to Chibiusa while she and the other Outer Soldiers are away. Chibiusa invokes the Deep Aqua Mirror's strength and power by stating its name and is able to teleport to Sailor Neptune's location.

Michiru's violin, a Stradivarius worth some five hundred million yen, is called the Marine Cathédrale and is named after "the temple of the sea". Aside from playing it in concert, she uses it in her third and final attack, which, like the instrument itself, has a French-inspired name: Submarine Violon Tide (深海提琴潮流; "deep sea violin tide"). This third attack is only used in the manga, and was never shown in the anime. This attack is also used by the evil Sailor Neptune in Act 50, where it is renamed Galactica Violon Tide. The Neptune Crystal is perhaps her most important possession, as it is her Sailor Crystal and the source of all her power, which becomes especially important in the fifth story arc. It is given to her by Sailor Saturn.

By holding hands with the other Sailor Guardians in a circle, she can use Sailor Teleport or Sailor Planet Power Meditation. When she is controlled by Galaxia in the manga and Crystal, she and the other controlled Sailor Guardians perform Galactica Planet Attack.

== Development ==
The character of Sailor Neptune was not developed until partway through the Sailor Moon series, after the Sailor Soldiers were well-established. She was created in tandem with Sailor Uranus, as a pair of "complementary but opposite characters", and meant from the beginning to work alongside Sailor Pluto. Creator Naoko Takeuchi has said that she was shocked by the changes made to Michiru's personality in the anime series, but that she was glad fans still liked the character.

Sailor Neptune's visual design is intended to evoke images of her element, from the choice of colors to the wavy quality of her hair, which Takeuchi even joked might be thought of as seaweed hair. In street clothes, Michiru is supposed to be an "artist type" and to dress accordingly; in fact, initial drawings are extremely elegant and "adult", because she was originally intended to be involved in the all-female Takarazuka Revue with Haruka. Although this was not included in the series itself, Takeuchi stated in an interview that she feels Takarazuka is "the maximum level of feminine emancipation," that as such it was her inspiration for the character of Haruka, and that it seemed natural for Haruka to fall in love with another woman; namely Michiru.

The kanji of Michiru's surname translate as "sea" (海, kai) and "king" (王, ō). Together, they constitute most of the name of the planet Neptune in Japanese, Kaiōsei (海王星; "Sea King Star"). Her given name is in hiragana michiru (みちる) and so its meaning is not inherent, but the word itself means "to rise" (満). The packaging of Irwin dolls released in Canada in 1998 called Michiru by the name Nerissa.

=== Actresses ===
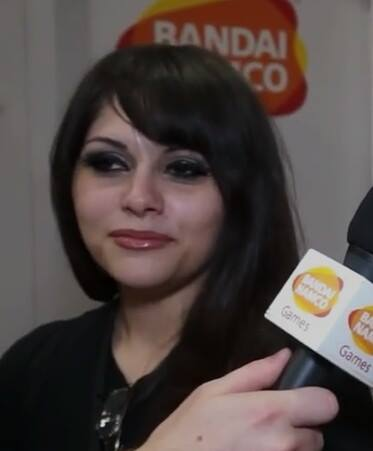
Lauren Landa is the voice of Michiru in the Viz Media dub.

In the Japanese anime series and movies, Michiru Kaioh is voiced by veteran voice actress Masako Katsuki. In the third season of Sailor Moon Crystal, she is voiced by Sayaka Ohara. In the original English dub her name is changed to "Michelle Kaioh" and her voice is provided by Barbara Radecki. Michiru is voiced by Lauren Landa in the Viz Media English dub.

In the stage musicals, Michiru has been played by ten actresses: Kaoru Sakamoto, Chikage Tomita, Miyuki Fuji, Hiroko Tahara, Sara Shimada, Yuhka Asami, Tomoko Inami, Takayo Oyama, Sayaka Fujioka and Ayana Kinoshita. Asami, the longest-running of these actresses, knew nothing about Sailor Moon when she was given a role in the musical, but came to greatly admire the character of Michiru after reading the manga and watching the anime. Nao Takagi, who played Sailor Uranus, has stated that certain scenes were specially created just for the two of them.

Michiru does not appear in the live-action series.

== Reception and influence ==
The official Sailor Moon popularity polls listed Michiru Kaiou and Sailor Neptune as separate characters. In 1994, with fifty one choices, Sailor Neptune was the seventh most popular character, receiving almost eight thousand votes more than Michiru, who was the ninth. In early 1996, with fifty one choices, Michiru was the sixteenth most popular character, and Neptune was the twenty second.

Fan fiction featuring Haruka and Michiru is among the most searched-for fan fiction on the Internet, and Erica Friedman of Yuricon has described Haruka and Michiru as being "one of the most romantic, funny, and fun yuri couples, ever." In her response to an academic essay on Sailor Moon by Mary Grigsby, author Emily Ravenwood compared Michiru and Haruka's relationship with Zoisite and Kunzite's relationship explaining that "in both cases, the feminine and masculine attributes are highlighted with a heavy hand (deliberate display of stereotypes)." According to her, the contrast between Michiru and Haruka, is not played so burlesque-ly as that of Zoisite and Kunzite, but still is extreme, with Haruka being the "perfect butch" while Michiru "is the classic high femme. She's beautiful, she's artistically talented, she's gracious and has exquisite manners, she even does things with her hair (the only character to do so in the whole show). She's never the one driving the car."

Venita Blackburn of The New York Times opined that Sailor Moon is a "transformative experience" about friendship and liberation that does not match the world's expectations of femininity, adding that its "iconic status" within the queer community was "no accident". She stated that the world of Sailor Moon is "interested in transformation, in upsetting expectations of presentation and value related to girlhood, masculinity, strength and gender roles", further adding that in Sailor Moon, the concept of transformation is "about light, magic and power hidden in the ordinariness of living", concluding that "there is nothing queerer than that".

=== Censorship ===
In an effort to avoid the controversy a lesbian character in a cartoon aimed towards a younger audience would cause, given the social mores, Haruka and Michiru's relationship has been censored in certain countries. In North America, the former English dub stated that Haruka and Michiru are cousins, even going so far as to occasionally state this through characters who should not know such information. However, whether in an attempt to be more faithful to the original Japanese or through failure to edit consistently, several episodes of the former English dub retained a noticeable amount of their casual flirting. Due to the censorship and problematic dubbing, some viewers inferred not only a homosexual relationship between the two girls, but also an incestuous one. It has even been implied that the difficulties in dubbing Haruka and Michiru's relationship are part of the reason why there was a gap of several years between the dubbing of the earlier series and the dubbing of Sailor Moon S. In Japan, there were also some controversies around the character.

Viz Media and Studiopolis' English-language redub of the series in 2016 would address the censorship issue by restoring any deleted scenes and preserving the integrity of the original Japanese scripts. In 2019, Viz Media released a new dub of Sailor Moon Sailor Stars, but in what they call a "translation error", they refer to Haruka and Michiru in a booklet as "friends" rather than a lesbian couple. The company later issued an apology on Twitter, in which they acknowledge that the two characters "are not friends, but in fact, partners."

== See also ==
- LGBT themes in comics
- Neptune in fiction
- Neptune (mythology)
- Poseidon
- Percy Jackson (character)
- Oceanus
- Abzu
- Susanoo-no-Mikoto
