= Dead Moon Circus =

Fictional characters from Sailor Moon

- The Dead Moon Circus. Left column: CereCere with Zircon, PallaPalla, JunJun, VesVes. Right column: Zeolite and Xenotime, Fisheye, Tiger's Eye, Hawk's Eye, Zirconia, Queen Nehelenia.

Publication information
- Publisher: Kodansha
- First appearance: Sailor Moon chapter #39: Dream 1 – Eclipse Dream (September 1995)
- Created by: Naoko Takeuchi

In-story information
- Base(s): Dead Moon circus tent
- Leader(s): Zirconia; Queen Nehelenia
- Member(s): Amazon Trio; Amazoness Quartet; Xenotime and Zeolite; Lemures

The Dead Moon Circus (Japanese: デッドムーンサーカス, Hepburn: Deddo Mūn Sākasu) are a group of fictional characters from the Sailor Moon manga series created by Naoko Takeuchi. They serve as the main antagonists of the fourth arc, called Dream in the manga, Sailor Moon SuperS in the first anime adaptation, and Sailor Moon Eternal in the second anime adaptation. They are first introduced in chapter #39 "Dream 1 – Eclipse Dream", originally published in Japan on September 6, 1995. In the original English dubbed anime by Cloverway, they are called the "Dark Moon Circus".

The Dead Moon Circus is led by the twisted Zirconia, in command by the absence of the dark Queen Nehelenia who is trapped within a mirror. Zirconia is searching for the legendary Golden Crystal, which will allow Nehelenia to break free of her entrapment and take over the Earth. They are the only group of villains with two subordinate groups: the Amazon Trio and the Amazoness Quartet.

== Key figures ==
=== Zirconia ===
Zirconia (ジルコニア, Jirukonia) appears as a hunching old woman with lavender skin who is revealed to be a be manifestation of Queen Nehelenia, overseeing the Dead Moon Circus in the real world. Her name is derived from the mineral Zirconium dioxide, which is often called Zirconia. Her connection to Nehelenia varies from version to version. In the Cloverway Inc. English-language adaptation, Zirconia's gender was changed from female to male, though the character's original depiction was maintained in the later Viz English-language adaptation. In the Materials Collection, Naoko Takeuchi mentions intentional insect-like elements in her design, possibly a reference to insect genus Nehalennia.

Zirconia communicates with Nehelenia and delivers her orders to the Amazoness Quartet. When Sailor Saturn and Sailor Chibi Moon begin to break through Zirconia's influence on the Quartet, Zirconia captures all of them, imprisoning the Quartet inside four magic balls and Saturn and Chibi Moon within two shards of broken mirror. She sends the objects through the mirror to Nehelenia. When the Sailor Guardians confront her, she rises into the sky and grows in size, but the Sailor Guardians use Sailor Planet Power Meditation to defeat her. Zirconia escapes into Nehelenia's mirror with Sailor Moon in pursuit, Zirconia remaining within it and likely ceasing to exist upon the mirror being destroyed during Nehelenia's demise.

In the anime, Zirconia serves as the queen's representative in directing their followers on missions to find Pegasus in the beautiful dreams of people in Tokyo. While the Amazon Trio feared her, Zirconia has trouble keeping the Amazoness Quartet in line. When the Quartet begins to develop sympathy for the Sailor Guardians and destroy their balls, Zirconia escapes to Nehelenia's mirror. Though able to break Queen Nehelenia free from her mirror, Zirconia is destroyed upon serving her purpose.

Zirconia is voiced by Hisako Kyōda and Naomi Watanabe in the Crystal film, Sailor Moon Eternal. In the Cloverway English adaptation she is voiced by Robert Bockstael voice-matching Frank Oz and her gender is changed to male. In the Viz Media English adaptation and the Netflix English dub of Sailor Moon Eternal Pt. 1 and 2, she is voiced by Barbara Goodson.

=== Queen Nehelenia ===
Queen Nehelenia (女王ネヘレニア, Joō Neherenia), leader of the Dead Moon Circus, is named after the ancient goddess Nehalennia. Nehelenia is like the dark mirror image of Queen Serenity; the self-styled Queen of the dark center of the Moon that existed since Silver Millennium who possesses the ability to inflict powerful curses. She made herself known at the celebration of Princess Serenity's birth, the confrontation that followed ending with Queen Serenity sealing Nehelenia within a mirror. Nehelenia used her final moments of freedom to curse the Moon Kingdom to fall before Princess Serenity could take the throne, making her the cause of Silver Millennium's destruction. With the Moon Kingdom no more, as she used a solar eclipse to breach her seal, Nehelenia decided to focus on conquering Earth. Several millennia later, taking the Sailor Quartet to serve her as the Amazoness Quartet, Nehelenia conquers Elysion before sending the Dead Moon Circus to defeat the Sailor Guardians and retrieve the Silver Crystal from Sailor Moon.

Once the Sailor Guardians managed to defeat all of the minions, Nehelenia makes her presence known as she confronts the Sailor Guardians in Elysion and takes the Silver Crystal. But Nelehenia loses the crystal when its power combined with Tuxedo Mask's newly awakened Golden Crystal prevented this yet again. Nehelenia is destroyed by Eternal Sailor Moon using the joined powers of all the Sailor Team, shrivelling into a wizened old woman resembling Zirconia before she and her mirror dissolve into dust that is sealed within the eclipse once more. It is revealed towards the end of the series that Nehelenia is just an incarnation of Chaos, the ultimate antagonist of the series.

In the anime, Nelehenia was revealed to have been a queen of her own kingdom and adored by her people. Due to her having no real friends or loved ones in her childhood, Nehelenia learned to love herself, which led to her vanity, which played into her madness when she asked an enchanted mirror to show her future and saw herself as an old hag. As a result, Nelehenia became obsessed with the notion of keeping herself young and beautiful so she consumed the dreams of her subjects, who became Lemures, and founded the Dead Moon Circus. Nelehenia sought the Golden Crystal possessed by Helios, who escaped her in the form of Pegasus, only to be later sealed by Queen Serenity within her mirror. To rectify her condition, during the events of the SuperS series, Nelehenia creates Zirconia to lead the Dead Moon Circus to hunt down Pegasus. Eventually learning of Helios's close friendship with Chibiusa, Nehelenia realizes that she is the holder of the Golden Dream Mirror that Pegasus is inhabiting. Once obtaining the Golden Crystal, Nelehenia breaks from her mirror and attempts to use its power, but the Amazoness Quartet steal it to give it to the Sailor Guardians who, along with the people of Earth, break Nehelenia's spell and reveal her true aged form. Nehelenia re-enters her imprisonment within the mirror to restore her youthful appearance.

In Sailor Stars, Nelehenia serves as the main antagonist of the first quarter when she is freed from the mirror by Sailor Galaxia and encouraged to annihilate the Sailor Guardians and to exact her revenge through the shards of her Black Mirror. Among the victims is Mamoru, rendered emotionally dead. After dragging Mamoru into her nightmare dimension, Nelehenia captures all the Sailor Guardians before revealing her tragic past to a powerless Usagi. However, Nehelenia is ultimately redeemed by the Sailor Guardians' forgiveness, and reborn as a small child. Signs point to her having learned her lesson, as she is seen making an effort to become close to her subjects as true friends.

In the original Japanese series, Nehelenia is voiced by Yoshiko Sakakibara while her purified reincarnated child version is voiced by Wakana Yamazaki. In Sailor Moon Eternal, she is voiced by Nanao. In the Cloverway English adaptation, her voice is supplied by Kate Trotter. In the Viz Media English adaptation and the Netflix English dub of Sailor Moon Eternal Pt. 1 and 2, she is voiced by Laura Post. In the musicals, Nehelenia is portrayed by Kaori Ishikawa.

== Amazon Trio ==
The Amazon Trio (アマゾントリオ, Amazon Torio) consists of Fish Eye, Tiger's Eye, and Hawk's Eye. They are circus animals transformed into men by the Amazoness Quartet to destroy the Sailor Guardians. They each respectively target a relevant Guardian to kill; the only exception to this is Sailor Venus, who is targeted by Xenotime and Zeolite. While commenting on their looks, series creator Naoko Takeuchi says all three members of the trio show some ambiguity.

In the anime, the Amazon Trio's job is to look into the dream mirrors of mortals, searching for the legendary and powerful Pegasus. The Trio choose their victims by seducing various women and men, whether they be young or old, and attacking them while they are vulnerable. Rather than being killed by the Sailor Guardians like in the manga, the Amazon Trio share a different fate in the anime. After their many failures, Zirconia reveals to them their true natures (those of animals), and while she sends them to steal Usagi's dream mirror, she instructs PallaPalla to send a clown-like Lemures called Mr. Magic Pierrot to finish them. After Usagi's mirror is restored and Mr. Magic Pierrot is defeated, Pegasus grants the Amazon Trio dream mirrors, knowing that the trio have suffered greatly and have truly changed for the better. They cannot, however, retain their current forms as humans and are taken away by Pegasus to the Crystal Forest. As he places them within the forest, he promises that one day they will be reborn as the humans they wish to be, with their beautiful dreams intact.

In the musical Shin Densetsu Kourin, Sailor Galaxia recruits them as her minions. However, in the second stage of the musical, they change their minds and join Sailor Moon instead; since the Sailor Starlights do not appear in this musical, the task of protecting her after the deaths of the Sailor Guardians is taken by the Amazon Trio.

=== Tiger's Eye ===
Tiger's Eye (タイガーズ・アイ, Taigāzu Ai) was a tiger turned into a human by Zirconia. His name is based on the quartz Tiger's eye. He takes the form of a tall, long haired blond man. He wears tight tiger-striped pants and a white top, and attacks with a whip.

Tiger's Eye, in animal form, first assisted PallaPalla and VesVes in flushing out Usagi and Chibiusa when the latter's attempt of returning to her time is detected. He later gains human form and assists PallaPalla by subjecting Sailor Mars with her nightmare while she investigates a mysterious hall of mirrors. He is killed when Rei gains her 'Super' form, using her Mars Flame Sniper attack on him. Sailor Moon Eternal has Tiger's Eye's dream of becoming an artist and he retains his human form even after Rei uses her "Exorcised Charm", attack on him.

In the anime, his targets of seduction are particularly younger women, as he uses his charming abilities to lure them into his traps until the right time to look into their dream mirrors in search of Pegasus. Tiger's Eye is killed when he and Fish's Eye relinquish their power to rebuild Usagi's destroyed Dream Mirror. However, Pegasus revives him and he is sent to Elysion with the others.

In the original anime adaptation, his voice actor is Ryōtarō Okiayu, while Satoshi Hino voices him in the Crystal film, Sailor Moon Eternal. In the Cloverway English adaptation, he is voiced by Jason Barr. In the Viz Media English adaptation and the Netflix English dub of Sailor Moon Eternal Pt. 1 and 2, he is voiced by John Eric Bentley. In the stage musicals, he is played by Ryuji Kasahara.

=== Hawk's Eye ===
Hawk's Eye (ホークス・アイ, Hōkusu Ai) was a hawk that was turned into a human by Zirconia. He takes the form of a tall young man with bright, wild pink hair. He wears a bra-like toga and tights in his battle attire. Creator Naoko Takeuchi characterized Hawk's Eye as a sort of grown-up Zoisite, with the dream of someday being a "bar madam" in either Las Vegas or Ginza.

Hawk's Eye deceives Makoto by pretending to be a female owner of a herb store, referred in non-binary terms in Sailor Moon Eternal, to give her and Chibiusa rings to inflict them with nightmares. But Makoto gains her 'Super Sailor Jupiter' form and kills Hawk's Eye with Jupiter Oak Evolution. Sailor Moon Eternal builds up Hawk's Eye's demise in accepting it as he realized his dream and uses his last moments to tell Sailor Jupiter to realize her dreams out of respect.

In the 90s anime, he often gets into fights with Tiger's Eye, though their relationship is rather love-hate, and their arguments are usually playful. His attacks are fire-based, and uses a torch as his primary weapon. His targets reflect his romantic preferences, in this case older women (to contrast with Tiger's Eye's preference for younger girls). He first appears in episode 128 of the anime but his first offensive move is made in episode 130, his victim being Usagi's mother, Ikuko Tsukino. Hawk's Eye is killed by the lemures Mr. Magic Pierrot, who is sent by PallaPalla to eliminate the trio. However, Pegasus revives him and he is sent to Elysion with the others.

He is voiced by Toshio Furukawa in the original anime adaptation, while Toshiyuki Toyonaga voices him in the Crystal film, Sailor Moon Eternal. In the Cloverway English adaptation, he is voiced by Benji Plener. In the Viz Media English adaptation and the Netflix English dub of Sailor Moon Eternal Pt. 1 and 2, he is voiced by Michael Yurchak. He is played by Hikari Ono in the stage musicals.

=== Fish Eye ===
Fish Eye (フィッシュ・アイ, Fisshu Ai) is a lionfish that was turned into a human by Zirconia. He takes the form of a slender, effeminate man with long, pale blue and green hair. In some disguises, he is styled with some hairdos such as a ponytail. In the Materials Collection, creator Naoko Takeuchi describes him as the Circus's "ball-balancing girl (??)", who one day dreams of becoming the "best ball-balancing girl (!) in the world"; emphasis is hers. She also compares his temperament to that of the excitable Mimete.

Fish Eye has a very small part in the manga, in which he is sold to Ami Mizuno in fish form. He gives her nightmares about her father abandoning her, luring her into a trap. She powers up and defeats Fish Eye with Mercury Aqua Rhapsody, and he is killed soon after by Sailor Moon and Sailor Chibi Moon.

In the anime, he is called "Fish's Eye", and like Tiger's Eye and Hawk's Eye, he targets his ideal romantic interests, which are young males. His magical attacks are water-based, but his primary choice of attack is knife-throwing (which, to his frustration, he is not very good at). Crossdressing is the basis of many of his disguises, as he is usually able to pass himself off as a woman to attract his targets, who are generally heterosexual males (he portrayed his gender honestly to the one gay target he had). Undisguised, he speaks Japanese with exclusively masculine pronouns, such as boku when referring to himself. Fish Eye is the first of the three to wonder if what they are doing is right, and his wavering loyalty lands him in hot water when he is nearly killed by Zirconia. Fish Eye was killed when he and Tiger's Eye gave up their power to rebuild Usagi's destroyed Dream Mirror. However, Pegasus revives him, and he is sent to Elysion with the others, given the promise of rebirth as real humans.

Fish Eye was changed to a woman in Cloverway's English dub of the anime, which is not unprecedented within this adapted series: Zoisite and Zirconia also had their genders changed. However, the female Fisheye's voice seemed to waver between effeminacy and boyishness, and the TV version of the dub slightly edited a fairly noticeable scene in which Fisheye is seen without a shirt— the chest was placed off-camera. In the uncut DVD, the many references to Fisheye as female are retained, but the scenes showing "her" as a shirtless man are still shown. Fisheye merely claims that "she's" not like other women.

He is voiced by Akira Ishida in the original anime adaptation, while Shouta Aoi voices him in the Crystal film, Sailor Moon Eternal. In the Cloverway English adaptation, Fisheye's voice is supplied by Deborah Drakeford. In the Viz Media English adaptation and the Netflix English dub of Sailor Moon Eternal Pt. 1 and 2, he is voiced by Erik Scott Kimerer. In the stage musicals, Fisheye is portrayed by female actresses Tae Kimura and Midori Ichige.

== Amazoness Quartet ==
The Amazoness Quartet (アマゾネス・カルテット, Amazonesu Karutetto) (Note: This group-name is sometimes rendered as Amazoness Quartetto by English-speaking fans, but the romanization of their name can be seen on Japanese merchandise. They are called the Amazoness because they are girls from the Amazon rainforest; they are not Amazon warrior women.) are the four young girls CereCere, PallaPalla, JunJun, and VesVes. Their attacks are derived from circus skills, with each having a specific talent. In the manga, they also created and commanded the Amazon Trio to attack the Sailor Guardians, whereas in the anime the Trio came before the Quartet and served Zirconia. In the Cloverway English adaptation, they are called the "Amazon Quartet".

The Sailor Quartet as they appear in Sailor Moon Eternal. Left to right: Sailor Vesta, Sailor Juno, Sailor Pallas, and Sailor Ceres.

They are actually the Sailor Quartet—commonly referred to in English-speaking fandom as the "Asteroid Guardians", because they are named after the first four major asteroids to be discovered (Ceres, Pallas, Juno, Vesta). The four asteroids hold particular importance because they were originally considered planets in history before more were discovered. They had been placed in a deep sleep somewhere within the Amazon Jungle, awaiting the time when they could become the future protectors of Sailor Chibi Moon, analogous to Princess Serenity's four Inner Guardians and to Prince Endymion's Four Kings of Heaven. However, Queen Nehelenia woke them prematurely and forced them to work for her. At her defeat, they are returned to their true forms by Usagi (in the form of Neo-Queen Serenity) and to their long sleep. During the fifth story arc, they accompany Sailor Chibi Moon from the future to help in the fight against Shadow Galactica. The Sailor Quartet's uniforms are a cross between those worn by the Sailor Team in their first forms and their final forms, with the Quartet's own image colors. They are shown using two attacks as a group: Pink Ladies Freezing Kiss (all four of them plus Sailor Chibi Moon) and Amazoness Jungle Arrow (used by the four Quartet members).

In the anime, the Quartet's history of being Sailor Guardians is never shown to viewer and the story is followed after they are captured by Queen Nehelenia and is already a part of her Dead Moon Circus. They begin working for Queen Nehelenia after she appears inside a magical mirror after hearing the Amazoness Quartet playing in a forest, and then offered to keep the Amazoness Quartet from ever growing old in return. Nehelenia changed their dreams into the physical form of Amazon Stones, instructing them to use these to remove the "dream mirrors" of humans. The Quartet also use the Amazon Stones for other attacks. They are dedicated to this task, but still generally spend more time playing than working.

The Quartet appears in several of the stage musicals, with a substantially different background. Here they are homunculus created by Professor Tomoe, and are known as the Samael Quartet. They are portrayed as young children around Chibiusa's apparent age, instead of their normal ages. They are created from Chibiusa's starseed, and are linked to her, having the power to transform into Sailor Guardians as a result.

=== CereCere ===
CereCere (セレセレ, SereSere) is the pink haired, and most mature acting member of the Quartet. Known as the Flower Magician, she is a trapeze artist for the Circus and is the leader of the Quartet. She is very feminine and tries to be mature compared to the others in the Quartet. Her Sailor Guardian counterpart is Sailor Venus, and her colors are pink and yellow. Her hair is decorated in bows and a flower. Takeuchi has stated that CereCere is sexy and talks in a very aristocratic tone. She is the eldest sister, which corresponds to the order of discovery of the asteroid she is named after – Ceres, which would later be classified as a dwarf planet. Later in the manga it is revealed that she is actually Sailor Ceres (セーラーセレス, Sērā Seresu), one of the four protectors of Chibiusa. In the manga, she is the only member of the Quartet not to use any attacks or spells.

In the anime, CereCere tends to be arrogant and haughty, and chases after people that will highlight her perceived beauty for her, such as when she chased after an artist and asked him to repaint her. She also appears extravagant and outrageous while disguised and not in her circus uniform. However, there are moments when she breaks the mature mask and plays for fun. The other Amazonesses see her as lazy, and take every opportunity to call her such. CereCere summons only plant-based lemures, a possible nod to her Roman namesake Ceres, a goddess of vegetation and plants.

In the anime series, her voice actress is Yuri Amano, and Reina Ueda voices her in the Crystal film, Sailor Moon Eternal. In the Cloverway English adaptation, her name is changed to "Selesele" and she is voiced by Megan McChesney. In the Viz Media English adaptation and the Netflix English dub of Sailor Moon Eternal Pt. 1 and 2, she is voiced by Cassandra Lee Morris. In the musicals, she is played by Shiori Eguchi and Risa Honma, the latter of whom later went on to play Sailor Mars.

=== PallaPalla ===
PallaPalla (パラパラ, ParaPara) is the blue-haired, childlike member of the Quartet. She uses ball-based attacks. She is called the Magician of Balancing Balls. Her Sailor Guardian counterpart is Sailor Mercury, and her color is blue. Takeuchi listed her as being a bimbo, childish but yet smart. She is the second sister, which corresponds to the number of her asteroid, Pallas. She was also named after the Greek goddess Pallas Athena. In the manga, it's revealed that she is actually Sailor Pallas (セーラーパラス, Sērā Parasu), one of the four protectors of Chibiusa.

In the anime, she speaks in third person and is equally childish as she is in the manga. Nevertheless, she shows some signs of cleverness, such as pointing out that the arrangement of the curtains is wrong in one episode (when no one else saw it), setting up a popular dentist office in another, and using a doll to manipulate the Sailor Guardians in yet another. The other Amazonesses think she is very dangerous; in one episode she rips the head off her own doll as a cure for its toothache. She often summons ball-like lemures or uses dolls as part of her attacks, and likes to attack groups of people rather than one at a time. All of the Lemures she summons have two faces, a good one and an evil one, reflecting her own dual nature.

She is voiced by Machiko Toyoshima in the original anime, and by Sumire Morohoshi in the Crystal film, Sailor Moon Eternal. In the Cloverway English adaptation, her name is changed to "Parapara" and her voice is supplied by Jen Gould. In the Viz Media English adaptation and the Netflix English dub of Sailor Moon Eternal Pt. 1 and 2, she is voiced by Xanthe Huynh. In the musicals, she is played by Kurumi Nishijima and Seira Saeki.

=== JunJun ===
JunJun (ジュンジュン, JunJun) is the green-haired tomboy of the Quartet. She is athletic and somewhat impulsive. JunJun is referred to as the Magician of Acrobatic Feats. Her Sailor Guardian counterpart is Sailor Jupiter, and her color is green. She is described by Takeuchi as a vulgar "Yankee"—Japanese slang for a delinquent or rebellious youth—and uses very informal male speech. She is also said to have dark skin and is the third sister, which corresponds to the number of her asteroid. She was supposed to ride a motorcycle. In the manga it is revealed that she is really Sailor Juno (セーラージュノー, Sērā Junō), named for the asteroid Juno and the Roman goddess Juno.

In the anime, she often speaks with a hard edge. She tends to dress in biker outfits outside of her circus uniform even though she is never shown to ride a motorbike. She likes to let her targets attain their dreams before she takes their dream mirrors which may be an oddball reference to the mothering aspect of the goddess Juno. She always summons male lemures; the only one of the Quartet to do so.

She is voiced by Kumiko Watanabe, and by Yuuko Hara in the Crystal film, Sailor Moon Eternal. In the Cloverway English adaptation, Junjun is the only member of the Quartet to retain her original name and her voice actor was Brandi Ward. In the Viz Media English adaptation and the Netflix English dub of the Eternal Movies, she is voiced by Erika Ishii. In the musicals she is played by Hitomi Tomashino and Niki Ajima.

=== VesVes ===
VesVes (ベスベス, BesuBesu) is the red-haired aggressive member of the Quartet. She is loud, brash, and somewhat violent. VesVes is known as the Magician of Beasts. Her Sailor Guardian counterpart is Sailor Mars, and her color is red. She carries a whip and her hair is tied up in a high ponytail which makes her distinguished from the other members of the Quartet. She is listed as being a "Queen" and having a darker skin color than JunJun. She is the youngest of the Amazoness Quartet. In the manga it is revealed that she is really Sailor Vesta (セーラーベスタ, Sērā Besuta) named after the asteroid Vesta and the Roman goddess Vesta. In Act 39/45 ("Dream 7"), she uses "Steel Ball" to send knives at the Sailor Guardians.

In the anime, VesVes can appear to lack a sense of reality, rushing into things without realizing what she is doing. She is not as picky about her targets as the other three. She tends to command lemures that are animal-themed. VesVes has the most appearances in the anime out of the four.

Junko Hagimori provides her voice in the original anime series, and Rie Takahashi in the Crystal film, Sailor Moon Eternal. In the Cloverway English adaptation, her name is changed to "Besubesu"/"Vesuvesu" and she is voiced by Karyn Dwyer. In the Viz Media English adaptation and the Netflix English dub of Sailor Moon Eternal Pt. 1 and 2, she is voiced by Erica Lindbeck. In the musicals, she is played by Miho Suzuki.

== Servants ==
=== Zircon ===
Zircon (ジルコン, Jirukon) is Zirconia's companion and tool, a flaming eyeball with wings. In the beginning, it simply floats around her staff, but later can fly anywhere, and Zirconia uses it to gather images of those with beautiful dreams. She also uses it as a weapon, or to spy on her underlings. When Zircon is hit hard, any images it has gathered but not yet presented become distorted. It can also be used as a weapon with which to remove a human's Dream Mirror, similar to the Amazon Stones of the Quartet.

=== Xenotime and Zeolite ===
Xenotime (ゼノタイム, Zenotaimu) and Zeolite (ゼオライト, Zeoraito) are knife-throwing twins who, after the failures of the Amazon Trio, volunteer their services to the Amazoness Quartet. Xenotime, disguised as a talent scout, invites Minako to a fake idol audition set up by the twins and the Quartet in which the participants must undertake a 'survival audition' in a jungle setting. The participants, encouraged by the folk of the Dead Moon, become aggressive and fall prey to the Lemures but Sailors Mercury, Mars and Jupiter intervene before the same can happen to Minako, who has not received a power-up. Xenotime and Zeolite attack all four by throwing knives at them and commanding Lemures. When Minako attains her Super form, she destroys both twins with Venus Love And Beauty Shock.

Xenotime and Zeolite are voiced by Yōhei Azakami and Ryōhei Arai respectively in the two-part Crystal film Sailor Moon Eternal. Todd Haberkorn and Ezra Weisz voice them respectively in the Netflix English dub.

== Lemures ==
In the manga, the Lemures (レムレス, Remuresu) are physical incarnations of nightmares conjured by the Amazoness Quartet, in the form of small, dark, round, fuzzy creatures. They do not act independently and members of the Dead Moon Circus would call upon large groups of them to attack their victims and drain their energy.

In the anime, both the Amazon Trio and Amazoness Quartet summon Lemures from their own shadows to assist them in various battles with the Sailor Guardians (mostly using them to fight their battles entirely for them) when on the quest to target people's Dream Mirrors in order to find the Golden Dream Mirror that contains dreams beautiful enough for Pegasus to hide in it. The anime presents them as what remains of Queen Nehelenia's subjects after she took their dream mirrors to stay young. Each member of the Trio and Quartet seems to follow a basic theme with the Lemures they summon in both appearance and naming. The majority of the Lemures seen in the anime are female, but Fisheye and JunJun summon male Lemures instead. In the first six episodes of Sailor Stars, Nehelenia uses Mirror Paredri (ミラー・パレドリ, Mirā paredori), glass replicas of herself that are formed from shards of her own shattered dream mirror, to attack the Sailor Guardians.

In the Pretty Soldier Sailor Moon SuperS ~ Dream Guardians – Love – Into Eternity... musical, a group of clown-like Lemures called Pierrot appeared. Some of them are loyal to Zirconia, while others work under the Amazon Trio. In Pretty Soldier Sailor Moon ~ Beginning of the New Legend, three individual Lemures named Dark Moon, Lemures, and Nightmare appear as subordinates of the Amazon Trio. These three Lemures are also made members of Shadow Galactica in Shin Densetsu Kourin, when Sailor Galaxia forced the Amazon Trio into her service. Dark Moon, Lemures, and Nightmare are respectively portrayed by Ado Endou, Miwa Takanashi, and Miki Kawasaki.

"Lemures" is the singular form of the word as well as the plural. In the Cloverway English adaptation, the creatures are renamed Remless (meaning creatures who lost their dreams), possibly a reference to the REM cycle of sleep, during which dreams occur.

== Reception ==
While reviewing shinto, feminism and anime, author Sarah Reeves considered that Queen Nehelenia's overall misconduct and strategies are the result of a lack of husband and children. In her response to an academic essay on Sailor Moon by Mary Grigsby, author Emily Ravenwood noted the feminine traits of the members of the Amazon Trio, with Hawk's Eye having "what look remarkably like breasts under that little chest toga", Tiger's Eye having "some noticeable hips", and Fisheye being "the most ambiguous; he looks feminine but is also far too aggressive to fit the typical parameters of femme." Bandai introduced a line of little dolls that included the Amazoness Quartet and, according to Takeuchi, these were their favorite because "with their costumes and faithfulness to the originals, the dolls really excelled."

In her review of the Sailor Moon SuperS English dubbed blu-ray for Anime News Network, writer Rebecca Silverman described the Dead Moon Circus as a visually interesting element. The Lemures were praised, while the Amazon Trio were described as "the real saving grace of this season", no matter in which language the viewer is watching the series. Regarding the English dub itself, Silverman said John Eric Bentley as Tiger's Eye was the highlight. While analyzing the Amazon Trio's outfits, the author wrote they "might leave a little something to be desired," with Hawk's Eye in particular being portrayed masculine despite wearing a skirt, which is "relatively progressive for the time."

Rosie Knight from IGN wrote in her review of Sailor Moon Eternal that the franchise is known for its "outrageous villains" and that the viewers "get plenty of them as the Dead Moon Circus begins to attack the Guardians both mentally and physically." Several reviews focused on Dead Moon's ability to attack the Guardians by exploiting their deepest fears, with Jade Gomez from Paste stating that Zirconia sends the Amazon Trio "to get inside the minds of the Sailors to take them down", Victoria L. Johnson from Polygon describing how the Guardians "are attacked by the Dead Moon Circus, who prey on their false fears and real insecurities," or Arius Raposas from Medium writing that "the original four (Mercury, Venus, Mars, Jupiter) ... were tormented by the Dead Moon Circus in their attempt to trim down the forces of Princess Serenity." Michael Mammano from Den of Geek praised the Viz dub cast of John Eric Bentley, Michael Yurchak, and Erik Scott Kimerer as the members of the Amazon Trio. By contrast, Lynzee Loveridge from Anime News Network wrote a less positive review of the film and noted that the Dead Moon Circus is the films' "biggest casualty", which also applies to all previous villains' groups from Sailor Moon Crystal, since the manga did not dedicate time to develop secondary villains like the Amazon Trio. Regarding the Amazoness Quartet, she noted that there is "little distinction between their personalities or powers", and described the final battle against Nehelenia as lacking tension and payoff. However, Loveridge "enjoyed how [Nehelenia]'s presence shaped events as far back as season one."
