= Chibiusa =

Character in the Sailor Moon franchise

Sailor Chibi Moon
- Sailor Moon character
- Chibiusa in her Super Sailor Chibi Moon form as seen in the anime
- First appearance: Sailor Moon chapter #14: "Conclusion and Commencement, Petite Étrangere" (1993)
- Created by: Naoko Takeuchi
- Voiced by: Japanese: Kae Araki; Misato Fukuen (Sailor Moon Crystal); English: Tracey Hoyt (DiC dub); Elizabeth Saunders (Wicked Lady; DiC dub); Stephanie Beard (CWi dub); Sandy Fox (Viz Media dub)

In-universe information
- Full name: Princess Usagi Small Lady Serenity
- Aliases: Usagi Tsukino; Black Lady; Wicked Lady (DiC Dub)
- Nicknames: Chibiusa; Rini (DiC/Cloverway dub)
- Family: Neo-Queen Serenity (mother); King Endymion (father)
- Relatives: Tsukino family; Kousagi Tsukino (Parallel Universe sister; side story only)
- Affiliations: Sailor Guardians; Sailor Quartet; Black Moon Clan (as Black Lady)

Chibiusa (Japanese: ちびうさ, Hepburn: Chibiusa or Chibi-Usa; renamed Rini in the DiC and Cloverway English adaptations) is one of the main characters from the Sailor Moon manga series created by Naoko Takeuchi. She is introduced in Chapter 14, "Conclusion and Commencement, Petite Étrangere", first published in Nakayoshi on July 6, 1993. She is a small child from the 30th century who time travels to the past to seek help from the Sailor Guardians. She later returns, a few years older, in order to train as a Sailor Guardian herself; Sailor Chibi Moon (セーラーちびムーン, Sērā Chibi Mūn), translated as Sailor Mini Moon in the DIC and Cloverway English adaptations.

Chibiusa's birth name and official title is Princess Usagi Small Lady Serenity (プリンセス・うさぎS(スモール)L(レディ)セレニティ; Purinsesu Usagi Sumōru Redi Sereniti). She is adopted as a member of her mother's family, using the alias Usagi Tsukino, in the 20th century. She is given her nickname to differentiate from the older Usagi Tsukino (Sailor Moon). The nickname is a portmanteau of chibi (meaning 'small person' or 'small child') and her given name, Usagi.

== Development ==
Adding in Usagi's child to the Sailor Moon storyline, as well as her name, Chibiusa for a chibi (little) Usagi, was the idea of Naoko Takeuchi's editor, Fumio Osano. Takeuchi has stated that she did not think much about how Chibiusa's hair would look, besides it having odango like Usagi's hair and being pink; and that she used a Chibiusa doll for reference on the hair.

The first appearance of Chibiusa as a Sailor Guardian is in a side story, a year and a half before Sailor Chibi Moon made her debut in the manga. In the first Picture Diary, Chibiusa is rescued by Sailor Moon and Venus and dreams that night about becoming a "soldier of love and justice" herself. She calls herself "Sailor Chibiusa Moon" and appears in a uniform slightly different from the one she wears later, most notably including a cape.

Takeuchi struggled with a name for Black Lady, initially calling her "the Black Queen" and retaining her childlike appearance. Takeuchi also noted that the leg-slit on Black Lady's dress was even more revealing in the anime than in the manga, something which shocked her as she had wondered if the slit was going too far in her drawings of Black Lady.

== Profile ==
Author Naoko Takeuchi describes Chibiusa as a precocious person who likes pulling pranks. She is the daughter of Neo-Queen Serenity and King Endymion. Her real name is Princess Usagi Small Lady Serenity, but she is called Chibiusa because when she first appears, (at least in the anime,) she says her name is Usagi and she is like a chibi Usagi. Hence, Chibiusa. Silver Millennium was a matriarchy, which is why Chibiusa has Tsukino as her surname rather than Chiba. Besides that Mamoru wanted her to take Usagi's name rather than his own, as he had absolutely no attachment to his surname.

Her name in several English-language versions of Sailor Moon, Rini, is a diminutive of "Serena", the name of her mother. She is known for having pink hair put into a unique style that resembles rabbit ears on top of her head. Chibiusa's hair is apparently truly pink, and not just colored that way for stylistic purposes; its color is stated in the manga's first Picture Diary and in the poem about her in the Sailor Stars CD single.

=== Age ===
Usagi "Chibiusa" Tsukino in her 20th century casual wear, as drawn by Naoko Takeuchi

Exposure to the Silver Crystal renders all of Crystal Tokyo's inhabitants functionally immortal, and her frequent time traveling further complicates approximation of her age.

Chibiusa is five years old approximate in both civil registration and physical appearance; however, she possesses a degree of intellectual maturity that is normally non-existent in a five-year-old girl. In act 20 of the manga, it is stated that she is chronologically 900 years old, which lends credibility to her apparent wisdom, maturity, and rather serious personality over her teenage biological mother Usagi (in the 20th century). Her youthful appearance attributed to the fact that her physical body inexplicably halted its natural aging process when she was five. The reason for this is assumed to be caused by having not "awakened" as a Sailor Guardian, which eventually occurred when she first became Sailor Chibi Moon.

The candles on a birthday cake in one memory indicate that she is about five years old when first introduced. By the time of the Dream story arc, she claims to be 902. In Sailor Moon Crystal, it is stated clearly that she is 900 years old. She seems to be the equivalent of a 7 or 8 year old when she returns later. In the manga, after the Infinity story arc, it's mentioned she is in second grade; in the Stars story arc, she is in sixth grade; in the Parallel Sailor Moon story arc, she is in the ninth grade. The 1990s anime does not address Chibiusa's age, making her chronological age ambiguous in that adaptation.

=== Relationships ===
Chibiusa's affections come into conflict. Despite being self-aware of the fact that Usagi Tsukino and Mamoru Chiba are her biological parents, she does not immediately identify them as such, instead suspiciously viewing them as strangers who look like them. There is evidence that Chibiusa has a hard time identifying Usagi and Mamoru as being her parents due to observing a sharp contrast in personality between their "immature" present selves and their "wise" future selves. However, it is worth mentioning their forms Neo Queen Serenity and King Endymion are centuries into the future, leaving enough time for the couples' personalities to mature. She also reacts differently toward Usagi and Mamoru than she does towards King Endymion and Neo Queen Serenity, being more respectful to the latter but more spontaneous to the former; it is not clear if she prefers one set over the other. Chibiusa develops an electra complex towards her teenage father Mamoru (in the 20th century) and always refers to him as Mamo-chan—an affectionate nickname by Usagi—much to Usagi's fury and expense. This attraction does not transfer towards their future selves.

In the anime, she often berates Usagi for being clumsy and irresponsible. In Sailor Moon SuperS: The Movie, she describes Usagi as "a klutz, a ditz, and a crybaby;" however, there are many instances where Usagi and Chibiusa show their love and concern for one another, such as when Sailor Moon breaks down crying after Mistress 9 takes Chibiusa's pure heart crystal, or when she dives off a balcony to save her. Nevertheless, the two often bicker, often behaving more like sisters than mother and daughter; however, in the manga, although both bicker towards one another, Chibiusa is shown to have an admiration for Usagi. At times, a mother and daughter relationship is established between the two, shown in various everyday actions such as Usagi holding Chibiusa's hand to cross the street, etc. In Sailor Moon Crystal, Usagi talks to Chibiusa as in a mix of motherly and sister fashion; the two eventually regards each other as best friends.

Before Usagi's discovery of Chibiusa's real identity, Chibiusa was kept under surveillance by Usagi—believing that Chibiusa may possibly be an enemy agent. Throughout the progression of the Black Moon Arc, Usagi slowly reaches an understanding of Chibiusa's motives and reasons for her actions—until her feelings towards Chibiusa is replaced from anguish and jealousy, to love and sympathy. A contrast in the beginning and end of Sailor Moon Crystal's Black Moon Arc is shown, in which Usagi expresses her rage upon Chibiusa's arrival, whilst in the latter as the season ends, Usagi is shown to be tearfully enjoying Chibiusa's return.

=== Personality ===
Chibiusa started out socially awkward; she quickly became popular with her classmates. In the manga, she once became president of her class. Her initial shyness could be attributed to the fact that she was teased in the 30th century for not having any Sailor Guardian powers. As the manga progresses, she gradually matures, becoming more comfortable with herself and more confident with her Sailor Guardian abilities. Because her dream in the manga is to become a beautiful lady, her actions and ideals are often are based around this goal. She tries to be a perfectionist and starts off trying to do everything alone and for herself. This view evolves as she realizes what maturity really is and what it really means to be an adult. In the original anime, she is more judgmental and does not mature as much as her manga counterpart. But she does in Sailor Moon Crystal and gets along better with Usagi.

Chibiusa's dream is to one day become a real lady, to have her own prince, and to be friends with everyone she knows. Meanwhile, she is a fairly ordinary little girl; she likes the colors pink and red, pudding, pancakes, and rabbits. Her favorite school subject is drawing, while her least favorites are language classes. Her least favorite food is listed in the manga as carrots, just like Usagi, but they both eat them in the anime. Chibiusa hates homemaking and "taking care of the house" and is afraid of such things as thunder and lightning, ghosts, vampires, dentists, and needles. She also likes to collect things with rabbits on them, and belongs to the Gardening Committee at school. She is very short when she first appears, but grows slightly taller as she gets older.

== Aspects and forms ==
As a character with different incarnations, special powers, transformations and a long lifetime virtually spanned between the 20th and the 30th centuries, Chibiusa gains multiple aspects and aliases as the series progresses.

=== Sailor Chibi Moon ===
Sailor Chibi Moon is Chibiusa's identity as a Sailor Guardian. Her uniforms resemble Sailor Moon's, colored primarily in cherry blossom pink and red, with a prominent motif of small hearts, joined later by crescent moons and stars. Due to her small stature, certain details of her uniforms are slightly abbreviated and her body becomes a bit older, and taller. She is given various titles throughout the series, including Princess Guardian, Apprentice Guardian, and Guardian in Training. As the daughter of Sailor Moon and Tuxedo Mask, she exhibits traits of both parents in battle. Her personality is no different from when she is a civilian, although certain powers are unavailable to her in that form.

In the manga Sailor Chibi Moon's powers are significant, able to destroy and kill enemies. She attacks in tandem with Sailor Moon, often combining attacks with her, and combining one with Tuxedo Mask. Late in the series, it is heavily implied that she will marry her own prince in the future, Helios. She also develops and matures as a Sailor Guardian throughout the manga, assisted by her own guardians, the Sailor Quartet, and eventually saving Sailor Moon's life.

In the anime she is made into more of a comic character that has little to no effect on her enemies. She uses mainly distraction techniques and plays a side role, instead of a role that is directly useful to the Sailor Guardians. While her powers are specifically based on Sailor Moon's in words, they are more like that of her father's distractions rather than effective attacks. She links her powers with her parents' in the movies, but not in the TV series. It is clear, though, that she does have some true raw power, as seen in Episode 81, and in the final battle sequences where she uses the Silver Crystal. However, when she uses her powers as a regular character this rarely comes into play.

Her powers in the musicals are based on both her anime and manga incarnations. In Last Dracul she heads to the enemy hideout alone only to have her attacks fail; In the revised version of Transylvania no Mori she laments that a phrase from a game similar to Red light Green light is more useful than her most powerful attack when dealing with the Sammael Quartet. Conversely, in the same musicals she is able to combine her powers with Sailor Moon for multiple powerful attacks that damage/heal enemies. It is only in the fourth season of the anime that she gains a more relevant role as Pegasus gives her a new compact to become Super Sailor Chibi Moon for the first time, and she becomes the only one able to summon him to give assistance to Sailor Moon in performing the attacks that defeat the enemies' minions.

As she grows stronger, Sailor Chibi Moon gains additional power, and at key points her uniform changes to reflect this. The first change is first seen in act 33 of the manga, when the Holy Chalice of the future allows her to turn into Super Sailor Chibi Moon (or Super Sailor Mini Moon in the English anime). Later, Pegasus gives her a compact which lets her transform without the Grail. In episode 128 of the anime, this gift is what causes her to become Super Sailor Chibi Moon for the first time. A third form appears in Act 42 of the manga, unnamed but similar to Eternal Sailor Moon (without wings). In the official visual book for Sailor Moon Eternal, this form was named "Eternal Sailor Chibi Moon".

=== Princess Usagi Small Lady Serenity ===
Princess Usagi Small Lady Serenity (プリンセス・うさぎS(スモール)L(レディ)セレニティ, Purinsesu Usagi Sumōru Redi Sereniti), is the official name and title that is often shortened by her parents and family friends to Small Lady (スモール・レディ, Sumōru Redi) to better differentiate her from her mother; this is the name that Chibiusa is known by in her 30th century timeline.

In the manga, this form appears more frequently and receives more explanation. It is the name given to her by her parents so she often uses this to identify herself in the future. The only other character to use it, besides the royal family and its friends and allies, is Diana, who periodically calls her by Small Lady and uses honorific endings "-denka" to indicate that Chibiusa is a non-sovereign crown princess. Her princess form also appears in Artbooks IV and the Materials Collection, in which she is drawn among the other Sailor Soldiers in their specific gowns. She wears a light pink gown unique from all the others.

In the anime, Chibiusa changes into her princess form when she needs more power than her Guardian or civilian forms allow, similar to how her parents can become Prince Endymion and Princess Serenity when they need more power. In this form, she wears a dress and jewelry identical to that of Princess Serenity, albeit smaller. This happens twice, during the final battles of the second and fourth series. Like her mother, Chibiusa grows a pair of functioning, angelic wings during the SuperS climax. She does this after Usagi, as Serenity, grabs her while they are falling, and the two of them collide with Pegasus. It is unknown if she grew the wings on her own or with Usagi's or Pegasus' help. The Chibiusa of the future, Small Lady, is also shown in her princess dress when she is not transformed, so this form is not exclusive to power-ups.

In the anime, it is not told where she got the name from, but again it is only used by the royal family and friends. She mainly goes by Chibiusa, even to the point where in the 20th century she asks Setsuna to call her Chibiusa instead of Small Lady.

In act 40 of the manga, it is stated that when she is old enough she will become Princess Lady Serenity. This form is shown in Artbooks IV and V and in Helios' dreams. In the end, when the enemy is defeated and Helios has departed on the back of the "real" Pegasus, Chibiusa thinks to herself that when she has grown up, he will become her "prince." This older future form is never shown or mentioned in the anime, though an older Chibiusa is shown in episode 158 when she and Usagi switch ages.

=== Black Lady ===
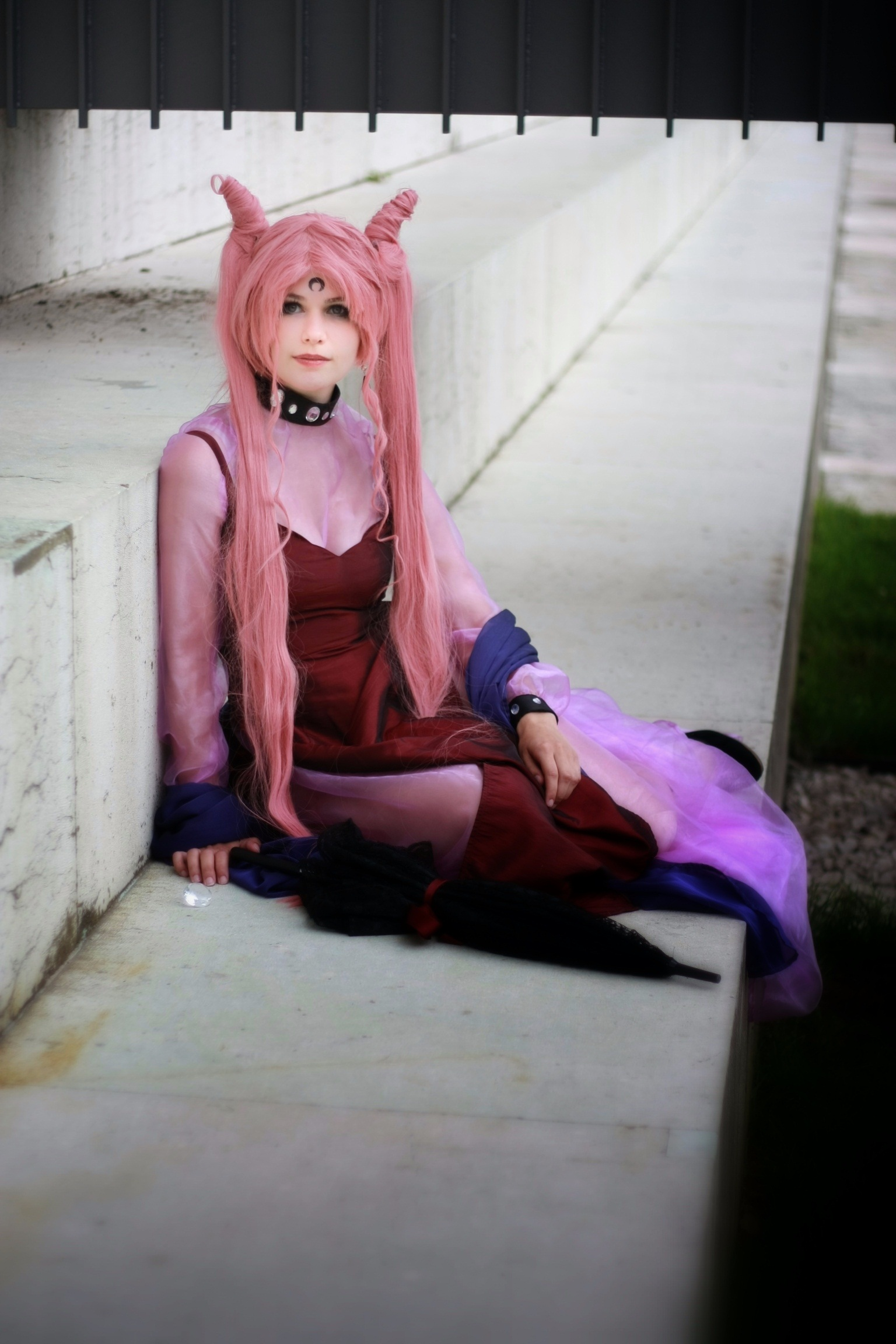
A cosplayer as Black Lady, Chibiusa's corrupted dark self.

During the Black Moon Clan arc, Chibiusa was lost in a space-time storm and then found by Wiseman who then preyed on her frustration and despondencies, deceiving her in entering a faustian deal which turned her into his agent Black Lady (ブラック・レディ, Burakku Redi), known as Wicked Lady in the DiC dub. Infused with the energies of the Malefic Black Crystal, causing the Black Moon insignia to appear on her forehead, Black Lady resembles Chibiusa as an adult in an organdy and satin dress, Black Crystal earrings, and hair longer than Usagi's.

Obsessively in love with Mamoru, Black Lady abducted Tuxedo Mask when he entered the space-time storm after Wiseman turned her into his servant. In the anime reboot Sailor Moon Crystal, Black Lady was also present as a shadowy silhouette to insult Rubeus as Wiseman kills him. She later reveals herself to Prince Demande and Saphir after the Malefic Black Crystal Reactor had a meltdown, taking the two to Wiseman. Black Lady later confronts the Sailor Guardians directly to take their Silver Crystal, discarding her birthright while summoning additional chucks of the Malefic Black Crystal to speed up 30th Century Earth's destruction. But when Sailor Pluto sacrificed herself to prevent Demande from accidentally destroying the universe with the two Silver Crystals, Black Lady emotionally broke down upon remembering her friendship with Pluto. Black Lady's anguished crying awakened the future Silver Crystal's power, shattering Wiseman's spell over her as she reverts to her original form and reawakens as Sailor Chibi Moon.

In the original anime, Black Lady weaponizes Luna-P rather than discarding the toy when it recognized her. Her memories were greatly distorted to have her assume that she was unloved by both her parents, which motivated her to kill them and the Sailor Guardians, but Black Lady was purified back to Chibiusa when Sailor Moon assumed the appearance of Neo-Queen Serenity and embraced her.

Black Lady also appears in the Sailor Moon musicals Tanjou! Ankoku no Princess Black Lady and its revision Tanjou! Ankoku no Princess Black Lady [Kaiteiban] -Wakusei Nemesis no Nazo-.

Black Lady appears as a boss in the Sailor Moon: Another Story video game even though Chibiusa is present.

== Special powers and items ==
=== Luna-P ===
From Chibiusa's first appearance, her primary tool is a cat-faced rubber ball called Luna-P. (Note: Called "Lunaball", "Luna Sphere", or "Luna-Bot" in the DiC dub) It strongly resembles Luna, and Chibiusa regards it as her closest friend. It acts as her guardian, can be used as a communication device, particularly with Sailor Pluto, and can be transformed into other objects Chibiusa may need by use of a special phrase, such as Abracadabra Pon in the manga and Crystal and Luna-P Change in the anime. (Note: In the DiC dub, this technique is named Luna-Bot Transform or Luna Sphere! Kitty Magic.) While the manga and Crystal depicted her knocking Luna-P away, Black Lady overwrites the toy's programming with the Black Crystal's power to use as a weapon in the original anime.

=== Key of Space-Time ===
Chibiusa travels through time at various points in the series using the Key of Space-Time she stole from Sailor Pluto. (Note: In the anime, it was given to her.) She time-travels by holding up the key and shouting, "Time Guardian! Tear apart the sky, and open the space-time door to me! I call the true name of the almighty god of time, the time guardian's father! Chronos! Reveal to me the path of light!" (Note: 時の衛人よ！時空の扉、天空を裂き、我に開け放て！我は汝の真の名を呼ぶ全能なる時の神、衛人の父、クロノスよ！我を導きたまえ！我を守りたまえ！光の道を我に！, Toki no moribito yo! Jikū no tobira, tenkū o saki, Ware ni akehanate! Ware wa nanji no shin no na o yobu zen'nō naru toki no kami, moribito no chichi, kuronosu yo! Ware wo michibiki tamae! Ware mamori tamae! Hikari no michi oware ni!)

=== Pink Moon Stick ===
Sailor Chibi Moon using the Pink Moon Stick to perform Pink Sugar Heart Attack in Sailor Moon Crystal

Chibiusa is not shown using unassisted powers until she transforms into a Sailor Guardian by activating a special device and shouting a certain phrase. Originally this is "Moon Prism Power, Make-up!" (Note: In the Cloverway adaptation, Chibiusa does not say 'Make up' when transforming, although it is sometimes replaced with "Transform!" In some cases she says "Mini Prism Power".) In the manga, her becoming a Sailor Guardian at the end of the second story arc is shown, whereas in the anime it happens off-screen and is not revealed until partway into the third arc. She does not initially have a full anime transformation sequence.

In the manga, Sailor Chibi Moon's first act as a Sailor Guardian is to use the Moon Rod of the future (analogous to Sailor Moon's rod of the present) to perform a double Moon Princess Halation with Sailor Moon, destroying Death Phantom. During the third story arc, she uses her own Moon Rod (called the Pink Moon Stick in the anime) in conjunction with her first solo power, Pink Sugar Heart Attack. This is a reasonably effective attack in the manga, but is nearly useless in the anime and is mainly used for comedic effect. It often lacks the sufficient range to hit a monster or fails to initiate at all. The damage it deals can be strong enough to shatter glass.

=== Holy Grail ===
At the end of the manga's third arc, she assists Super Sailor Moon by briefly upgrading to Super form herself using the Holy Grail of the future. Neither is able to maintain this form under her own strength until the fourth story arc, when they are empowered by Pegasus to take on Super forms whenever they need to via "Moon Crisis, Make-up!" (Note: In the Cloverway dub, this technique is called Moon Cosmic Dream Action. In Sailor Moon SuperS: The Movie, it is called Super Moon Crisis Power.) In the anime, this is the first time Chibiusa takes on her Super form, and throughout the fourth series she and Sailor Moon share a single transformation sequence.

=== Pegasus artifacts ===
In the anime, Sailor Chibi Moon is strengthened significantly in the fourth story arc by Pegasus, who takes refuge in the Golden Mirror of her dreams. He grants her a new transformation that she shares with Usagi as well as two special items with which to contact him: the Stallion Reve, for simple communication, and the Crystal Carillon, to summon him in battle. Using the latter, fashioned from her old Pink Moon Stick and retaining all its powers, she summons Pegasus with Twinkle Yell. (Note: In the Cloverway dub, the incantation is instead Twinkle Bell or Crystal Twinkle Bell.) This allows Sailor Moon to power up and make her final blow. Furthermore, in the penultimate episode of SuperS, Sailor Chibi Moon is given the Golden Crystal, which she uses to call on the power of dreams.

=== Other attacks ===
In the manga, Chibiusa is briefly entrusted with the Deep Aqua Mirror, Sailor Neptune's Talisman, and can use it to teleport to Neptune's location.

Together with Tuxedo Mask, she performs Pink Sugar Tuxedo Attack, and continues to occasionally join Sailor Moon in one-off power-ups of the latter's attacks, including Rainbow Double Moon Heartache and Starlight Honeymoon Double Therapy Kiss. Only one of these is used in the anime: Moon Gorgeous Meditation, which is only ever shown as a joint power, using the Kaleido Moon Scopes, which are given to them by Mamoru in the manga and Pegasus in the anime. By holding hands with her fellow Guardians in a circle, she can perform Sailor Teleport with them.

She also uses several comedic one-offs, including fending off a vampire with Garlic Attack jump-kicking with Sailor Moon, and amplifying the sound of her crying to a deafening level with her hair-pieces.

=== Pink Moon Crystal ===
At the end of the fourth arc, in the manga only, the Silver Crystal of the future evolves into Chibiusa's own Pink Moon Crystal, and she gains the ability to transform into her third, most powerful Sailor Guardian form: Eternal Sailor Chibi Moon. When she returns from the future in the final story arc with her guardians, the Sailor Quartet, they perform the attack Pink Ladies Freezing Kiss.

== Portrayals ==
In the original Japanese anime series, Chibiusa is voiced by Kae Araki. Misato Fukuen provides her voice in Sailor Moon Crystal.

In the DIC/Cloverway edited English-language adaptation, the voice of "Rini" is provided first by Tracey Hoyt (in the R series and movies) and then by Stephanie Beard (in the S and SuperS series); Elizabeth Saunders provided the voice of "Wicked Lady". In Viz Media's English re-dub by Studiopolis, Chibiusa's voice is provided by Sandy Fox in both her normal and "Black Lady" forms.

In the stage musicals, Chibiusa was frequently double-cast, and has been played by 18 actresses: Ai Miyakawa, Mao Kawasaki, Natsumi Takenaka, Tamaki Dia Shirai, Ayano Gunji, Arisu Izawa, Kasumi Takabatake, Noël Miyazaki, Aisha Yamamoto, Nanami Ōta, Mao Ōno, Mina Horita, Moe Ōsaki, Kokoro Kuge, Airi Kanda, Erena Kamata, Yurika Kobayashi, and Chise Niitsu. In 2001, Mao Kawasaki went on to portray her evil adult form, Black Lady. This form was also portrayed by Shion Nakamaru and Yui Itō. Ayano Gunji, the longest running Chibiusa actress, stated that the manga and anime of Sailor Moon was #1, and she was happy to watch the show. She also stated she became even happier when she was able to wear Chibi Moon's costume, and wanted to live actively like Chibiusa.

Chibiusa does not appear in the live-action series.

== Reception and influence ==
The Japanese official Sailor Moon character popularity poll listed Chibiusa, Sailor Chibi Moon, Princess Lady Serenity, and Black Lady as separate entities. In 1993, with fifty choices, Chibiusa was the most popular character, Black Lady was the thirteenth most popular, and Luna-P, an item of Chibiusa's, was the seventeenth most popular character. In 1994, with fifty one choices, Sailor Chibi Moon was the second most popular character, Chibiusa was the eighth most popular, and Luna-P was the twenty sixth most popular character. In early 1996, with fifty one choices, Sailor Chibi Moon was again the second most popular character, Chibiusa was the eleventh most popular, and Princess Lady Serenity, an older form of Small Lady, was the twenty fourth most popular character.

Despite this, Chibiusa has been described by Jonathan Clements and Helen McCarthy as "unpopular" even among Japanese audiences, at least in the anime.

== See also ==
- Moon in art and literature
