= Negaverse =

Negaverse may refer to:

- The home of the evil NegaDuck in the Darkwing Duck series
- The Dark Kingdom and its members, the Hell Tree aliens and the Black Moon Clan in the DiC English dub of Sailor Moon.
