= List of Sailor Moon chapters =

The cover of the first volume of Pretty Soldier Sailor Moon as published by Kodansha on July 6, 1992, in Japan.

Sailor Moon is a Japanese manga series written and illustrated by Naoko Takeuchi. Set in Tokyo in the 1990s, the series follows the adventures of Usagi Tsukino, a girl who transforms into the titular protagonist and goes on a journey to save the universe from being annihilated. Along the way, she encounters and defeats a diverse group of enemies. The series was published in individual chapters in the monthly manga anthology Nakayoshi, Several adaptations based on Sailor Moon have been made including two anime series and three feature films produced by Toei Animation, as well as a musical series, a live-action television series produced by Toei Company, and a large number of video games.

These chapters were collected by Kodansha in a series of 18 tankōbon volumes; the first released on July 6, 1992, while the last one was released on April 4, 1997. The manga was later rereleased in 12 shinsōban in 2003 under the title Pretty Guardian Sailor Moon to coincide with the release of the live-action series of the same name, with some corrections and updates to the dialogue and artwork. Volume 1 was released on September 22, 2003 and volume 12 released on July 23, 2004.

== Volumes ==
No.	Original release date	Original ISBN	English release date	English ISBN
1	July 6, 1992	978-4-06-178721-6	December 1, 1998	978-1-892213-01-3
Start of the arc "Dark Kingdom" (「ダーク・キングダム」, "Dāku Kingudamu"). (volumes 1-4/chapters 1-14): Act 1: "Usagi – Sailor Moon" (うさぎ—SAILOR MOON, "Usagi SAILOR MOON"); Act 2: "Ami – Sailor Mercury" (亜美—SAILOR MERCURY, "Ami SAILOR MERCURY"); Act 3: "Rei – Sailor Mars" (レイ—SAILOR MARS, "Rei SAILOR MARS"); Act 4: "Masquerade Dance Party" (Masquerade—仮面舞踏会, "Masquerade Kamen Butōkai"); Act 5: "Makoto – Sailor Jupiter" (まこと—SAILOR JUPITER, "Makoto SAILOR JUPITER")
A lazy 14-year-old girl named Usagi Tsukino saves a cat with a crescent-shaped mark on its forehead while running late to Juban Public Middle School, later encountering the cat as it talks to her. The cat introduces herself as Luna and gives Usagi a brooch to transform into a Sailor Guardian to fight a mysterious evil plaguing Tokyo while finding the other Sailor Guardians so they can find and protect the Legendary Silver Crystal. Calling herself "Sailor Moon", Usagi survived her first encounter with a monster thanks to a masked tuxedo-wearing stranger who introduces himself as Tuxedo Mask who is also seeking the Silver Crystal. In time, having chance encounters with a high school student named Mamoru Chiba, Usagi is joined by fellow Sailor Guardians Ami Mizuno, Rei Hino, and Makoto Kino as they defeat Jadeite and Nephrite of the Four Kings of Heaven who serve the Dark Kingdom and its leader Queen Beryl.
2	October 6, 1992	978-4-06-178731-5	December 24, 1998	978-1-892213-05-1
Act 6: "Tuxedo Mask..." (タキシード仮面—TUXEDO MASK, "Takishīdo Kamen TUXEDO MASK"); Act 7: "Mamoru Chiba – Tuxedo Mask" (地場衛—TUXEDO MASK, "Chiba Mamoru TUXEDO MASK"); Act 8: "Minako – Sailor V" (美奈子—SAILOR V, "Minako SAILOR V"); Act 9: "Serenity – Princess" (セレニティ—PRINCESS, "Sereniti PRINCESS")
Tuxedo Mask's determination to find the Legendary Silver Crystal has him publicly reveal its existence for intel, which is exploited by the Four Kings' member Zoisite and results in Usagi and Mamoru learning of each other's identities as Sailor Moon and Tuxedo Mask. When Zoisite targets Sailor Moon, he is killed by Sailor V, her partner Artemis introducing her as both Minako Aino and the reincarnated Moon Princess Serenity. After communing with her overlord Queen Metaria, Beryl sends the last of Four Kings Kunzite after Minako. Despite Minako's attempts to prevent Usagi from getting involved, she and other Sailor Guardians join Minako as Tuxedo Mask sacrifices himself to protect Usagi from Kunzite's attack. It results in the dying Mamoru and Usagi awakening to their past lives as the ancient Earth Prince Endymion and the real Princess Serenity whose love resulted in their deaths during a war that occur between their kingdoms. Usagi's tears bring forth the Silver Crystal with its power entering Mamoru's body before he is spirited away by Kunzite. Minako resumes her role as Sailor Venus while revealing herself, Ami, Rei, and Mako to be Usagi's handmaidens and bodyguards reborn.
3	April 6, 1993	978-4-06-178744-5	May 21, 1999	978-1-892213-06-8
Act 10: "Moon" (MOON—月, "MOON Tsuki"); Act 11: "Reunion – Endymion" (再開—ENDYMION, "Saikai ENDYMION"); Act 12: "Enemy – Queen Metaria" (敵—QUEEN METARIA, "Teki QUEEN METARIA"); Act 13: "Final Battle – Reincarnation" (決戦—REINCARNATION, "Kessen REINCARNATION")
The Sailor Guardians teleport to the ruins of Silver Millennium on the Moon for answers and are greeted by the sentient hologram of Queen Serenity: Usagi's mother from her past life. They learn their former home's destruction was caused by the evil entity and overlord Queen Metaria warping the minds of the Earth populace save Endymion who died protecting Serenity. The queen assures Usagi that Mamoru is still alive as she had willed the Legendary Silver Crystal to save him and asks her to consider its true power. Meanwhile, following the revelation that he and the other Four Kings were once Endymion's protectors in their past lives, Kunzite ends up back under Beryl's control and he is sent to his death in an attempt to take Silver Crystal. But Beryl uses Metaria's power to revive Mamoru as a thrall to infiltrate the Sailor Guardians' command center and steal the Silver Crystal. Beryl reveals herself to be the reincarnation of a woman who loved Endymion and killed him in a jealous rage to Serenity after willingly swearing loyalty to Metaria. Though Beryl is killed by the Sailor Guardians using the sacred stone sword they brought with them from the moon, Mamoru steals the weapon and falls back to the Dark Kingdom's base with D-Point in the Arctic with Usagi following. When Usagi realizes she cannot heal Mamoru while learning that a fragment of the Silver Crystal is still inside his body, she is forced to commit murder-suicide to restore the Silver Crystal as the Guardians arrive. The restored Silver Crystal envelops Mamoru and Usagi as Metaria consumes them and overwhelms the Guardians while spreading her evil across the planet as Luna and Artemis travel back to the moon to pray for Queen Serenity's help. Despite the seemingly hopeless situation as the Guardians sacrifice themselves to revive her, Usagi and Mamoru are revealed to be alive as the latter learns from the spirits of the Four Kings that Metaria's forehead is a weak point. He relays this to Usagi after their escape from Metaria's body, with Sailor Moon intending to finish their enemy for good.
4	July 6, 1993	978-4-06-178753-7	September 14, 1999	978-1-892213-15-0
Start of the arc "Black Moon" (「ブラック・ムーン」, "Burakku Mūn"). (volumes 4-7/chapters 15-26): Act 14: "Conclusion and Commencement – Petite Étrangère" (終結 そして 始まり—Petite étrangère, "Shūketsu Soshite Hajimari Petite Étrangère"); Act 15: "Infiltration – Sailor Mars" (浸入—SAILOR MARS, "Shin'nyū SAILOR MARS"); Act 16: "Abduction – Sailor Mercury" (誘拐—SAILOR MERCURY, "Yūkai SAILOR MERCURY"); Act 17: "Secrecy – Sailor Jupiter" (秘密—SAILOR JUPITER, "Himitsu SAILOR JUPITER")
With the help of Tuxedo Mask, her friends' spirits, and the restored Crystal Tower, Sailor Moon destroys Metaria at the cost of her transformation brooch while Silver Millennium is restored to its former glory. Rather than becoming the new queen, realizing why she was reborn on Earth, Usagi states that she wants to live her life out there with her friends. Queen Serenity accepts her daughter's wish and gives her a new transformation brooch so she can become Sailor Moon once again and use Moon Healing Escalation to restore the planet and other Guardians to life. But as it seems things are returning to normal, her new brooch allowing her to conceal the Legendary Silver Crystal, Usagi's date with Mamoru's private time is suddenly interrupted when a pink-haired girl suddenly falls out from a portal in the sky. Introducing herself as Usagi, called Chibiusa and wanting Usagi's Silver Crystal despite appearing to have her own, the girl's presence brings in a new enemy in the Specter Sisters of the Black Moon Clan with their commander Crimson Rubeus abducting Rei, Ami, and Makoto.
5	November 6, 1993	978-4-06-178764-3	September 28, 1999	978-1-892213-20-4
Act 18: "Invasion – Sailor Venus" (侵略—SAILOR VENUS, "Shinryaku SAILOR VENUS"); Act 19: "Time Warp – Sailor Pluto" (タイムワープ—SAILOR PLUTO, "Taimu Wāpū SAILOR PLUTO"); Act 20: "Crystal Tokyo – King Endymion" (クリスタルトーキョー—KING ENDYMION, "Kurisutaru Tōkyō KING ENDYMION"); "Chibiusa's Picture Diary (Extra Compilation)" (ちびうさ絵日記(番外編), "Chibiusa Enikki (Bangaihen)")
As the Guardians analyze one of the crystal earrings left behind by one of the Specter Sisters, attempting to talk Chibiusa into revealing what she knows of the Black Moon, they find themselves in a two-pronged attack by Rubeus and the remaining Specter Sister Calaveras. Chibiusa confesses to coming from 30th century Earth to seek Usagi's help in saving her time, meeting the Guardian of Time and Chibiusa's friend Sailor Pluto that arrived at the ruins of the future city of Crystal Tokyo in ruins. Meeting with an astral projection of Mamoru's future self King Endymion, Sailor Moon learns that she will become Neo-Queen Serenity in the future with Chibiusa as her future daughter with Endymion. Endymion explains the Black Moon are extremists who acquired the time distorting Malefic Black Crystal on planet Nemesis which they used to lay waste on Crystal Tower with Neo-Queen Serenity ending up in a comatose state, adding that Usagi is unable to use her Silver Crystal in the future period. Following Endymion helping his past self destroy the Black Moon member Esmeraude, Usagi is abducted by the Black Moon's leader Prince Demand.
6	March 5, 1994	978-4-06-178772-8	February 8, 2000	978-1-892213-35-8
Act 21: "Complication – Nemesis" (錯綜—NEMESIS, "Sakusō NEMESIS"); Act 22: "Hidden Agenda – Nemesis" (思惑—NEMESIS, "Omowaku NEMESIS"); Act 23: "Covert Maneuvers – Wiseman" (暗躍—WISEMAN, "An'yaku WISEMAN"); Act 24: "Attack – Black Lady" (攻撃—BLACK LADY, "Kōgeki BLACK LADY")
Usagi awakens on Nemesis and learns from Prince Demand that the Black Moon Clan considers the Legendary Silver Crystal's life extending effect on humanity as unforgivable and intended to eliminate the past selves of Neo-Queen Serenity and her court. Meanwhile, Endymion revealing that Chibiusa has not aged for 900 years because she has yet to awaken as a Sailor Guardian, Chibiusa runs off into a time storm after seeing Pluto acting differently around her father made her feel lonely and confused. This resulted in Mamoru attempting to follow after Chibiusa as she was found by the Black Moon's benefactor Wiseman. Meanwhile, with Neo-Queen Serenity giving her power to become Sailor Moon, Usagi frees her friends as they escape when the reactor leading Nemesis' core undergoes a planetary meltdown. Rubeus is later killed by Wiseman during the chaos, Demand and his younger brother Saphir are saved by Wiseman's new right hand Black Lady: a transformed Chibiusa. With Saphir and Tuxedo Mask under her control, Black Lady confronts the Sailor Guardians while Demande feigned being under Wiseman's control to make attempt on his life after reluctantly killing Saphir. But Wiseman reveals the exposed husk to be his former body before revealing himself as Nemesis while descending. As Luna's and Artemis' future daughter Diana convinces Pluto to help the Guardians, a maddened Demand steals both Silver Crystals and attempts to touch them to destroy the entire universe.
7	July 7, 1994	978-4-06-178781-0	June 6, 2000	978-1-892213-42-6
Start of the arc "Infinity" (「無限」, "Mugen"). (volumes 7-10/chapters 27-38): Act 25: "Showdown – Death Phantom" (対決—DEATH PHANTOM, "Taiketsu DEATH PHANTOM"); Act 26: "Replay – Never Ending" (再生—NEVER ENDING, "Saisei NEVER ENDING"); Act 27: "Infinity 1 – Premonition" (無限1 予感, "Mugen 1 Yokan")
Sailor Pluto stops time to prevent Prince Demand from having the past and present Legendary Silver Crystals touch each other, a taboo act resulting in her death as a consequence. Seeing Pluto die breaks Wiseman's hold over Chibiusa as she reverts to her original self while awakening as Sailor Chibi Moon, causing Neo-Queen Serenity to awaken from her slumber. With Prince Demand killed, Wiseman reveals himself as the terrorist Death Phantom whom Neo-Queen Serenity exiled to Nemesis which became a vessel for his hateful soul after he died. After Usagi and Mamoru are transported to Death Phantom's actual location, they are joined by Chibiusa as they destroy Death Phantom together while Crystal Tokyo is restored to its former glory. Neo-Queen Serenity gives the Sailor Guardians new devices and the Spiral Heart Moon Rod as they and Usagi return to their time, with Chibiusa later arriving to be trained by them. But the group soon finds themselves plagued by a disturbing vision about three shadowed Sailor Guardians, accompanied by a voice that calls for the girl's awakening and "the beginning of doom." While investigating the prestigious Mugen Academy due to its students suddenly turning into "Reversionized" monsters, the Guardians encounter two of the school's elite students: talented violinist Michiru Kaioh and famed auto racer Haruka Tenno. The event results with the Guardians encountering a monstrous entity known as a Daimon, meeting a mysterious girl who witnessed their transformation while healing Chibiusa's wound, and two unidentified Sailor Guardians who observed the fight.
8	November 2, 1994	978-4-06-178790-2	December 5, 2000	978-1-892213-47-1
Act 28: "Infinity 2 – Ripples" (無限2 波紋, "Mugen 2 Hamon"); Act 29: "Infinity 3 – Two New Soldiers" (無限3 2人—NEW SOLDIERS, "Mugen 3 Futari NEW SOLDIERS"); Act 30: "Infinity 4 – Sailor Uranus – Haruka Tenou, Sailor Neptune – Michiru Kaiou" (無限4 セーラーウラヌス—天王はるか セーラーネプチューン—海王みちる, "Mugen 4 Sērā Uranusu Ten'ō Haruka Sērā Nepuchūn Kaiō Michiru"); Act 31: "Infinity 5 – Sailor Pluto – Setsuna Meiou" (無限5 セーラープルート—冥王せつな, "Mugen 5 Sērā Purūto Meiō Setsuna")
Kaolinite of the Death Busters instructs her servants, the Witches 5, to gather more souls to prolong the Taioron Crystal which their power derived while eliminating the Sailor Guardians. After defeating the witch Eudial, Sailor Moon encounters one of the mysterious Sailor Guardians who warns her to stay out of their way while kissing her. Chibiusa befriends Hotaru Tomoe, the girl that healed her wound, who happens to be the daughter of Mugen Academy's founder, Professor Tomoe. The two new Guardians destroy the second Witch, Mimete, and finally introduce themselves as Sailor Uranus and Sailor Neptune. The duo is revealed to be Haruka and Michiru as they save Ami from the third Witch Viluy. A university student named Setsuna Meioh investigates spatial disruptions near Infinity Academy, later awakening as the revived Sailor Pluto to save the Sailor Guardians from the fourth Witch Tellu.
9	February 6, 1995	978-4-06-178797-1	April 17, 2001	978-1-892213-68-6
Act 32: "Infinity 6 – Three Guardians" (無限6 3戦士, "Mugen 6 San Senshi"); Act 33: "Infinity 7 – Transformation – Super Sailor Moon" (無限7 変身—SUPER SAILOR MOON, "Mugen 7 Henshin SUPER SAILOR MOON"); Act 34: "Infinity 8 – Infinite Labyrinth 1" (無限8 「無限迷宮」1, "Mugen 8 Mugen Meikyū 1"); Act 35: "Infinity 9 – Infinite Labyrinth 2" (無限9 「無限迷宮」2, "Mugen 9 Mugen Meikyū 2")
Sailors Uranus, Neptune, and Pluto reunite and explain their mission as defenders of the Outer Solar System from external threats to Usagi and her friends, blaming themselves for Death Busters reaching Earth prior to their awakening and refusing the Sailor Guardians' offer to work together out of a sense of duty to dispatch both the Death Busters and their true enemy. The last of the Witches 5, Cyprine, uses her power to turn both Sailor groups against each other while she and her twin Ptilol split into two separate bodies when an unaffected Sailor Moon made an attack on them. Sailor Moon obtains the Holy Grail with the help of Tuxedo Mask and Sailor Chibi-Moon, which causes the Guardians to stop fighting and give their power to Sailor Moon. The Talismans carried by Uranus, Neptune, and Pluto react as the newly transformed Super Sailor Moon defeats Cyprine and Ptilol. The Outer Guardians reveal the truth to Sailor Moon: the last time that the Talismans reacted caused the awakening of the Guardian of Silence, Sailor Saturn, who wiped out the last remnants of Silver Millennium following its war with the Dark Kingdom. The trio states their intent to prevent Saturn from reawakening by sealing her soul after killing her reincarnation: Hotaru. Chibiusa tries to protect Hotaru, only to the latter to be possessed by a Daimon who fully takes over while stealing Chibiusa's soul and Silver Crystal. The entity reveals herself as Mistress 9, the partner of the Death Busters' supreme leader, Master Pharaoh 90. The Sailor Guardians try to save Chibiusa's soul and Hotaru while defeating Kaolinite and Tomoe. However, Mistress 9 has already taken the power of Chibiusa's Silver Crystal and begins to summon Pharaoh 90 so that he can consume the Earth and turn into a new haven for their kind, destroying Mugen Academy in the process.
10	June 6, 1995	978-4-06-178806-0	July 10, 2001	978-1-892213-98-3
Act 36: "Infinity 10 – Infinity – Upper Atmosphere" (無限10—無限大―上空, "Mugen 10 Mugendai Jōkū"); Act 37: "Infinity 11 – Infinity – Judgement" (無限11—無限大―審判, "Mugen 11 Mugendai Shinpai"); Act 38: "Infinity 12 – Infinity – Journey" (無限12—無限大―旅立ち, "Mugen 12 Mugendai Tabidachi"); "Chibiusa's Picture Diary #2" (ちびうさ絵日記, "Chibiusa Enikki")
Mistress 9 attempts to increase her powers by taking the souls of the Inner Guardians she captured, but Hotaru's soul resists while restoring the Guardians and Chibiusa prior to her body being destroyed by Mistress 9 emerging in her true form. Joining Tuxedo Mask, Chibiusa's wish to be as strong as Usagi causes the Holy Grail of the future to appear, allowing her to fight by Usagi's side as Super Sailor Guardians. Mistress 9 escapes being destroyed by the Sailor Guardians by allowing herself to be assimilated into Pharaoh 90 as a portal to their homeworld, the Tau Star System, appears in the sky. When Super Sailor Moon appeared to have sacrifice in an attempt to stop him, Sailor Saturn awakens and mortally wounds Pharaoh 90. She was able to bring about the annihilation of Earth to finish him off when Usagi liberates the power she amassed to deal a fatal blow on the already fatally damaged Pharaoh 90. As Pharaoh 90 attempts to escape back to Tau System, Saturn chases after him while urging Pluto to seal them both on the other side, which she regrettably does. As the Usagi restores the city, Hotaru returns to Earth as a reincarnated infant whom the Outer Guardians decide to raise as their adopted daughter as they take their leave before bidding farewell to the others and leaving to parts unknown.
11	July 6, 1995	978-4-06-178809-1	October 15, 2001	978-1-892213-99-0
"Princess Kaguya's Lover" (かぐや姫の恋人, "Kaguya hime no Koibito"); "Casablanca Memory" (カサブランカ·メモリー, "Kasaburanka Memorī")
12	September 6, 1995	978-4-06-178814-5	March 16, 1999	978-1-892213-12-9
Start of the arc "Dream" (「夢」, "Yume"). (volumes 12-16/chapters 39-49): Act 39: "Dream 1 – Eclipse Dream" (夢1—日食ドリーム, "Yume 1 Nisshoku Dorīmu"); Act 40: "Dream 2 – Mercury Dream" (夢2—マーキュリー·ドリーム, "Yume 2 Mākyurī Dorīmu"); Act 41: "Dream 3 – Mars Dream" (夢3—マーズ·ドリーム, "Yume 3 Māzu Dorīmu")
A year after the Mugen Academy incident, Usagi and her friends begin their new term as high school students while Mamoru enrolls into a university. Chibiusa's training as a Sailor Guardian is nearly complete as she prepares to return to her time, joining Usagi and Mamoru to watch a solar eclipse as their final activity together. But the three hear a bell while seeing a vision of a pegasus beseeching their help, Mamoru suddenly getting a stabbing feeling in his chest. At the same time, a mysterious group known as the Dead Moon Circus arrive and set up a barrier around the Juban district. Chibiusa is later visited in her dream by the pegasus as he introduced himself as Helios, presenting her with a bell while believing she is the maiden foretold to find the Golden Crystal despite her reservations. The next day, Zirconia and the Amazoness Quartet are alerted to the Sailor Guardians' presence when Chibiusa attempt to return to 30th century Japan was canceled by the barrier. After using a tiger to flush out Usagi and Chibiusa as they gain the ability to assume their Super Sailor forms without the use of the Holy Grail, the Amazoness PallaPalla swaps the girls' ages before she and the other quartet turn their tiger into Tiger's Eye alongside a hawk (Hawk's Eye) and a fish (Fish Eye) to go after the other Sailor Guardians. After Mamoru gets a medical checkup, Ami is tricked into buying Fish Eye from a pet store and is subjected to a nightmare before she defeats him upon gaining her Sailor Crystal from her Sailor Power Guardian, a small sprite resembling herself. Usagi and Chibiusa arrive and return to their original ages upon transforming. The Sailor Guardians decide to investigate the circus with Rei separated from the others and targeted by Tiger's Eye, only to be rescued by her pet crows Phobos and Deimos transform into their human forms and bestow her with her Sailor Crystal to transform and destroy Tiger's Eye.
13	December 6, 1995	978-4-06-178820-6	September 21, 1999	978-1-892213-24-2
Act 42: "Dream 4 – Jupiter Dream" (夢4—ジュピター·ドリーム, "Yume 4 Jupitā Dorīmu"); Act 43: "Dream 5 – Venus Dream" (夢5—ヴィーナス·ドリーム, "Yume 5 Vīnasu Dorīmu"); "Makoto's Melancholy" (まこちゃんのユーウツ, "Mako chan no Yūutsu"); "Ami's First Love" (亜美ちゃんの初恋, "Ami chan no Hatsukoi"); "Rei and Minako's Girls School Battle" (レイと美奈子の女子高バトル, "Rei to Minako no Joshikō Batoru")
Makoto is targeted by Hawk's Eye of the Dead Moon, but defeats him upon receiving her Sailor Crystal from her Sailor Power Guardian. Meanwhile, Mamoru's condition worsens as Helios assumes human form and reveals himself as an astral projection of the high priest of Elysion, a sacred land inside Earth that maintains the planet. Helios explains that Mamoru's life is linked to Elysion, which has been inflicted with a curse by his captor Queen Nehelenia. Usagi vows to find the Golden Crystal and break the curse while ending up cursed herself. At the same time, dismayed over being the only one unable to transform, Minako allows herself to find into a trap set up by the Amazoness Quartet and the twin knife-throwers Xenotime and Zeolite. Artemis comes to Minako's aid, assuming human form while giving her a Sailor Crystal to once again transform and defeat the knife throwers. But she and the other Super Sailor Guardians are ensnared by PallaPalla's vines while Zirconia uses the nightmare energy accumulated by their Lemures to cover the Earth in darkness.
14	March 6, 1996	978-4-06-178826-8	January 11, 2000	978-1-892213-26-6
Act 44: "Dream 6 – New Soldiers Dream" (夢6—ニュー·ソルジャー·ドリーム, "Yume 6 Nyu Sorujā Dorīmu"); Act 45: "Dream 7 – Mirror Dream" (夢7—ミラー・ドリーム, "Yume 7 Mirā Dorīmu"); Act 46: "Dream 8 – Elysion Dream" (夢8—エリュシオン·ドリーム, "Yume 8 Eryushion Dorīmu")
Haruka, Michiru, and Setsuna are shown living a happy life until the solar eclipse causes Hotaru to age rapidly while her memories are restored by the spirit of Sailor Saturn. Hotaru gives the Outer Guardians their Sailor Crystals to once more transform, coming to the other guardians' aid alongside Usagi, Chibiusa, and Mamoru. But Usagi and Mamoru are inflicted with a regressing curse by Zirconia with Helios spiriting them to Elysion, Chibiusa and Hotaru chasing after the Amazoness Quartet into the big top tent. During the fight, Hotaru reveals to the Quartet that they are being controlled by nightmare before they are sealed within orbs by Zirconia. Zirconia traps Chibi Moon and Saturn inside shards of glass before placing all six to the other side of Queen Nehelenia's mirror. In Elysion, Helios explains to Usagi and Mamoru that the Golden Kingdom originated in Elysion, which was Mamoru's birthplace in his past life as Endymion and that the Golden Crystal is Elysion's counterpart to Silver Millennium's Legendary Silver Crystal. Usagi deduce the Golden Crystal is inside Mamoru while her attempt to free Helios is detected by Nehelenia. Helios sends Usagi and Mamoru back to the surface, using the last of his power to send Elysion's purifying crystals to the surface to give them and the Super Sailor Guardians safe passage to the big top. Zirconia proceeds to attack them with her nightmare.
15	July 5, 1996	978-4-06-178835-0	August 15, 2000	978-1-892213-39-6
Act 47: "Dream 9 – Dead Moon Dream" (夢9—デッド・ムーン・ドリーム, "Yume 9 Deddo Mūn Dorīmu"); Act 48: "Dream 10 – Princess Dream" (夢10—プリンセス・ドリーム, "Yume 10 Purinsesu Dorīmu"); Act 49: "Dream 11 – Earth & Moon Dream" (夢11—アース アンド ムーン ドリーム, "Yume 11 Aasu ando Mūn Dorīmu"); "Chibiusa's Picture Diary #3" (ちびうさ絵日記, "Chibiusa Enikki")
While under Zirconia's nightmare, the Super Sailor Guardians believe Usagi and Mamoru have died, while Usagi thinks her friends were killed, but Mamoru manages to awaken everyone. The Super Sailor Guardians combine their powers to strike back against Zirconia, who flees into Nehelenia's mirror with Sailor Moon following her. There, Super Sailor Moon encounters Queen Nehelenia and frees Chibiusa and Hotaru as they escape with the orbs containing the Amazoness Quartet as their friends shatter the mirror. But the victory is short lived upon realizing Elysion is still in danger and return to Helios's temple to find Nehelenia's mirror. Nehelenia reflects the Sailor Guardians' attacks, the Inner Guardians recognizing Nelehenia as a self-titled queen of the moon who made her presence known during the celebration of Princess Serenity's birth. Refusing to leave peacefully while revealing her malicious intent, Nelehenia was sealed away within the mirror by Queen Serenity using the Silver Crystal. Nehelenia used her final moments of freedom to curse Silver Millennium to its downfall by the Dark Kingdom. Nehelenia takes the Legendary Silver Crystal from Usagi, only to lose it when Mamoru gives Usagi the power to break the curse over them with his Golden Crystal manifesting. Usagi then acquires the Holy Moon Chalice, summoning Luna, Artemis, and Diana in their human forms while the Super Sailor Guardians in their princess forms are beseeched by their Sailor Power Guardians to lend the power of their castles to Usagi so she can transform into Eternal Sailor Moon with the Silver Crystal transformed into the Sliver Moon Crystal. Usagi and her friends then destroy Nelehenia, her true form being Zirconia while the mirror dissolves. Revived by Chibiusa, Helios enables Usagi and Mamoru to assume their future forms as Neo Queen Serenity and King Endymion and seal the mirror's remains behind the eclipse, destroying him. Hotaru then has Usagi free the Amazoness Quartet, who are revealed to be Chibiusa's future Sailor Quartet Guardians who Nelehenia cursed into serving her. The Sailor Quartet take their leave to resume their rest until Chibiusa has fully awakened as a Sailor Guardian. Helios brings the group back to the surface while promising Chibiusa that they will meet again.
16	September 6, 1996	978-4-06-178841-1	March 13, 2001	978-1-892213-48-8
Start of the arc "Stars" (「スターズ」, "Sutāzu"). (volumes 16-18/chapters 50-60): Act 50: "Stars 1" (スターズ1, "Sutāzu 1"); Act 51: "Stars 2" (スターズ2, "Sutāzu 2"); Act 52: "Stars 3" (スターズ3, "Sutāzu 3")
Mamoru is about to leave to study in the United States but, as he is saying goodbye to Usagi, he is attacked and his body crumbles away, leaving only the Golden Crystal in its place, which is taken by Sailor Galaxia, the leader of a new group of villains known as Shadow Galactica. Usagi is shocked to see this and faints, but later blocks this memory and thinks Mamoru has arrived safely to the U.S. A new group of idols called the Three Lights comes to Tokyo and become students at Usagi's high school. Chibiusa returns to Crystal Tokyo, but days later, a little girl named ChibiChibi arrives to the Tsukino house and tricks Usagi's mother to believe she is Usagi's younger sister. Sailor Galaxia and her servants, the Sailor Animamates, destroy the eight Solar System Eternal Sailor Guardians as well as Phobos and Deimos, one by one, taking their Sailor Crystals. Two Animamates are killed by the Sailor Starlights, who are revealed to be the true identity of the Three Lights, while a third Animamate is defeated by Eternal Sailor Moon. Usagi remembers what happened to Mamoru with the help of the Starlights. In the future, Chibiusa overhears and conversation between Neo-Queen Serenity and Eternal Sailor Pluto about a disruptance in the past. A new student named Nyanko Suzu arrives to Usagi's high school and tries to befriend her, but Luna and Artemis sense in her a power similar to theirs. Princess Kakyuu, the leader of the Starlights, emerges from an incense burner that ChibiChibi has been taking care of.
17	December 6, 1996	978-4-06-178849-7	June 19, 2001	978-1-892213-70-9
Act 53: "Stars 4" (スターズ4, "Sutāzu 4"); Act 54: "Stars 5" (スターズ5, "Sutāzu 5"); Act 55: "Stars 6" (スターズ6, "Sutāzu 6"); "Chibiusa's Picture Diary #4" (ちびうさ絵日記, "Chibiusa Enikki")
As Kakyuu reunites with the Starlights, ChibiChibi is revealed to be a Sailor Guardian too. Suzu reveals she is an Animamate from the same planet as Luna and Artemis, and attacks them as well as Diana, who has just arrived from the future to help but fails to steal their Star Seeds and the Starlights force her to retreat. Galaxia eliminates her for her failure. Usagi meets Kakyuu, who explains that Galaxia has been destroying planets and stealing Sailor Crystals before reaching Earth, the Golden Crystal and the Silver Moon Crystal. Usagi, ChibiChibi, Kakyuu, and the Starlights travel to the Galaxy Cauldron, the birthplace of all life and stars in the Milky Way, located at the center of the galaxy, to get Mamoru's Golden Crystal and the Guardians' Sailor Crystals and revive them. Upon arriving, they meet Sailor Lethe, who brings Luna, Artemis, and Diana to kill them and to take their Star Seeds, which are as powerful as Sailor Crystals. Lethe attacks Usagi and the others but is stopped by her twin sister, Sailor Mnemosyne. Usagi realizes her Crystal is the source of all wars and asks Lethe and Mnemosyne to kill her, but the twins are moved by Usagi's sacrifice and let her go to Galaxia. However, Sailor Chi and Sailor Phi, Galaxia's closest servants and leaders of the Animamates, appear and kill Lethe and Mnemosyne with their powers, and take their Sailor Crystals. ChibiChibi shields herself, as well as Usagi and Kakyuu, but cannot protect the Starlights, who are still unconscious in the ground from Lethe's previous attack.
18	April 4, 1997	978-4-06-178858-9	September 18, 2001	978-1-892213-97-6
Act 56: "Stars 7" (スターズ7, "Sutāzu 7"); Act 57: "Stars 8" (スターズ8, "Sutāzu 8"); Act 58: "Stars 9" (スターズ9, "Sutāzu 9"); Act 59: "Stars 10" (スターズ10, "Sutāzu 10"); Act 60: "Stars 11" (スターズ11, "Sutāzu 11")
The Starlights die as a result of Sailor Phi and Sailor Chi's attack, and their Sailor Crystals are taken too. Chibiusa and the Sailor Quartet arrive from the future to help. As they make their way to Galactica Palace, Usagi and the others destroy one last Animamate, as well as Phi, Chi, and the eight Solar System Eternal Sailor Guardians, who are under Galaxia's control; however, Kakyuu is killed in action. Once inside the Palace, the battle between Usagi and Galaxia takes place. Usagi finally meets Chaos, the being who failed to become a star and who has sent incarnations in the forms of Metaria, Death Phantom, Pharaoh 90, and Nehelenia to reach Usagi and her Silver Crystal. Galaxia intends Usagi and Chaos to destroy each other so that she alone remains as the most powerful being in the Milky Way, but she is killed by Chaos. ChibiChibi states that the only way to defeat Chaos is to destroy the Cauldron, but Usagi tells her that she will not end the cycle of life of the galaxy and encourages ChibiChibi to never give up. ChibiChibi reveals her true self: Sailor Cosmos, Eternal Sailor Moon's ultimate form from a distant future. Usagi uses all her power and throws herself into the Cauldron to defeat and seal Chaos once and for all. Usagi's courage reminds Cosmos of the strength she needs to keep fighting and Cosmos returns to her own future. Within the Cauldron, Usagi meets Mamoru and her friends, and asks Guardian Cosmos, the guardian of the Cauldron, to send them all back to Earth and their normal lives as Chibiusa returns to Crystal Tokyo. The series concludes with Usagi and Mamoru's wedding, while the construction of Crystal Tokyo is taking place.

== Shinsōban short stories ==
No.	Original release date	Original ISBN	English release date	English ISBN
1	August 23, 2004	978-4-06-334910-8	September 10, 2013	978-1612624426
"Chibiusa's Picture Diary #1 – Beware of the Exchange Student!" (ちびうさ絵日記 – 転校生にご用心!, "Chibiusa Enikki – Tenkōsei ni Goyōjin!"); "Chibiusa's Picture Diary #2 – Beware of Tanabata!" (ちびうさ絵日記 – 七夕にご用心!, "Chibiusa Enikki – Tanabata ni Goyōjin!"); "Chibiusa's Picture Diary #3 – Beware of Cavities!" (ちびうさ絵日記 – 虫歯にご用心!, "Chibiusa Enikki – Mushiba ni Goyōjin!"); "Exam Battle #1 – The Melancholy of Mako!/Mako's Depression!" (受験戦争編 第1 まこちゃんのユーウツ!, "Juken Sensō Hen 1 – Mako-chan no Yūutsu!"); "Exam Battle #2 – Ami's First Love!" (受験戦争編 2 亜美ちゃんの初恋!, "Juken Sensō Hen 2 – Ami-chan no Hatsukoi!"); "Exam Battle #3 – Rei and Minako's Girls' School Battle!?" (受験戦争編 第3 レイと美奈子の女子校バトル!?, "Juken Sensō Hen 3 – Rei to Minako no Joshikō Batoru!?"); "Chibiusa's Picture Diary #4 – The Secret Hammer Price Hall" (ちびうさ絵日記 -ヒミツのハンマープライス堂, "Chibiusa Enikki – Himitsu no Hanmā Puraisu Dō")
2	September 22, 2004	978-4-06-334915-3	November 26, 2013	978-1612620107
"The Lover of Princess Kaguya" (かぐや姫の恋人, "Kaguya-hime no Koibito"); "Casablanca Memory" (カサブランカ·メモリー, "Kasaburanka Memorī"); "Parallel Sailormoon" (ぱられる せぇらぁむ〜ん, "Parareru Sērāmūn")

== English publication ==
The North America distributing company Tokyopop initially released 18 volumes from the Japanese first edition, split into five arcs; Dark Kingdom with fourteen acts, Black Moon with twelve acts, Infinity with twelve acts, Dream with eleven acts, and Stars with eleven acts. Volume 1 was released on December 1, 1998, and volume 18 was released on September 18, 2001. The first 10 acts were also published in the American magazine MixxZine, while acts 39 through 60 were published in Smile. The series was also published in thirty-five issues in traditional American comic book format. This publication was not complete, only containing acts 11 through 38 and the extra "Lover of Princess Kaguya". These were released starting in August 1998 at the San Diego ComicCon through mid-2001. The Mixx and Tokyopop editions of the manga went out of print in 2005.

In 2011, Kodansha USA began re-printing the 14-volume restored Sailor Moon manga edition (including the two short story compilations) under the title Pretty Guardian Sailor Moon, as well as the two-volume restored Codename: Sailor V manga editions in English beginning with Volume 1 of both titles on September 13, 2011, featuring a new translation. Subsequent volumes were published bimonthly.

In 2017, Kodansha USA announced plans to re-release Sailor Moon in an "Eternal Edition", featuring a new English translation, new cover artwork by Takeuchi, and color pages from the manga's original run, printed on extra-large premium paper. The first Eternal Edition volume was published on September 11, 2018; the tenth and final volume was published on October 20, 2020.

In 2020, Kodansha USA announced plans to re-release the Sailor Moon manga again as part of their "Naoko Takeuchi Collection". The company described the new edition as "an updated translation and high page count in a more affordable, portable" version. The first volume was published on April 5, 2022, and the last on September 17, 2024.
