= Manami Wakayama =

Japanese idol

Manami Wakayama (若山 愛美, Wakayama Manami; born December 9, 1986 in Tokyo, Japan) is a Japanese idol. She has had the role of Sailor Mercury and Berthier in the Sailor Moon Musicals or Seramyu. She held the role of Mercury from 2002 to 2005, graduating from the role with the musical Shin Kaguya Shima Densetsu - Kaiteiban. She has also released several idol DVDs and appeared in various other musicals.

== Musicals ==
- Tanjou! Ankoku no Princess Black Lady (Kaiteiban) - Wakusei Nemesis no Nazo - Berthier
- Mugen Gakuen - Mistress Labyrinth - Sailor Mercury
- Mugen Gakuen - Mistress Labyrinth (Kaiteiban) - Sailor Mercury
- Starlights - Ryuusei Densetsu - Sailor Mercury
- Kakyuu-Ouhi Kourin - The Second Stage Final - Sailor Mercury
- Shin Kaguya Shima Densetsu - Sailor Mercury
- Shin Kaguya Shima Densetsu (Kaiteiban) - Marinamoon Final - Sailor Mercury

Preceded by Chieko Kawabe	Ami Mizuno/Sailor Mercury in the Sailor Moon musicals 2002-2005	Succeeded by none
