= Black Moon Clan =

Fictional characters in Sailor Moon

- The Black Moon Clan. Down left side: Veneti, Aquatici, Chiral, Achiral. Center square, from top left: Blue Saphir, Prince Demand, Green Esmeraude, Crimson Rubeus. Right: Wiseman. Bottom line, from left: Kōan, Berthier, Calaveras, Petz.

Publication information
- Publisher: Kodansha
- First appearance: Sailor Moon chapter #14: Black Moon Kōan – Sailor Mars (March 3, 1993)
- Created by: Naoko Takeuchi

In-story information
- Base(s): Planet Nemesis
- Leader(s): Prince Demand; Wiseman
- Member(s): Crimson Rubeus; Green Esmeraude; Blue Saphir; Black Lady; Specter Sisters; Boule Brothers; Droids

The Black Moon Clan (Japanese: ブラックムーン一族, Hepburn: Burakku Mūn Ichizoku) is a group of fictional characters in the Sailor Moon manga series by Naoko Takeuchi. It comprises the main villains of the second major story arc, which is called the Black Moon in the manga and Sailor Moon Crystal, and which fills most of Sailor Moon R season of the original anime adaptation. They are first introduced in Act 15 "Infiltration – Sailor Mars", first published in Nakayoshi on March 3, 1993. In the DIC English adaptation, their name is changed to the "Negamoon Family".

Members of the Black Moon Clan are descendants of anarchists who opposed Crystal Tokyo, claiming that the governing group was corrupt and the resulting increase in human longevity by the Silver Crystal was a crime against nature. The founding leaders of the Black Moon were guided by Wiseman to the Planet Nemesis (宿敵, Shukuteki), a phantom planet that can conceal itself from anything save X-Rays and produce shards of the Malefic Black Crystal (邪黒水晶, Jakoku Suishō). All members of the Black Moon Clan have black, upside-down crescents on their foreheads (the inverse of the marking of Silver Millennium). They wear earrings which, according to the Materials Collection, are made of Black Crystal and allow them to teleport.

== Creation and conception ==
Series creator Naoko Takeuchi originally intended Sailor Moon to last one season, but due to its popularity, Toei Animation asked her to keep drawing the manga series. Takeuchi stated she had difficulty developing a story for the second arc, and the whole idea of Sailor Moon's daughter coming from a future attacked by the Black Moon Clan came from her editor, Fumio Osano. To give Takeuchi enough time to develop the second arc, Toei introduced in the anime the Hell Tree aliens, thus the Black Moon Clan does not feature in the first thirteen episodes of Sailor Moon R. In the DIC English adaptation of the anime, the Black Moon Clan is called "Negamoon Family". The term "Nega-" was also used for the "Negaverse" (the Dark Kingdom) in this adaptation, implying that the Black Moon Clan is related in some way to Queen Beryl and her cause, since the Dark Kingdom members use the term "Nega-" as a common prefix (e.g. "negapower", "negahistory" or "negamonsters").

The Black Moon Clan members follow the pattern of the Dark Kingdom of using minerals as namesakes. Four key figures of the Clan use the four precious stones: ruby, emerald, sapphire and diamond. The Specter Sisters are named after minerals kermesite, berthierite, petzite and calaverite. The Boule Brothers do not follow this pattern; instead, they are named after the scientific terms chirality and achirality. However, the term 'boule' (sounded out in katakana) is accompanied by the kanji '人造宝石', literally meaning a "man-made gemstone"; synthetic/artificial gemstones; and the English term 'boule' means "A single crystal ingot produced by synthetic means".

== Key figures ==
=== Prince Demand ===
Prince Demand (プリンス・デマンド, Purinsu Demando; also Prince Demande/Dimande, Prince Diamond) is the leader of Planet Nemesis in the 30th century. He is the older brother of Saphir.

Because of the Black Moon Clan's beliefs that the Legendary Silver Crystal is a corruptive force, Wiseman sought Demand out and convinced him to use the Malefic Black Crystal's power against Crystal Tokyo. Demand and his allies initially plan to use the Black Crystal's time manipulative powers to travel back in time to the 20th century as part of "Operation: Replay", intending kill the past versions of the "White Moon" members who established Crystal Tokyo: The Sailor Guardians and Mamoru. But Demand, wanting to see the Legendary Silver Crystal's power for himself, launched an attack that wiped out most of Crystal Tokyo in a display of power. It resulted with Demand encountering Neo-Queen Serenity as she rushed out of the Crystal Palace in search of her daughter, Chibiusa. This led to Demand becoming obsessed with Neo-Queen Serenity, which extended to her past self Usagi Tsukino as he abducted her during her visit to the 30th century. Demand intends to force Usagi to submit to him, but she eventually manages to escape. Demand later turns on Wiseman upon realizing that he used him and the rest of the Black Moon Clan, and is forced to kill Saphir as his brother is under Wiseman's spell. Demand then steals the Silver Crystal of the present from Usagi and that of the future from Black Lady, and attempts to bring them together to destroy the time-space continuum. However, Sailor Pluto uses her forbidden Time Stop attack and prevents Demand from attacking Usagi before she and Tuxedo Mask combine their powers to destroy him.

In the original anime adaptation, Demand has a similar story, with some differences. He initially intends to reason with Neo-Queen Serenity, explaining that he and his people are descendants of criminals, not criminals themselves. It is Wiseman, and not Demand himself, who kills Saphir, because the latter told his older brother that Wiseman has been manipulating them. In the final confrontation, Usagi too tries to persuade Demand to see that he is being manipulated by Wiseman. Between what Sailor Moon said and what he remembered Saphir trying to tell him, Demand is then positive that Wiseman was using him. When Wiseman tries to kill Usagi, Demand shields her from Wiseman's damage. Though fatally injured, he musters up enough strength to temporarily subdue Wiseman. Demand begged Usagi for forgiveness and asked her to watch over the remaining inhabitants of Nemesis, later dying in her arms.

In the anime reboot Sailor Moon Crystal, Demand's story closely follows that of the manga, but his death is similar to the original anime as he shields Sailor Moon from Death Phantom's attack. While openly stating his reason to personally kill her, Demand accepted her as his queen before being imploded by Death Phantom's power.

In the Sailor Moon: Another Story video game, Demand is encountered in the Moon Kingdom during Queen Beryl's invasion and ends up kidnapping Sailor Moon. Esmeraude mentions that Demand had the Barazuishou. When the Sailor Guardians catch up to Demand, the group is attacked by Sin. When the Guardians repel Sin, she manages to make a fatal blow on Demand quoting "That was for my mom and dad." Demand states that this is not the destiny he wanted and if he could have changed, it would have been so that there would not be any battles between the Black Moon Clan and Crystal Tokyo. Before he dies, he tells the Guardians to head to the future for if the future does not change, the present will.

In the Japanese series, Prince Demand is voiced by Kaneto Shiozawa until episode 41 of Sailor Moon R, and by Mamoru Miyano in Crystal and all media since. In the DIC English adaptation, his name is changed to Prince Diamond and is voiced by Robert Bockstael. In the Viz Media English adaptation, he is voiced by Matthew Mercer. In the musical adaptation, he has been played by Hikari Ono. Hikari jokingly commented that she was given "this completely unfeminine prince role", due to the fact that among cast members, Hikari was known for playing male or androgynous roles. These include Hawk's Eye, Kou Taiki, and Loof Merrow.

=== Rubeus ===
Crimson Rubeus (紅のルベウス, Kurenai no Rubeusu) is a red-haired human and the first member of the Black Moon Clan to appear in the 20th century. Introducing himself as the Black Moon's military commander, he is charged with the capture of Chibiusa after she fled into 20th Century Tokyo while sending the Specter Sisters on missions to ensure the operation's success. Though the Specter sisters are killed off, Rubeus manages to bring the captive Sailors Mars, Mercury, and Jupiter to Nemesis. Despite being loyal to Demand, his suspicions gaining further incentive when Neo-Queen Serenity channels herself through Sailor Moon. Rubeus expresses distrust towards Wiseman, which results with Rubeus being strangled to death by Wiseman when he attempts to flee during the meltdown of Malefic Black Crystal Reactor.

In Sailor Moon R, using an actual UFO rather than a time-space portal, Rubeus is presented in a more negative light as he is less sympathetic to the Specter Sisters and uses their love to take advantage of them as his expendable pawns. After the Specter Sisters were purified by Sailor Moon, warned by Esmeraude that Demand is losing his patience with him, Rubeus captures Usagi's protectors to force her into handing over the Silver Crystal. In the ensuing battle, Chibiusa destroys the crystal controlling his ship, freeing the Sailor Guardians as they return to Earth as the ship starts to explode. When Esmeraude shows up, Rubeus begs her to save him before his ship explodes. Esmeraude reminds Rubeus that he has failed too many times and that she is assuming command, before leaving Rubeus to die in the explosion.

Rubeus appears as a boss in the Another Story video game. He is encountered in the past outside of the Ark near the Temple of Venus in Rias.

In the anime, Crimson Rubeus was voiced by Wataru Takagi and by Hiroki Takahashi in Crystal. In the DIC English adaptation, he was voiced by Robert Tinkler. In the Viz Media English adaptation, he is voiced by Steve Cannon. In the musicals, Rubeus was portrayed by Hiroyuki Ichikawa and Riona Tatemichi.

=== Esmeraude ===
Green Esmeraude (翠のエスメロード, Midori no Esumerōdo) is a green-haired woman and the second of the Black Moon Clan to appear. She is a selfish, vain woman with an obsessed infatuation with Prince Demand, emulating a goddess-like appearance by wearing an elegant, tight-fitting dress along with opera-length gloves and knee-high stiletto boots. She has a distinctive laugh, loud and piercing, and is the most comedic member of the Black Moon. After she and her subordinates Chiral and Achiral, fail to kill Sailors Moon and Venus when they, Tuxedo Mask, and Chibiusa reach Crystal Tokyo, Esmeraude undertakes the mission "Code: Extra, Operation: Relax" to personally kill Chibiusa. When the two Sailor Guardians and Tuxedo Mask intervene, Esmeraude uses the Beast Arms ability she received from Wiseman to overwhelm them. But King Endymion's spirit appears behind Tuxedo Mask, allowing him to channel his future self's power to kill Esmeraude with a Tuxedo La Smoking Bomber attack.

In the original anime adaptation, warning Rubeus that Prince Demand is getting impatient and later leaving him to die, Esmeraude takes over the attacks on 20th Tokyo while expressing her disdain for Demand's obsession with Neo-Queen Serenity/Sailor Moon. Consumed by her jealousy and greed, Esmeraude receives a magic tiara from Wiseman that will give her the power to kill the Guardians after they arrive to Crystal Tokyo. But Esmeraude ends up being transformed into a green bipedal dragon, battling the Guardians when she attacks the Crystal Palace and is defeated by Sailor Moon. Reverted to her original state, Esmeraude plunges into a black void to her doom while her last words reach Demand.

Esmeraude appears as a boss in the Another Story video game. She is encountered in the past at the Kainess Ice Caves an optional boss where the Guardians fight her in dragon form and then in normal form. She mentions that Prince Demand has the Barazuishou.

She is voiced by Mami Koyama and by Houko Kuwashima in Crystal. In the DIC English adaptation, her name is changed to Emerald and is voiced by Kirsten Bishop. In the Viz Media English adaptation, she is played by Rena S. Mandel. In the musical, she is played by Miki Kawasaki and Mitsumi Hiromura.

=== Saphir ===
Blue Saphir (蒼のサフィール, Ao no Safīru; also Blue Sapphire) is the Black Moon's alchemist, and the loyal younger brother of Prince Demand. He is more cautious and rational than his companions. He is the only member of the Clan that does not wear earrings made from Black Crystal, despite having invented them.

Saphir prefers to work with droids creations and maintaining Nemesis's Malefic Black Crystal Reactor, which he compared to his brother in being unpredictable. While Saphir questioned Wiseman's intentions and Demand's lack of reasoning on the grounds that the latter's reasoning is being eroded, he only received disdain from his brother, who accused him of wanting the power for himself. When Demand brings Usagi to Nemesis and she stumbled into the reactor room, Saphir admits that their plans were insensible and that she was guiltless yet tries to kill her on the grounds that she and the Silver Crystal are still a source of conflict. But the 20th century Silver Crystal activates and its energies cause the reactor to meltdown, with Nemesis undergoing an evolution while Saphir and Demand are rescued by Black Lady and brought before Wiseman. Wiseman uses his power to place Saphir under his control and bestows with Beast Hands, only for Saphir to be killed off by a reluctant Demand who apologizes for his earlier remarks about his brother's loyalty to him.

In the original anime adaptation, Saphir grows up on Nemesis with Demand, who promised him that they will go to Earth one day and see real flowers. When Saphir overhears Wiseman's plans, he barely escapes with use the stolen Malefic Black Crystal to travel to 20th Century Earth where his wounds are tended to by Petz before the Sailor Guardians come to his aid. When Demand appears, Saphir attempts to warn him before Wiseman kills him in midsentence. Demand carries his brother's lifeless body, with the Black Moon no longer on his forehead, away to be properly buried.

In the Another Story video game, Saphir is encountered in the Moon Kingdom during Queen Beryl's invasion. He directs the Guardians to the basement of the Moon Palace where Prince Demand is holding Sailor Moon, later sacrificing himself to protect his brother from Sin.

Blue Saphir is voiced by Tsutomu Kashiwakura and by Tsubasa Yonaga in Crystal and Crystal film, Sailor Moon Cosmos. In the DIC English adaptation, his name is changed to Sapphire and he is voiced by Lyon Smith. In the Viz Media English adaptation, he is voiced by Greg Felden. In the musicals, he is played by Yuri Kuroda and Sora Manami.

=== Death Phantom ===
Death Phantom (デス・ファントム, Desu Fantomu), acting under the identity of Wiseman (ワイズマン, Waizuman), is an immortal form of Chaos from the future. Before the events of the series, Death Phantom was originally a human who lived in the city Crystal Tokyo, and possessed dark powers which he used to reintroduce chaos and mayhem to the utopia with powers like his extending Beast Hands and his hypnotic Evil Sight. Death Phantom was later defeated by Neo-Queen Serenity, who banished him to the planet Nemesis where he will live out the rest of his days. But when Death Phantom died, his spirit and consciousness integrated into Nemesis, becoming the planet itself. He cloaked his decayed and crumbled human body to serve as a puppet and returned to Earth under the identity of Wiseman to find discontent among humans, recruiting the founding members of the Black Moon Clan whose hate towards 30th-century utopia of Crystal Tokyo and the Silver Crystal he exploited for his own. Wiseman provided the Black Moon with his Malefic Black Crystal, orchestrating their attack on Crystal Tokyo and 20th century Tokyo to shatter the Silver Crystal while exacting his revenge on Neo-Queen Serenity. Wiseman later acquires the future Silver Crystal from Chibiusa whom he corrupted into Black Lady to take the 20th century Silver Crystal as well, revealing his true colors and form as Death Phantom. But Death Phantom is destroyed when Sailor Moon and the recently awaken Sailor Chibi Moon use their Silver Crystals to obliterate the entirety of Nemesis.

In the anime adaptation, the Black Moon Clan were the descendants of evil people who fled to Nemesis after having attacked Crystal Tokyo centuries before. Posing as Wiseman, Death Phantom approached Prince Demand and Saphir when they were younger. He manipulated the clan into gathering power for him, with the ultimate goal being the opening of the Dark Gate. He promised he could give them the power and ability to go to Earth and conquer it to avenge their ancestors whom Wiseman claimed had been shunned away to Nemesis by the people of Earth. Wiseman's influence warped the minds of his pawns until they carried out his true plan for the ultimate destruction of the planet Earth. Wiseman counsels Rubeus during his mission for a long time, but is unconcerned about his death. He humiliates Esmeraude when she comes to him asking to be the queen of Nemesis, and brings about her transformation into a dragon and, ultimately, her doom at the hands of Sailor Moon. He manipulates Chibiusa's childhood memories to make her believe that her past was unhappy and that she is always alone (this is a lie), turning her into Black Lady. Wiseman kills Saphir when Saphir realizes that he and his brother have been lied to. He ultimately kills Prince Demand when the man shielded Sailor Moon from his energy-blade. In the end, Death Phantom is killed, but Nemesis and its remaining inhabitants are saved.

He is voiced by Eiji Maruyama in the original series and by Hiroshi Iwasaki in Sailor Moon Crystal and Crystal film, Sailor Moon Cosmos. In the DIC English adaptation, Wiseman, dubbed as Doom Phantom, is voiced by Tony Daniels. In the Viz Media English adaptation and Sailor Moon Cosmos, he is voiced by Steve Kramer. In the 2000 musical Tanjou! Ankoku no Princess Black Lady, he was portrayed by Kenji Tominaga.

=== Black Lady ===
Black Lady, also known as Wicked Lady in the DiC English dub, is the evil form that Chibiusa assumed under Wiseman's influence with a lie, using her frustration of finding her place in the 30th Century to bring out her dark, malicious side and serve as his right hand. As Chibiusa's dream was to finally grow up and become a beautiful lady like her mother, Black Lady's form is something like a femme fatale with an overblown Electra complex.

Like her original self, she is voiced by Kae Araki in the first series and by Misato Fukuen in Crystal. In the DIC English adaptation, Black Lady's name is changed to Wicked Lady and is voiced by Liz Brown. In the Viz Media adaptation, she is voiced by Sandy Fox.

== Specter Sisters ==
The Four Specter Sisters (あやかしの四姉妹, Ayakashi no Yon Shimai) are a group of women that serve under Rubeus, each possessing a supernatural ability. They serve as the Black Moon's first line of offense in their attack on 20th Century Tokyo, their primary missions being the removal of Sailor Moon's four protectors and the capture of Chibiusa.

In the original anime adaptation, the Specter Sisters appear more frequently and their characters are expanded as shallow while eventually regretting their upbringing on Nemesis. Their mission is slightly altered to target strategic points that would be essential to Crystal Tokyo in the future. Compared to the manga and Crystal, the Specter Sisters are purified and allowed to remain in the 20th century while running a makeup stand.

The Specter Sisters appear as bosses on a spaceship in the Another Story video game.

=== Kōan ===
Kōan (コーアン) is the youngest of the Specter Sisters and represents a counterpart of Sailor Mars. Her name is short for kōankō (紅安鉱, kermesite) and her attack is "Dark Fire", which is called "Ice Fire" in the original dub. Her given human name is Kōan Kurozuki, with her last name meaning "black moon". Sensing Mars, Kōan receives Rubeus's blessing to "Code: 001, Operation: Recruit": Posing as a T.A Girls Academy student who is president of the supernatural club called the Black Moon. Kōan uses her fortune-telling ability to predict the impending deaths of people to recruit those she promises will die painlessly for the Black Moon's cause. She also uses her Dark Fire to incinerate others under the cover of spontaneous human combustion. Rei confronts Kōan so she reveals her true self, while Rei transforms into Sailor Mars. In the ensuing battle, Kōan traps Sailor Mars in a fire barrier but is killed by Sailor Moon when she first acquired the Cutie Moon Rod.

In the original anime, Kōan is very vain about her appearance to the point of swearing death upon anyone who smudges her make-up or ruins her hair, and she relies on her charms to get what she wants. She thinks that she and Rubeus are in a relationship, and competes with her sisters for his love. Kōan directly fights Sailor Mars and the others several times, with the climactic battle taking place at the Hikawa Shrine. After Kōan fails to capture Chibiusa, Rubeus reveals that she is a pawn and that he never loved her. Kōan snaps and attacks everyone in a blind rage, until Sailor Mars saves Kōan from getting hit by Sailor Jupiter, and convinces her that she is a good person that has been caught in a life of evil and that she deserves a second chance. She becomes the first sister purified with Sailor Moon's Silver Crystal. She later convinces each of her sisters to let Sailor Moon purify them.

In Japanese, Kōan is voiced by Wakana Yamazaki in Sailor Moon R and by Satsuki Yukino in Crystal. In the DiC English adaptation, her name is changed to Catzi and is first voiced by Alice Poon and later Mary Long. In the Viz Media English adaptation, she is voiced by Eden Riegel. In the musicals, she is portrayed by Seiko Takuma and Hinami Someya.

=== Berthier ===
Berthier (ベルチェ, Beruche) is the third oldest sister and represents a counterpart of Sailor Mercury. Her name is based on the mineral berthierite and her magical attack is "Dark water", carrying a dowsing pendulum made of Malefic Black Crystal. Berthier is sent by Rubeus to enact "Code: 002, Operation: Remove" to eliminate all opposition to the Black Moon which includes the Sailor Guardians. Berthier disguises herself as a normal human and wows people with her dowsing abilities prior to finding Ami Mizuno and deducing her as Sailor Mercury when she used her power to find a leak in a pipe at the school. Skilled at chess, Berthier goes on television to challenge Ami to a chess match. After losing the match despite having the advantage, a fight breaks out as Berthier manages to capture Mercury in a water barrier for the Black Moon before being killed by Sailor Moon.

In Sailor Moon R, Berthier has a very darkly playful personality, but is shown to have great respect for all of her sisters. She is the only one shown to be upset when Kōan is purified by the Silver Crystal. As with Ami, she is also a strategist and is incredibly talented at chess, though she apparently also cheats. She confronts Sailor Mercury in a game of chess. However, she is mocked for her failure by Calaveras and Petz, but Kōan persuades her that she is still loved and has a second chance. Berthier allows Sailor Moon to heal her. Later, she and Kōan, along with the Guardians, are able to convince their other two sisters to join them and become normal women.

She is voiced by Yuri Amano in Sailor Moon R and by Rumi Kasahara in Crystal. In the DiC English adaptation, her name is changed to Bertie and she is voiced by Kathleen Laskey. In the Viz Media English adaptation, she is voiced by Cindy Robinson. She is the only sister that does not appear in the first version of Ankoku no Princess Black Lady musical, but does she appear in the revision portrayed by Manami Wakayama.

=== Petz ===
Petz (ペッツ, Pettsu) is the oldest of the four sisters and is a counterpart of Sailor Jupiter. She is named for the mineral petzite and her attack is "Dark Thunder". Petz asks Rubeus to allow her the chance to avenge Kōan and Berthier by enacting "Code: 003, Operation: Renew": infecting those among Tokyo populace with a debilitating cold so they can be replaced with Droids. Makoto is infected by one of the viruses and destroys a Droid double that attacks her while she starts to pass out in her apartment. Petz manages to take advantage of Jupiter's weakened condition to capture her in a barrier before being obliterated from behind by Sailor Moon.

In Sailor Moon R, Petz often clashes with Calaveras, but the majority of both women's operations end up with them working together. She is very proud and is willing to step on others to achieve personal glory and power. She also appears bitter over a past relationship and reacts strongly when Calaveras teases her about it. After the treachery of Kōan and Berthier, Rubeus gives her a stick and instructs her to use it to kill the Sailor Guardians and reconvert her fallen sisters. The stick dramatically increases Petz's powers and also corrupts her personality; however, the Guardians intervene. Rubeus appears and reveals he did not expect Petz to defeat the Guardians and activates the stick to create a massive time-vacuum that threatens to pull in everyone around it. No longer possessed, Petz decides that she has enough power in her body to destroy the stick and jumps into the vortex to sacrifice herself to stop it. However, she is stopped by her other three sisters who convince her that they still love her. After the vortex is destroyed by the Guardians, Petz is purified along with Calaveras. Later, Petz and her sisters soon discover a wounded Saphir, whom Petz tends to even though she at first thinks he came to punish her sisters. It is then that Petz and Saphir are revealed to have been romantically involved, and that Saphir is the person who caused Petz to be embittered about men. After Saphir is killed by Wiseman, Petz senses his death and is heartbroken, but remembers how he smiled for her.

In Japanese, Petz is voiced by Megumi Ogata in Sailor Moon R, and by Wasabi Mizuta in Crystal. In the DIC English adaptation, her name is changed to "Prizma" and is voiced by Norma Dell'Agnese. In the Viz Media English adaptation, she is voiced by Jessica Gee. Petz is one of two female characters in the musical series to have been portrayed by trans woman actress Karen Yoda, and in another musical she is portrayed by Ai Ikegami.

=== Calaveras ===
Calaveras (カラベラス, Karaberasu) is the second oldest of the sisters and is a counterpart of Sailor Venus. She is named for the mineral calaverite and her attack is "Dark Beauty". The last of the Specter Sisters to attack, Calaveras is sent by Rubeus to enact "Code: 004, Operation: Rebirth": using her powers of mediumship to have Rubeus speak through her during a televised interview to promote a televised gathering of people the following day. The plan was for Calaveras to use her channeling powers to brainwash everyone at the event into joining a cult dedicated to the Black Moon. When Minako confronts her at the channeling, Artemis taking out TV cameras to prevent their enemy's influence from extending to the worldwide audience, Calaveras channels the three captive Sailor Guardians through the hypnotized Naru Osaka, Ittou Asanuma and Kotono Sarashina. Calaveras then uses her captives to channel the spirits of her sisters to use a Spirit Attack against Minako with the intend to kill, revealing that Rubeus is going after Usagi and Chibiusa at that moment. But Rubeus fails in eliminating them and Calaveras is killed by Sailor Moon when she comes to Sailor Venus's aid.

In Sailor Moon R, Calaveras is a petty woman who indulges in relentlessly teasing her other siblings, especially Petz. She also appears unwilling to do anything for herself. She never accepts a single mission and instead tags along on several of Petz's missions. Even her final mission is one of Petz's, in which the elder sister was asked to use a powerful stick to kill the Guardians and reclaim her now purified siblings Kōan and Berthier. While on the mission, Petz, corrupted by the stick, attempts to kill everyone, Calaveras included. Shocked by Petz's treachery, Calaveras is shown pity by Sailor Moon and eventually comes to understand human love. She then tells the other Guardians about the stick's power. When Rubeus arrives and uses the stick to create a time-vacuum on the bridge, Calaveras stops Petz from falling into the vortex by catching her sister using her whip. After the Guardians destroy the stick, Calaveras accepts purification and becomes a normal human woman.

In Japanese, she is voiced by Akiko Hiramatsu in Sailor Moon R, and by Tomoe Hanba in Crystal. In the DIC English adaptation, her name is changed to "Avery" and is voiced by Jennifer Griffiths. In the Viz Media English adaptation, she is voiced by Cassandra Lee Morris. In the musicals, she is portrayed by Ado Endoh.

== Servants ==
=== Boule Brothers ===
The Boule Brothers (人造宝石ブラザーズ（ブールブラザーズ）, Būru Burazāzu) Chiral (キラル, Kiraru) and Achiral (アキラル, Akiraru) are two Black Moon Clan members who are under the service of Esmeraude, even appearing on her page in the Materials Collection art book. The brothers' mission is "Code: 005, Operation: Remake." They greet the Sailor Guardians when they arrive in Crystal Tokyo. They create a replica of the Crystal Palace as a trap. When Sailor Moon attacks them, she is paralyzed by a magnetic field from a man-made crystal at her feet. Tuxedo Mask destroys the crystal by willing it to break, and the brothers are killed.

In Sailor Moon R, the brothers grow "Dark Henges" at Jūban Park and Jūban Elementary School. They cause all of the pupils and teachers at the school to fight each other. They attack Chibiusa's best friend, Momoko Momohara. The Guardians fight off Chiral and Achiral, but are at a disadvantage until Chibiusa unleashes her power and attacks them after Momoko takes a hit while trying to protect Chibiusa. They are finally destroyed by Sailor Moon with her Moon Princess Halation attack. In the DIC English dub, they are called "Doom and Gloom".

Chiral and Achiral are respectively voiced by Masashi Ebara and Ryōtarō Okiayu in the original series, and by Wataru Hatano and Kazunari Tanaka in Sailor Moon Crystal and all media since. In the Viz Media English adaptation, Chiral and Achiral are voiced by Doug Erholtz and Kyle Hebert respectively.

=== Musical-only characters ===
The musical Tanjou! Ankoku no Princess Black Lady introduced three new characters exclusive to this continuity: Spotted Tilmun (斑のティルムン, Mura no Tirumun), a male servant of the Clan, and twin girls Aaron (アロン, Aron) and Manna (マナ, Mana). Tilmun shares a friendship with the twins because all three of them are misfits within the Clan, with Tilmun having a half crescent black moon on his forehead, and Aaron and Manna not having any at all. When Wiseman begins killing the Black Moon members, Tilmun died protecting Aaron and Manna, while the girls are killed by him after Black Lady is reverted to Chibiusa.

Tilmum was played by Ikuya Moro, Aaron was played by Nagisa Adaniya, and Manna by Kasumi Suzuki.

== Droids ==
The Droids (ドロイド, Doroido) are the Black Moon Clan's army of monsters of the week. The droids are robot-like creatures resembling sand figurines; they have no eyes or mouths, and they can only produce screeching noises rather than words. The droids were manufactured by Saphir, using the power of the Black Crystal, and are all similar in shape and form; however, they are able to take on the guise of humans.

In the original anime adaptation, all of the droids are individuals with feminine forms, and all can talk. When they are destroyed, they dissolve into a pile of sand, implying that they are similar to their manga counterparts, though they also produce a gemstone with the Clan's moon on it that fades away after its defeat. The musicals also feature individual droids, though they are characters originating in these adaptations.

The video games feature droids from both the manga and the anime as common enemies, with the manga versions of the enemies referred to as "Shade". Jakoku, the droid that attacks Chibiusa in her nightmare during episode 75, appears as a boss in Another Story.

=== Veneti and Aquatici ===
Veneti (ヴェネティ, Veneti) and Aquatici (アクアティキ, Akuatiki) are a pair of Droids that appear in the manga, the musicals, and Sailor Moon Crystal. They are considered perfect creations by Saphir. Usagi stumbles onto the Black Crystal Reactor where she is attacked by Veneti and Aquatici alongside Saphir. The two Droids are destroyed by the overflowing energy of golden light from Usagi and the crystal encasing Neo-Queen Serenity. In the manga, unlike all other droids, Veneti and Aquatici are wisp-like beings, while in the musicals they are humanoid. Veneti has a masculine form in the manga while Aquatici has a feminine form, but it is unknown if they have genders. They are both played by female actors in the musical.

In Crystal, they are voiced respectively by Yukiko Morishita and Hitomi Oowada, while Tara Sands voices both of them in the English adaptation. In the musicals, Veneti was played by Izumi Ogino and Aquatici was played by Yuka Kuwahara.

== Reception ==
The members of the Black Moon Clan are called by Navok and Rudranath "a separatist faction" that not only refused to live under the reign of Neo-Queen Serenity, but were also manipulated by Wiseman into destroying Tokyo in the past in order to prevent the founding of Crystal Tokyo. The authors also compare Black Moon's attack on Crystal Tokyo with the atomic bombings of Hiroshima and Nagasaki. On an article on shinto, feminism and anime, author Sarah Reeves considered that Black Lady's overall misconduct and strategies are the result of a lack of husband and children, which can be explained by Chibiusa herself not being an adult and her platonic love not being requited by Tuxedo Mask.

Rebecca Silverman reviewed the Sailor Moon R blu-ray + DVD combo pack for Anime News Network and liked the fact that Black Moon members were given character development and were not just "one-off monsters, with the Specter Sisters being particularly good examples of this." She particularly focused on the relationship between Petz and Saphir, describing their scenes together as "touching and depressing", while serving as a "counterpoint to Usagi and Mamoru's relationship." The author noted the contrast between humorous scenes like that of Esmeraude showing up to battle in her bathrobe, and the transformation sequence of Chibiusa into Black Lady where her breasts and buttocks surprisingly enlarge, which she considered "nice, albeit awkward". Silverman praised voice actress Rena S. Mandel for her role as Esmeraude, saying she did a good English equivalent job of the Japanese good old "Oh ho ho ho" laugh.

While reviewing the second season of Sailor Moon Crystal, IGN writer Meghan Sullivan compared the Black Moon Clan to the previous villain group, the Dark Kingdom, and said that "Prince Diamond (Demand)'s court seems far deadlier than Metalia and her generals." In a later episode review, Sullivan admitted that while Esmeraude strangling Chibiusa or Demand kidnapping Usagi was "pretty darn disturbing", she was actually enjoying Black Moon's more aggressive tactics, as "it makes them feel like a legitimate threat, which in turn will make the Sailor Guardians' final victory over them all the sweeter." Regarding Demand's motivations, Sullivan asked "He attacked Earth because he thinks peace and longevity are unnatural? That didn't make much sense to me, given how he murdered the entire population of Crystal Tokyo and tried to alter history." Commenting on Wiseman, Sullivan described the revelation that he is actually Planet Nemesis itself as a "planet-sized bomb", and in the next episode review, she gave him "props for being tenacious" after showing yet another form: Death Phantom.

== See also ==
- Planets beyond Neptune
- Planet Nine
- Nemesis (hypothetical star)

== Works cited ==
- Navok, J; Rudranath, S.K. (2005). Warriors of Legend: Reflections of Japan in Sailor Moon. BookSurge, LLC. ISBN 978-1419608148.
