= Kirsten Bishopric =

Canadian actress (1963–2014)

- Born: Kirsten Johanne Alice Bishopric; September 6, 1963; Montreal, Quebec, Canada
- Died: April 15, 2014 (aged 50); Toronto, Ontario, Canada
- Other name: Kirsten Bishop
- Education: Dawson College
- Occupation: Actress
- Years active: 1975–2012
- Spouse: Douglas Roberts
- Children: 2
- Relatives: Thor Bishopric (brother)

Kirsten Johanne Alice Bishopric (September 6, 1963 – April 15, 2014), also known as Kirsten Bishop, was a Canadian actress best known for providing the voices of Zoycite, Emerald, Kaorinite, and Badiyanu in the original English adaptation of Sailor Moon.

== Early life ==
Bishopric was born on September 6, 1963, in Montreal, to Shirley JoAnn Bishopric (née Blöndal), a model and interior designer of Icelandic descent, and John Grenfell (né Bishopric), who was a radio announcer at the local Canadian Broadcasting Corporation radio station. Her younger brother, Thor, is an actor, writer, voice actor, voice director, and also a vice-president of ACTRA.

== Personal life ==
Bishopric was married to Douglas Roberts with whom she had two children.

== Death ==
Bishopric died from lung cancer in Toronto on April 15, 2014.

== Filmography ==
=== Film ===
Year	Title	Role	Notes
1975	Hans Christian Andersen's The Little Mermaid	Marina (The Little Mermaid)	English version, Voice
1975	Shivers	Elevator Daughter	
1978	Jacob Two-Two Meets the Hooded Fang	Marfa	
1981	Gas	Bobby's Girlfriend	
1982	Visiting Hours	Denise	
1983	The Wars	Peggy Ross	
1985	Discussions in Bioethics: Critical Choice		Short
1986	Choices	Dana	TV movie
1986	Barnum	Nancy	TV movie
1987	Shades of Love: Champagne for Two	Cody	Direct-to-video
1987	The Big Town	Adele	
1991	Final Judgment	Emily	TV movie
1995	Cagney & Lacey: The View Through the Glass Ceiling	Pam Bustany	TV movie
1998	Jerry and Tom	Dead Blonde	
1998	Bone Daddy	Leslie	
1998	Tommy and the Wildcat	Helena	English version, Voice
1999	Killer Deal	Senator Dawson's Wife	TV movie
2000	Frequency	Carrie Reynolds	
2000	On Hostile Ground	Woman in BMW	TV movie
2000	Sailor Moon Super S: The Movie: Black Dream Hole	Badiyanu	Voice
2000	Papa's Angels	Jessica	TV movie
2001	Bojangles	Shirley's Mom	TV movie
2001	Dying to Dance	Dr. Elizabeth Elkins	TV movie
2002	Surrender	Mary Foley (adult)	Short
2002	The Interrogation of Michael Crowe	Mrs. Treadway	TV movie
2003	America's Prince: The John F. Kennedy Jr. Story	Caroline Kennedy	TV movie
2003	Rudy: The Rudy Giuliani Story	Judith Giuliani	TV movie
2004	Suburban Madness	Pam Wright	TV movie
2009	A Touch of Grey	Patti	
2009	Dream Girl	Sue	Short
2012	An Officer and a Murderer	Mrs. Dewalt	TV movie
2015	The Babysitter	Mother	Short
2015	Seeing Red	Blonde	Short, (final film role)

=== TV Series ===
Year	Title	Role	Notes
1982	Little Gloria... Happy at Last		Miniseries
1986	He Shoots, He Scores	Belinda	Episode: "Episode #1.5"
1987	Night Heat	Abby Malvern	Episode: "Punk"
1988–1989	Ramona	Aunt Beatrice	5 episodes
1990	B.B. and Jennifer	Jennifer	All episodes
1994	Kung Fu: The Legend Continues	Carol	Episode: "Only the Strong Survive"
1995–2000	Sailor Moon	Zoycite / Emerald / Kaorinite	Voice, 58 episodes
1997	Goosebumps	Mrs. Morris	Episodes: "One Day at Horrorland: Parts 1 & 2"
1998	Real Kids, Real Adventures	Mrs. Cooke	Episode: "Rescue of the Tetons"
2001	Twice in a Lifetime	Kelly	Episode: "Daddy's Girl"
2003	Veritas: The Quest	Deputy Keiran	Episode: "Avalon"
2003	Sue Thomas: F.B.Eye	Missy	Episode: "He Said She Said"
2004	Radio Free Roscoe		Episode: "There Will Be No Encore Tonight"
2005	The West Wing	Janice Jardin	Episode: "Opposition Research"
2005	Kevin Hill	Lisa Cooper	Episode: "In This Corner"
2005	This Is Wonderland		Episode: "Episode #3.4"
2008	The Border	Mrs. Johanson	Episode: "Grave Concern"
2010	Nikita	Mrs. Harcourt / Irene	Episode: "Phoenix"
2011	Good Dog	Network Exec #2	Episode: "I Never Met a Phor I Didn't Use"
2012	Warehouse 13	Gwen Ashton	Episode: "Personal Effects"
