= Bishōjo Senshi Sailor Moon: Another Story =

1995 video game

- Developer: Angel
- Publisher: Angel
- Director: Jōji Yuno
- Producer: Masayuki Sato
- Designers: Shūichi Miyazawa; Takuma Kiuchi; Yasuhiro Sato
- Programmer: Arbeiter Siina
- Artists: Etsuko Hamanaga; Junichi Fujita; Yoko Ino
- Writers: Takashi Ikegaya; Yoshijirō Muramatsu
- Composer: Takanori Arisawa
- Series: Sailor Moon
- Platform: Super Famicom
- Release: JP: 22 September 1995
- Genre: Role-playing video game
- Mode: Single-player

Bishōjo Senshi Sailor Moon: Another Story (Note: Japanese: 美少女戦士セーラームーン: Another Story, Hepburn: Bishōjo Senshi Sērā Mūn: Another Story; lit. "Pretty Soldier Sailor Moon: Another Story") is a role-playing video game developed and published by Angel exclusively for the Super Famicom in Japan on 22 September 1995. Based upon Naoko Takeuchi's Sailor Moon shōjo manga and anime series, the game takes place between the third season and fourth season of the anime series, which adapted the third and fourth arcs of the manga respectively, as players take control of either the five Inner Guardians or the four Outer Guardians in order to protect Crystal Tokyo by fighting against a group of rebels and several of their previously defeated enemies once again that were resurrected by the sorceress Apsu.

Bishōjo Senshi Sailor Moon: Another Story was developed over the course of two years by most of the same team who worked on previously released titles in the Sailor Moon franchise for the Super Famicom at Angel and featured an original plot written by Takashi Ikegaya and Yoshijirō Muramatsu, however multiple issues were faced during production before its eventual launch to the market. The game has never been officially released outside Japan, although fan translations exist.

== Gameplay ==
Gameplay screenshot.

Bishōjo Senshi Sailor Moon: Another Story is a role-playing game (RPG) that takes place from a top-down perspective similar to other games in the genre such as Chrono Trigger, where the player controls the protagonist and her companions in the game's two-dimensional fictional world that consists of various locations. Areas are depicted as realistic scaled-down maps, in which players can converse with locals to procure items and services, solve puzzles and challenges, or encounter enemies. Enemies ambush the party with random encounters on a field map and initiates a battle that occurs directly on a separate battle screen.

The player and enemies can use physical or magical attacks to wound their respective targets during battle encounters, and the player may also use items to heal or protect themselves. Each character and enemy has a certain number of hit points, which can be reduced with successful attacks that decreases their hit points, although it can be restored during the next turn. During battle, compatible Sailor Guardians (2 or 3) can use "Link Techniques", which are unique team up attacks with various effects. All ten Sailor Guardians are playable, though only five members of each Guardian team can join the player's party at one time. On certain occasions, the plot dictates which Guardians are playable but the player may choose to build their party, however certain characters are still required to be in the party during certain story points.

After reaching the last area, two possible outcomes can occur during the final boss sequence depending on the actions taken by the player; If the player manages to defeat the final boss, the good ending is achieved but if the player loses against the boss, Chibiusa and the remaining Guardians will fight a slightly easier form of it and the player will automatically receive the bad ending instead. Through the journey, the player can also collect puzzle pieces which make an image of the Guardians and Tuxedo Mask. If the puzzle is completed, there is a reward at the end of the game.

== Plot ==
In Another Story, a sorceress named Apsu arrives from the 30th century. She has formed a group of girls from Crystal Tokyo known as the "Oppositio Guardians" and ordered them to alter the past in order to change the future to her liking, with the ultimate goal of attaining the Silver Crystal. Apsu and her followers succeed in changing the fates of the defeated villains from the first three-story arcs, bringing deceased villains back to life and turning reformed and healed individuals back to the darkness. With the advice of the ghosts of the Four Kings of Heaven, the Guardians set out to regain the Barazuishō (Rose Crystal), Tuxedo Mask's stone (which replaces the Golden Crystal in the game) in order to change Sailor Moon's destiny back and to save Crystal Tokyo.

== Development ==
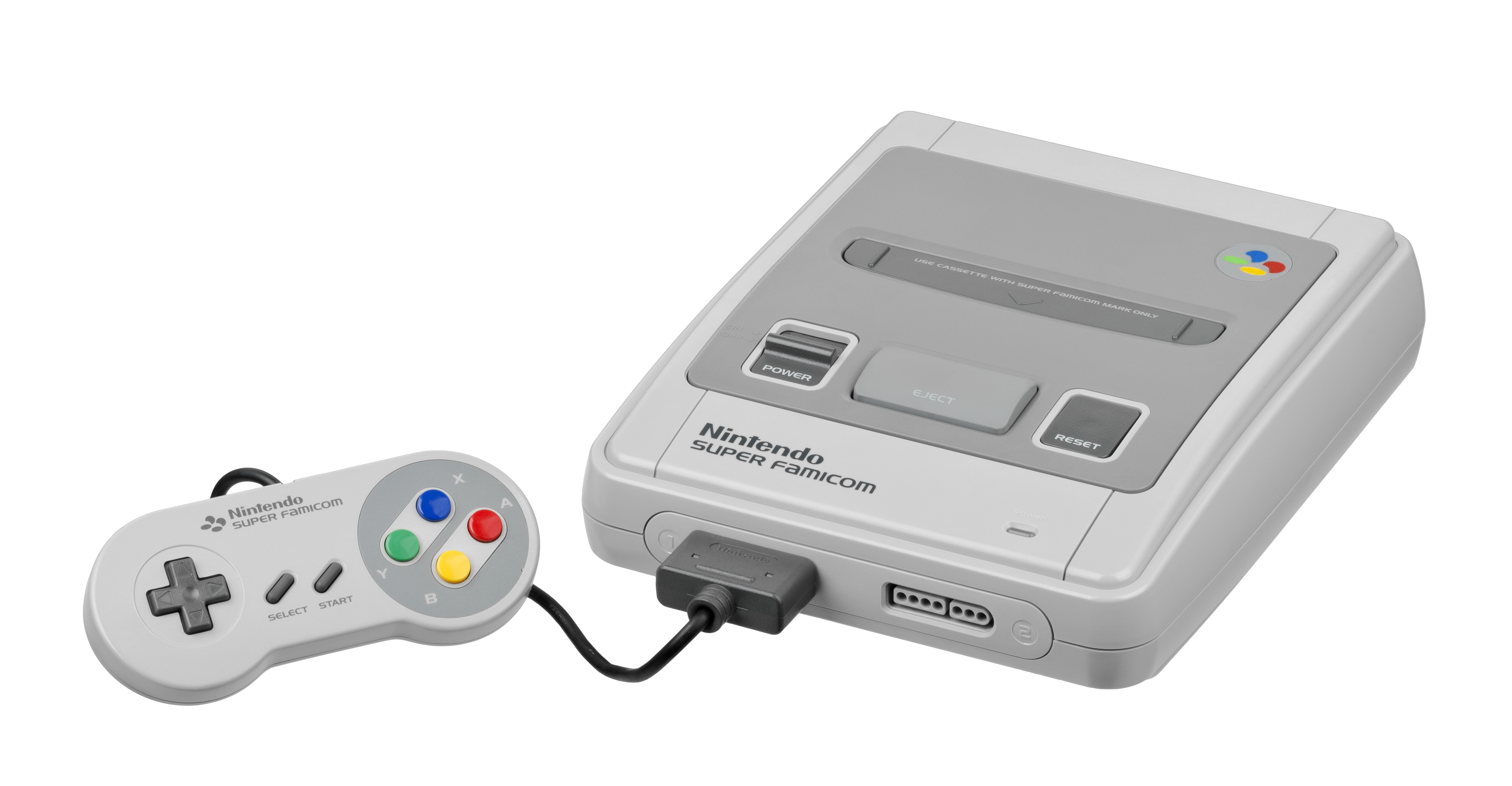
Bishōjo Senshi Sailor Moon: Another Story was developed by most of the original team who worked in previous titles based on Sailor Moon exclusively for the Super Famicom.

Bishōjo Senshi Sailor Moon: Another Story was created over the course of two years by most of the same team who worked on previously released titles in the Sailor Moon franchise for the Super Famicom at Angel. Its development was helmed by producer Masayuki Sato alongside director Jōji Yuno, while Nakayoshi editor Fumio Osano supervised its production. Shūichi Miyazawa, Takuma Kiuchi and Yasuhiro Sato served as designers, while Miyazawa also contributed as a graphic artist along with Etsuko Hamanaga, Junichi Fujita and Yoko Ino. The original plot was conceived by writers Takashi Ikegaya and Yoshijirō Muramatsu, while Takanori Arisawa acted as music composer, among other members collaborating with the project.

The development process and history of Bishōjo Senshi Sailor Moon: Another Story was recounted by several members of the team in an official strategy guide by Kodansha from December 1995, three months after the game's release to the market. The team faced issues when writing its plot during development, as the Sailor Moon manga was still being serialized and the third arc was not fishined at the time, in addition of other characters and elements from the series that were not fully introduced yet despite receiving design materials from Takeuchi for guidance according to Ikegaya, with Yuno stating it was reckless making an original story for a manga that was still in publication. Various NPCs were added so the plot could have cohesion, as the team originally created the title with intentions to feature the Mugen Gakuen school. Miyazawa stated they could not do anything they wanted despite the title of the project.

The development team placed emphasis in both depiction and personality of enemies, as Yuno stated that the main characters were already explored through multiple Sailor Moon-related releases, leading to the introduction of the Oppositio Guardians as a way to explore the inverted desire of girls wanting to be Sailor Guardians, among other elements in the series. Work on the project began without a set theme, however Yuno claimed that Osano wanted the plot to have each character embarking on their own journey, while Miyazawa stated that the development team originally planned to have battles take place in real-time on the playfield but Yuno later stated that due to being a character-based title, the team felt this playstyle would not work. Implementing ten playable characters on the game also proved to be a challenge for the team, as not many role-playing games at the time attempted such feature, while their relationships during cutscenes were taken into account and Osano supervised this aspect of the project as well. The team also placed importance in regards to the audio design, while seiyūs from the anime series returned to reprise their roles.

The team at Angel also borrowed elements from their previous games based on Sailor Moon such as special attacks and music, with Yuno referring it as "something of a compilation of the other Super Famicom games we’ve made so far". Elements from Sailor Moon S: The Movie were also integrated into the game as well, as Miyazawa stated they left empty memory data on purpose after production of the film was settled before launch, while item integration proved to be another difficult process during development due to the team needing them to feel part of the series, though other gameplay elements such as the accessories were implemented late into development.

== Release ==
Bishōjo Senshi Sailor Moon: Another Story was published by Angel exclusively in Japan on 22 September 1995. On 21 February 1996, an album containing music from the game published exclusively in Japan by Nippon Columbia, while another album released by Columbia on 26 May of the same year in Japan as well that featured music from the anime series contained an extra track from the title. The game was not officially released outside Japan; however, English fan translation patches for ROM images exist.

== Reception ==
Reception

Review scores
Publication	Score
Famitsu	23/40
RPGamer	3.5/5.0

Famitsu reported that the title sold over 33,149 copies in its first week on the market. Bruno Sol of Spanish magazine Superjuegos gave a positive outlook to the game. Spanish publication Minami regarded it to be a "magnificent role-playing game". Justin Holmes of AllRPG gave a positive retrospective review of the title, praising several aspects such as the presentation, graphics and battle system, giving it a 8.1 rating out of ten. Argentinian website Malditos Nerds ranked it as number one on their top Sailor Moon games.
