= Sailor Mercury =

Fictional character in Sailor Moon

- Sailor Moon character
- Ami in her Super Sailor Mercury form as seen in Season 4 of the 1990s anime
- First appearance: Sailor Moon chapter #2: "Ami – Sailor Mercury" (1992)
- Created by: Naoko Takeuchi
- Voiced by: Japanese: Aya Hisakawa; Hisako Kanemoto (Sailor Moon Crystal); English: Karen Bernstein (DiC dub); Liza Balkan (CWi dub); Kate Higgins (Viz dub)
- Portrayed by: Rika Izumi; Tamaki Matsumoto (childhood)
- Birthday: September 10

In-universe information
- Full name: Ami Mizuno
- Aliases: Princess Mercury; Dark Mercury (PGSM)
- Family: Mr. Mizuno (father); Saeko Mizuno (mother)
- Children: Ami Mizuno (daughter; "Parallel Sailor Moon" only)
- Nationality: Japanese
- Affiliations: Sailor Guardians; Dark Kingdom (when brainwashed, PGSM); Shadow Galactica (manga and Sailor Moon Crystal)
- Powers and abilities: Hydrokinesis; Atmidokinesis; Cryokinesis; Data collection Genius-level intellect

Ami Mizuno (Japanese: 水野 亜美, Hepburn: Mizuno Ami; renamed "Amy Anderson" or "Amy Mizuno" in some English adaptations), better known as Sailor Mercury (Japanese: セーラーマーキュリー, Hepburn: Sērā Mākyurī) is a fictional character in the Sailor Moon manga series created by Naoko Takeuchi, a teenage Japanese schoolgirl, and a member of the Sailor Guardians, supernatural female fighters who protect the Solar System from evil.

Sailor Mercury is the first Sailor Guardian to be discovered by Sailor Moon. She serves as the "brains" of the group, as she is highly intelligent and can also use a supercomputer to collect useful information in battles. She possesses powers associated with water in all of its forms, including ice.

Aside from the main body of the Sailor Moon series, Ami features in her own short story in the manga Ami's First Love. Originally published in volume fourteen of the manga, this was the only one of three "Exam Battle" stories to be made into a special for the anime which makes her one of the most recognizable and popular characters in the series. A number of image songs mentioning Ami's character have been released as well, including the contents of three different 3-inch CD singles.

== Profile ==
Ami's most emphasized character trait is that she is extremely intelligent—in the anime and manga she is rumored by other characters to have an IQ of three hundred, while in the stage musicals this is stated as a fact. She is adept at English in both the musicals and the anime, and in the live action it was clearly, although briefly, demonstrated by the actress portraying her (actress Chisaki Hama was speaking to an English speaking character as her character was visiting the United States as a medical intern). Her peers view her with a mixture of awe and distaste, misinterpreting her inherent shyness as snobbery, and so she tends to have a difficult time making new friends. Ami is depicted as kind, sweet, gentle, and loyal, as well as slightly insecure. She also dislikes the fights of Sailor Moon and Sailor Mars. Anne Allison describes her as "a smart girl who needs to relax", calling her "conscientious" and "studious", "everything Usagi is not". Early on in the story, she relies heavily on the approval of her mother, teachers, and friends, but as the series progresses she becomes stronger and more confident in herself. She is generally the most sensible of the main characters, and is often the only one embarrassed when the group has a dull-witted moment. As the story begins, she attends Azabu Jūban Junior High along with Usagi Tsukino and, later, Makoto Kino.

Ami in her school uniform, drawn by Naoko Takeuchi

Throughout the series, much of Ami's free time is spent studying. She loves to read, and dreams aloud of one day being a doctor like her mother and becomes one in both Parallel Sailor Moon and the live action series. In the musicals, Ami's dream of being a doctor and leaving Japan to study abroad is a recurring theme. The first part of the song Dream Yume wa Ookiku (ドリーム 夢は大きく, lit. Dream - Dreams are Huge) shows Ami's conflict between studying abroad and growing up or being with everyone else and staying a young girl. She faces a similar dilemma in the anime, but very directly; given the opportunity to study in Germany, she gets as far as the airport before deciding to stay in Japan and fight evil alongside her friends.

Ami has a great appreciation for art as well as science, and, contrary to the usual depiction of a bibliophile, enjoys pop culture and romance novels (though she is usually embarrassed to admit it). In both the anime and the manga, Ami's diligence in her studies becomes a running gag; she often comically scolds Usagi and the others for not doing their homework, and she can become obsessive about being the best student. Her character has been interpreted as a political commentary on the education system of Japan. She sometimes displays attraction to boys her age, and other times aversion to the idea. Love letters are listed as the one thing she has most trouble with, and when she later receives one, it gives her a rash. In the anime, a classmate named Ryo Urawa learns her identity and expresses attraction to her, but this is never resolved, as he disappears after just two appearances in the first series.

Besides reading, Ami is shown playing chess and swimming in order to relax. As the team scholar, computers are listed her strong point; she even belongs to the club at school. She loves all her classes, especially mathematics. Her favorite foods are given as sandwiches and anmitsu, with her least favorite being yellowtail. Other loves include cats, the colors aquamarine and blue, the flower Water Lily, and the gemstone sapphire.

Ami is one of the few girls in the series whose family situation is explicitly mentioned in the anime. Her parents are divorced, and she lives with her mother, a busy doctor who is not home very often, named Saeko in the live-action series. They look very similar, and Ami admires her mother and longs to live up to her example. Besides her workaholic tendencies, Dr. Mizuno is portrayed as a good person who openly resents not having more time to spend with her daughter. Ami's father is never named but is stated in the manga and anime to be a painter. The manga says that he never visits them, having decided one day not to come home from the forest where he was relaxing and painting, but he sends her postcards on her birthday. Thinking about this, Ami sometimes resents her parents' selfishness in separating, partly because divorce in Japan is taboo. However, in the anime Ami seems to appreciate her father and seems to share some of his artistic traits, at one point even composing matching lyrics for a tune that had none. In the manga, Ami's mother is revealed to be fairly rich, as they live in a condominium. Ami is shown testing the strength of a sword that the Sailor Guardians received on the Moon by using it to chip a diamond ring. (Classically, a diamond is the hardest mineral.) When the girls panic, she calms them by saying that her mother has many more. In the live-action series, Ami is especially shy and usually wears glasses while in public, even though she does not need them. At her middle school, she has no friends before meeting Usagi and always eats lunch alone on the roof so she can study. Usagi seems to be the only one to realize that Ami is merely shy, not truly standoffish, and befriending her gradually helps Ami to learn that she is more than just a bibliophile. By Act 34, when Ami's mother attempts to transfer her to another school because she thinks Ami's friends are bad influences, Ami rebels, avoiding the admission interview and spending the night at the Sailor Guardians' hideout with Rei Hino. Later she tells her mother that what she is doing in her life right now is more important than studying, and her mother understands.

Ami is a kind and gentle girl who dislikes quarrels and abhors harming innocent people. These traits are even cited in the title of an anime episode, "Believe in Love! Ami, a Kind-Hearted Guardian", where she persuaded Sailor Uranus and Sailor Neptune not to kill Hotaru. Like her comrades, her loyalty to Sailor Moon is unwavering, and she would sacrifice her life for her princess if necessary.

== Aspects and forms ==
As a character with different incarnations, special abilities, powers, transformations, and ageless extended longevity; an extremely long lifetime virtually spanned between the Silver Millennium era and the 30th century, Ami gains multiple aspects and aliases as the series progresses.

=== Sailor Mercury ===
Ami's Sailor Guardian identity is Sailor Mercury. She wears a uniform colored in shades of blue from her fuku to her high heel boots. In the manga and live-action series, her outfit is initially sleeveless and she has three blue studs in each of her ears. Her Sailor Moon Crystal design is largely faithful to her manga design, with the exception of having one blue stud on her right ear, and three on the left. In contrast, the original anime initially depicted her with sleeves and a single blue stud in each ear. Sailor Mercury is given specific titles throughout the various series, including Guardian of Water and Wisdom, Guardian of Intelligence, Guardian of Justice and Wisdom, and Guardian of Love and Exams. Her personality is no different from when she is a civilian, although certain special abilities are unavailable to her in that form.

In Japanese, the name for the planet Mercury is Suisei (水星), the first kanji meaning "water" and the second indicating a celestial object. Although the Roman planet-name is used, Sailor Mercury's abilities are water-based due to this aspect of Japanese mythology. Initially most of her powers are strategic rather than offensive, and she possesses various pieces of computerized equipment to help her study the enemy.

As she grows much stronger and more powerful, Sailor Mercury gains additional powers, and at key points her uniform changes to reflect this. The first change takes place in Act 35 of the manga, when she obtains the Mercury Crystal and her outfit becomes similar to that of Super Sailor Moon. She is not given a new title. A similar event is divided between episodes 143 and 151 of the anime, and she is given the name Super Sailor Mercury. A third form appears in Act 42 of the manga, unnamed but similar to Eternal Sailor Moon (without wings). In the official visual book for Sailor Moon Eternal, this form was named "Eternal Sailor Mercury".

=== Dark Mercury ===
In the live action series, Ami is briefly taken over by the power of the Dark Kingdom and becomes Dark Mercury (ダークマーキュリー, Dāku Mākyurī). This form first appears in Act 21, as a servant of Kunzite. Her sailor suit has black tulle and lace on the back bow and sleeves, and tribal designs appear on her tiara and boots. She also gains a chain with a black charm on it around her waist. Her transformation phrase is Dark Power! Make-up! and is said in a much darker tone. She wields a sword fashioned from an icicle, which she creates herself the first time her transformation is displayed. In promotional photos prior to her premiere, she was shown with a different sword, which seemed to have strings on it like a harp or violin; the latter seems more likely, as she is also seen holding a bow. This bow was redecorated and given to Zoisite for use as a sword.

Dark Mercury is created when Kunzite manages to kidnap Ami in a moment of vulnerability while the other Sailor Guardians are busy. He exposes her directly to the power of Queen Metaria, causing drastic personality changes as well as the alterations to her uniform. She is self-confident to the point of egotism, and continues to attend school in civilian form, mainly to antagonize Usagi by brainwashing all of her former friends. Dressing predominantly in black, evil-Ami tends to move about slowly and dramatically, and when confronting the Sailor Guardians gives a sense of sadistic glee.

Dark Mercury has no intention of being a follower to anyone, and is always trying to pursue her own agenda, which is to kill her friends and become as strong as possible. She shows blatant disrespect to Kunzite and the other Kings of Heaven, even to Queen Beryl, perhaps because, unlike even the Four Kings of Heaven, she had been directly exposed to Metaria's power during her conversion, as opposed to having Queen Beryl or another intermediary filtering it.

Despite these alterations, certain aspects of the real Ami still remain. She still wants to do well in school, and wants friends, hence the brainwashing of her classmates. She seems to retain a sense of sympathy, which is evident when she repairs Nephrite's cape for him, stating that she does not like to see him alone.

Periodically, Sailor Moon attempts to heal her friend with the power of the Silver Crystal. Mercury is always snatched away before this can be completed, but it has some effect, ultimately resulting in her recovery. In Act 28, the catalyst for her finally returning to normal is when, having defeated Sailor Moon in battle, the sight of her injured friend causes her to realize she cares about Usagi, and to remember who she really is. After being healed, she has no memories of what happened while she was Dark Mercury. This haunts her, as she becomes terrified of what she may have done to her friends while not in control.

=== Princess Mercury ===
According to the manga, during the age of Silver Millennium, Sailor Mercury was also the Princess of her home planet. She was among those given the duty of protecting Princess Serenity of Silver Millennium. As Princess Mercury, she dwelt in Mariner Castle and wore a light blue gown—she appears in this form in the original manga and in supplementary art. Naoko Takeuchi once drew her in the arms of Zoisite, but no further romantic link between them was established in the manga or the original anime adaptation. However, in Sailor Moon Crystal, it is clearly stated that Sailor Mercury and Zoisite were in love during the Silver Millennium. This is also established in the first stage musical, and in the later Eien Densetsu, where Ami and a disguised Zoisite share a duet, "A Fabricated Forevermore" (偽りのForevermore, Itsuwari no forevermore).

== Special powers and items ==
Sailor Mercury using Shine Aqua Illusion in Sailor Moon Crystal

Sailor Mercury has the power to create and manipulate water. In the manga, Ami can dowse without any aids. She must first transform into a Sailor Guardian by shouting a special phrase, originally "Mercury Power, Make-up!" As she becomes more powerful and obtains new transformation devices, this phrase changes with her in the third season of the anime, and Crystal Power allows her to change to her Super form; but if she shouts, "Crystal Power" in said form in the Eternal and Cosmos films, she transforms into a higher form, the Eternal form.

One of Sailor Mercury's major offensive attacks is Shine Aqua Illusion, introduced in Sailor Moon R, which can be used as a projectile to damage or freeze the enemy. Aside from variations on her other powers (mostly improving their strength with the addition of "Freezing" or "Snow"), her next named attack is Mercury Aqua Mirage, used occasionally in the manga and again in the special side-story "Ami's First Love" (manga and anime) and she also uses this attack in Crystal. As Super Sailor Mercury, she acquires the Mercury Rod. Another power, Mercury Aqua Rhapsody, lets her make a harp with water and use it as a weapon by surging water at her targets.

In addition to her own powers, Sailor Mercury has more non-magical items than any other Sailor Guardian. Early on in the series she makes frequent use of a powerful portable "Pocket Computer" that enables her to make special calculations, scan her surroundings, track the movements of allies as well as foes, and determine her enemies' weak points. (Note: The computer is called 「ポケットコンピューター」 in Japanese.) The computer is part of her tiara. It works in sync with her Mercury Goggle, which lets her analyze the presence of monsters.

== Development ==
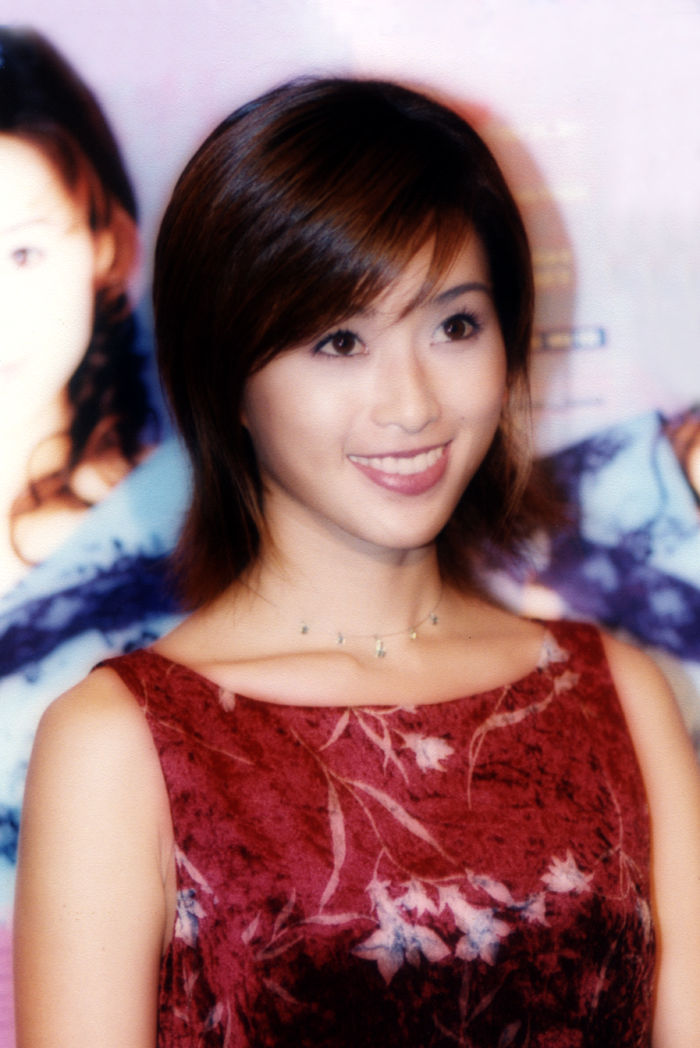
Noriko Sakai, 1998 - Takeuchi describes Ami as looking like Noriko Sakai.

Ami was not included in the original proposal for a hypothetical Codename: Sailor V anime, which instead featured Minako's very similar-looking best friend from that series, Hikaru Sorano. She was present, however, by the time the concept was expanded to center on Sailor Moon.

Creator Naoko Takeuchi designed Ami as the "team brain", giving her genius-level intelligence to create the impression that she was not quite human; in fact, the character was originally intended to be a cyborg with an accelerator. One possible storyline involved her losing an arm or being injured in some other way and dying from it, but Takeuchi's editor objected, so Ami became a fully human character.

Sailor Mercury's original costume design, like the others', was fully unique. It featured full-length sleeves, pink ribbons, shoulder guards, green accents, buttons on the stomach, and high-tech goggles. Later, Takeuchi was surprised by these sketches and stated that she did not remember drawing them. She also describes Ami as looking like Noriko Sakai, a J-pop idol of the early 1990s, and in Ami's original debut, Usagi thinks to herself that Ami resembles Miss Rain, a character from another Takeuchi series. This reference was removed in the 2003 renewal manga.

The kanji in Ami's last name translate as "water" (水, mizu) and "field" or "civilian" (野, no); and her first name translates as "Asia" or "second" (亜, a) and "beauty" (美, mi). It is structured as a pun, as the syllable "no" indicates a possessive, so that her name can also be understood as "Beauty of Water." It is frequently mistranslated as "Friend of Water" because of the French word ami, which is included in some Japanese dictionaries.

=== Actresses ===
In the original anime production of Sailor Moon, Ami was voiced by veteran voice actress Aya Hisakawa. After the show's conclusion, Hisakawa wrote in an artbook that she was "raised by" the character of Ami, and was "really, greatly happy" to have met her.

In the Sailor Moon Crystal anime, Ami is voiced by Hisako Kanemoto.

In the DIC/Cloverway English adaptation, Ami's name is changed to "Amy". Her voice was provided first by Karen Bernstein, for the original and R series and the movies, and later by Liza Balkan for the S and SuperS series. In the Viz Media English dub Ami's voice is supplied by Kate Higgins.

Ami has been portrayed by 18 actresses in the stage musicals: Ayako Morino, Yukiko Miyagawa, Hisano Akamine, Mariya Izawa, Chieko Kawabe, Manami Wakayama, Miyabi Matsura, Momoyo Koyama, Yume Takeuchi, Riria Itou, Miria Watanabe, Cocona, Umino Kawamura, Momoko Kaechi, Hazuki Mukai, Kanon Maekawa, Aya Ogawa, and Aruno Nakanishi.

In Pretty Guardian Sailor Moon, she is played by Rika Izumi. Child actress Kanki Matsumoto portrays Ami in flashback sequences and childhood photographs.

== Reception and influence ==
The official Sailor Moon character popularity polls listed Ami Mizuno and Sailor Mercury as separate entities. In 1992, readers ranked them at seventh and fourth respectively, out of thirty eight choices. One year later, now with fifty choices, Ami was the eighth most popular while Mercury was ninth. In 1994, with fifty one choices, Ami was the fifteenth most popular character, and Mercury was sixteenth. In early 1996, with fifty one choices, Ami was again the fifteenth most popular character, and Mercury was the nineteenth. Ami was the most popular female character in Animage's May 1993 poll, and an episode featuring her, "Love for Ami?! A Boy Who Can Predict the Future", was the eleventh favorite episode. The following year she came second behind Belldandy, and in 1995 she came fifth. In 1995, an episode featuring Ami, "The Labyrinth of Water! Ami the Targeted", was the ninth favorite episode. In 1996, after the debut of Neon Genesis Evangelion, she came sixteenth, and in 1997 she came twentieth.

A five-book series was published, one book on each of the Sailor Soldiers and Sailor Moon. Ami's was released in 1996. This book was later translated into English by Mixx. The episode where Sailor Mercury gained her powers was novelized by Mixx.

She was popular with the male audience of Pretty Soldier Sailor Moon due to her computer use and skills. Writer Tamaki Saito reported that Ami Mizuno has been interpreted as "the prototype" of Rei Ayanami from Neon Genesis Evangelion.

and cgi model version of her was feature in Lil Uzi Vert's Futsal Shuffle 2020 music video where she was dancing.

== See also ==
- Mercury in fiction
- Mercury (mythology)
- Elsa (Frozen)
- Enki
