= Chieko Ochi =

Japanese singer, model and actress (born 1987)

Chieko Kawabe 河邉 千恵子
- Also known as: Chieko Ochi (越智千恵子)
- Born: Chieko Kawabe (河辺千恵子); February 24, 1987 (age 39); Tokyo, Japan
- Genres: J-pop; anison
- Occupations: Singer; model; actress
- Years active: 1998–present
- Spouses: Masato Ochi (m. 2008; div. 2015); Unknown (m. 2020)
- Website: ameblo.jp/chieko-0224/

Chieko Kawabe (河邉 千恵子, Kawabe Chieko), born February 24, 1987, in Tokyo, is a Japanese singer, model and actress. She played Sailor Mercury in the Sailor Moon musicals and was Naru Osaka in the live action adaptation of Sailor Moon.

Several of her songs have been used in anime series and other television shows, from a localization of Lizzie McGuire to Ouran High School Host Club.

== Biography ==
She was born to a Japanese father and Filipina mother.

== Career ==
Kawabe was involved in the Sailor Moon Musicals in 2000 when she was 12. She played Sailor Mercury and participated in five productions including the 10th anniversary special in 2002. She made guest appearances at Fan Kansha and released a DVD called Sera Myu. Afterwards, she handed her Sailor Mercury role to Wakayama Manami, but got involved in the live-action Sailor Moon drama as Naru Osaka in 2003.

Kawabe released the single "Be Your Girl" on April 27, 2004. This became the ending theme song to the anime Elfen Lied, and her other song, "Hoshi ni Negai wo" was the end theme song to Otogizoshi. She released "Shining" in 2004, and "Kizunairo" in 2005. The song "I Can't Wait", from the "Kizunairo" single was used as the theme song to the Japanese version of the show Lizzie McGuire. She released her first album, Brilliance in March 2005, and the single "Candy Baby" in July. Kawabe's next major single was "Sakura Kiss" which was the theme song for the anime Ouran High School Host Club. The single charted in Oricon, peaking at 71.

In addition to acting and singing, she has worked as a model, appearing in publications such as Tokuma Shoten's Love Berry magazine. She hosted a weekly show in Harajuku.

Since April 2016, she currently works as a certified Pilates instructor.

== Personal life ==
Kawabe married producer Masato Ochi on August 8, 2008, who was twenty one years her senior. After her marriage she started using the name Chieko Ochi (越智 千恵子, Ochi Chieko) during that time they were married in both public and personal activities. She gave birth to her first child, a daughter, on May 21, 2010. After seven years of marriage, the couple amicably divorced in 2015. Kawabe's ex-husband has custody of their daughter.

Shortly after divorcing, she went back to using her maiden last name, but with different characters.

In November 2020, she announced on her blog the registration of her second marriage to a chiropractor 5 years older after meeting in one of Kawabe's Pilates lessons. They celebrated their wedding in June 2021 at her husband's hometown in Hokkaido. On June 1, 2022, she gave birth to her second daughter. And on December 11, 2024, she gave birth to her third child, a son.

== Discography ==
=== Albums ===
List of albums, with selected chart positions
| Title | Album information | Oricon |
| Title | Album information | Peak position |
|---|---|---|
| Brilliance | Released: March 16, 2005; Catalog No.: VPCC-80602 | |

=== Singles ===
List of singles, with selected chart positions
| Title | Album information | Oricon | Album |
| Title | Album information | Peak position | Album |
|---|---|---|---|
| "Be Your Girl" | Released: April 28, 2004; Catalog No.: VPCC-82176 | 67 | Brilliance |
| "Shining!"/"cry baby" | Released: November 24, 2004; Catalog No.: VPCC-82189 | 157 | Brilliance |
| "Kizunairo" (絆色) | Released: January 26, 2005; Catalog No.: VPCC-82191 | 150 | Brilliance |
| "Candy Baby" / "Mama Made" (キャンディーベイベー/マーマメード) | Released: July 21, 2005; Catalog No.: VPCC-82199 | | |
| "Sakura Kiss" (桜キッス) | Released: April 26, 2006; Catalog No.: VPCC-82601 | 71 | |
