= Dark Kingdom =

Group of fictional antagonists in the Sailor Moon franchise

- The Dark Kingdom as depicted in the original anime adaptation. Left column: Jadeite, Nephrite. Middle column: Queen Metaria (background), Queen Beryl. Right column: Kunzite, Zoisite.

Publication information
- Publisher: Kodansha
- First appearance: Sailor Moon chapter #1: "Usagi – Sailor Moon" (December 1991)
- Created by: Naoko Takeuchi

In-story information
- Base(s): D-Point (North Pole)
- Leader(s): Queen Beryl; Queen Metaria
- Member(s): Four Kings of Heaven; Endou; Dark Mercury; Mio Kuroki; Dark Agency; Monsters

The Dark Kingdom (Japanese: ダーク・キングダム, Hepburn: Dāku Kingudamu) is a group of fictional characters in the Sailor Moon manga series by Naoko Takeuchi. They are the chief villains of the first story arc in every version of the series, and were first introduced in the first chapter of the manga, "Usagi – Sailor Moon", originally published in Japan's Nakayoshi on 28 December 1991. In the DIC English adaptation, the Dark Kingdom's title was changed to "Negaverse".

In each variation of the series, the characters—led by Queen Beryl—attempt to steal life energy from humans and the Silver Crystal so they can release the evil Queen Metaria, who was imprisoned by Queen Serenity during the destruction of the Moon Kingdom during the Silver Millennium period.

== Creation and conception ==
The Dark Kingdom is first referenced in Naoko Takeuchi's Codename: Sailor V, which features Sailor Venus as the main character, who confronts a group of villains called the Dark Agency. In the final volume of Codename: Sailor V, the Dark Agency is revealed to be a subset of the Dark Kingdom, which leads to the beginning of Sailor Moon. Takeuchi developed the Sailor Moon series and the Dark Kingdom when Codename: Sailor V was first proposed for an anime adaptation. The idea was ultimately dropped, but Sailor Venus became part of a new group alongside Sailors Moon, Mercury, Mars, and Jupiter, and instead of fighting the Dark Agency, they fought the Dark Kingdom.

The names of Queen Beryl and the Four Kings of Heaven are derived from minerals: beryl, jadeite, nephrite, zoisite, and kunzite. (Note: In Act 11, when the brainwashed Endymion meets Reika Nishimura, he identifies the four gemstones in her book.) In some English adaptations, Kunzite's name is changed to Malachite. Several villains from subsequent arcs follow this pattern of using minerals as namesakes. The Four Kings of Heaven is speculated to be based on the Buddhist gods, The Four Heavenly Kings.

In the DIC Entertainment English adaptation, the Dark Kingdom's name is changed to the "Negaverse", a portmanteau of negative and universe. Beryl and her cohorts use "nega" as a prefix to show their devotion to wickedness and to underscore their dimension's inherent negativity—e.g. "negapower" and "negahistory".

== Key figures ==
=== Queen Beryl ===
Queen Beryl (クイン・ベリル, Kuin Beriru), named after the mineral beryl, is the first main antagonist in the Sailor Moon series. Beryl has immense magical power and uses it to channel the life energy harvested by her servants into the entity Queen Metaria. In most versions of the story, Beryl has the ability to corrupt others into her service. (Note: In the manga, it is revealed that the Four Kings of Heaven were once the bodyguards of Prince Endymion, and in most versions of the story, Beryl is able to use her powers to sway Endymion himself into her service.)

Before the events of Sailor Moon, Beryl is a young girl on Earth during the age of the Silver Millennium. Beryl is in love with Prince Endymion, but her love is unrequited. After discovering Endymion's relationship with Princess Serenity, she sides with Queen Metaria and is corrupted. Beryl mobilizes the Earth in a war against the Moon Kingdom, killing Endymion while he is protecting Serenity, leading to the princess' own suicide. Though killed by Sailor Venus with the Holy Moon Sword, Beryl is reborn in the 20th century, regaining the memories of her past life upon finding Queen Metaria while traveling to D-Point in the Arctic. She becomes Queen of the Dark Kingdom, communicating with Metaria while recruiting her reincarnated generals Jadeite, Nephrite, Zoisite, and Kunzite, to find the Silver Crystal. Beryl is able to summon the reincarnated Prince Endymion, Mamoru Chiba, to her side, as a lifeless thrall after he dies and is revived with a fragment of the Silver Crystal inside him. Beryl fails in her attempt to get the Silver Crystal and is killed by Sailor Venus with the Holy Moon Sword.

In the original anime adaptation, Beryl attacks Tokyo while Usagi Tsukino and the other Sailor Guardians are searching for the Moon Princess. She also kidnaps and brainwashes Mamoru to love her and to kill Usagi. But he breaks free of her control and fatally wounds Beryl. Having lost everything, Beryl begs Metaria for more power which results in Metaria possessing Beryl's body, transforming her into an enhanced appearance. Usagi confronts the Beryl/Metaria being as Princess Serenity and a battle ensues in which Usagi obliterates Beryl along with Metaria, destroying the two for good.

In the live-action series, Jadeite and Nephrite are rivals for her affections; Zoisite is more loyal to Endymion than to her, and Kunzite sets his sights on taking Metaria's power for himself. At one point, Beryl creates a shadow of herself, Mio Kuroki, who sets out to ruin Usagi's reputation while being Beryl's eyes and ears. When she learns that Mamoru Chiba was Prince Endymion, Beryl forces him to come with her by showing him that she can easily kill the Four Kings of Heaven with Nephrite as an example. Once she has the object of her desire under her services, Beryl has Jadeite implant an item in Mamoru's body that will shorten his life when he is with Usagi. However, Mamoru still risks his life for Usagi and Beryl loses control over Metaria's actions due to the overuse of the Silver Crystal. She is killed when her castle crumbles under the stress of a distraught Princess using the Silver Crystal to destroy Earth. However, for all her sadness, she is not alone as Jadeite stays by her side after she removes her mind-control spell on him, saying that Beryl is his master by choice.

In Sailor Moon Crystal, Beryl's role in the reboot is the same as the manga. Unlike the manga, Beryl's demise was altered to have her necklace that maintained her existence shattered by the Holy Moon Sword wielded by Sailor Moon.

Beryl appears in the first musical, Gaiden Dark Kingdom Fukkatsu Hen, and its revision, in a similar plot to the series' first story arc. She is then revived in the semi-original musical Eien Densetsu and its revision by Sailor Galaxia, who merely uses her as a puppet to awaken Sailor Saturn. Beryl dies while protecting Sailor Moon from a stab by the evil Tuxedo Mask mud puppet, her last statement being "This time I die for passion". Similarly, in Shin Densetsu Kourin, Beryl kills the evil King Endymion mud puppet to give Sailor Moon a fighting chance against Galaxia. Several times in the musical, Beryl and Sailor Pluto share the song Onna no Ronsou, which explains why betrayal by Endymion in the past killed Beryl's emotion of love. Each time this song is played, Sailor Pluto would always begin with "Because we are the same" or a similar phrase.

In the anime series, her voice actress is Keiko Han. During recording, this contrast resulted in occasional fits of giggles among the cast when Han would change from Luna's cute, catlike voice to the deep, evil tones of Beryl. Sometimes, she would accidentally play Beryl with Luna's voice. In Sailor Moon Crystal, she is voiced by Misa Watanabe. In the DIC English adaptation, she is voiced by Naz Edwards with Jill Frappier as a stand-in during a clip show in Sailor Moon R. In the Viz Media English adaptation, her voice is supplied by Cindy Robinson. In the stage musicals, Beryl has been played by two actresses: Yuri Nishina and Akiko Miyazawa (who previously played Sailor Venus). In the live-action series, she is portrayed by adult J-pop idol Aya Sugimoto.

=== Queen Metaria ===
Queen Metaria (クイン・メタリア, Kuin Metaria; called "the Negaforce" in the original English dub) is a malignant, amorphous energy being, and the true mastermind of the Dark Kingdom. She was born as a result of an abnormality in the Sun. Like all arch-villains in the Sailor Moon manga, she is an incarnation of the final arch-villain, Chaos. While the first official English release of the manga in English spelled her name as "Metalia", it was a translation error; reprints of the manga in English as well as multiple reprints in Japanese consistently depicted the character's name spelled as "Metaria" in Latin letters.

Being responsible for the fall of the Silver Millennium, Metaria used her power to corrupt the majority of Earth's population, including Beryl, whose affections towards Endymion were exploited into attacking the Moon Kingdom as Prince Endymion and Princess Serenity were to wed. The battle came to an end when Metaria was sealed away by Queen Serenity in the area of the North Pole known as D-Point. In the 20th century, Metaria summons a reborn Beryl back into her service to obtain the Silver Crystal and take its power as her own. After Endymion's reincarnated form is captured, Metaria turns the youth into a thrall to retrieve the then powerless Silver Crystal while sacrificing Beryl in the process. When Sailor Moon's attempted murder-suicide of Endymion restores the Silver Crystal, Metaria makes her move and absorbs the crystal while wiping out all life on Earth. But after Sailor Moon and Mamoru escape with the crystal thanks to the Sailor Guardians' sacrifice, the form eventually destroys Metaria by targeting the star mark on her forehead and then uses the Silver Crystal's power to restore everyone to life.

In the original anime adaptation, Metaria is much the same, with a few exceptions. She eventually becomes powerful enough to resurrect on her own and takes possession of the dying Beryl, transforming into a towering goddess-like creature who is eventually destroyed by Princess Serenity.

In the live-action series, Beryl originally intends to use the Silver Crystal to control Metaria, but later learns that the gem's power only makes Metaria stronger due to Usagi's rage being transmitted through it. This escalates to the point where Beryl can no longer control the actions of her own Monsters and fears that Metaria may destroy everything. Metaria later transfers her will into the strongest Monster in its service. In a vain attempt to stop Metaria, Endymion takes the creature into his own body with the intent of committing suicide in order to take it with him. Instead, Metaria takes control of Endymion and uses him in an attempt to force Sailor Moon to use the Silver Crystal's power. Metaria's plan succeeds, but only after Sailor Moon is forced to kill Endymion and Metaria with him. Sailor Moon revives Mamoru with the Silver Crystal's power, with Metaria gone for good.

In the anime series, her voice actresses are Noriko Uemura in the first series and Yōko Matsuoka in Sailor Moon Crystal. In the DIC English adaptation, she is voiced by Maria Vacratsis. In the Viz Media English adaptation, her voice is supplied by Mary Elizabeth McGlynn. In the live-action series, she possesses Mamoru, portrayed by Jouji Shibue.

== Four Kings of Heaven ==
The Four Kings of Heaven (四天王, Shitennō; lit. "Four Heavenly Kings", called "Negacommanders" in the original English dub) are the commanders of the Dark Kingdom working directly under Queen Beryl. They provide the major antagonistic force for the beginning of every version of the series.

Before the events of the series, the Four Kings of Heaven originally functioned as the four guardians of Earth's crown prince Endymion. They were led astray during the time of the Silver Millennium, selling their souls to the Dark Kingdom and becoming Beryl's servants. When reincarnated in the 20th century, they again fall prey to her and obey her every command, but retain a sense that they need to seek out their real master and aid him. The Sailor Guardians fight and kill the four of them, one at a time. However, they are all briefly revived near the end of the "Dark Kingdom" arc and are able to remember the Golden Kingdom and their time as Prince Endymion's guardians before being turned into the stone from which their names are derived. The stones are kept by Mamoru Chiba (Endymion's reincarnation in the present day) who uses them to call upon the spirits of the Four Kings of Heaven for advice on a situation.

In the original anime adaptation, the Four Kings of Heaven serve as Beryl's servants and have no connection to Mamoru. Once they are killed, the four only appear in flashbacks afterward. In the DIC English adaptation, the Four Kings of Heaven served as human-like beings from the Negaverse, an alternate dimension of evil, and had only a vague understanding of human ways.

The Four Kings of Heaven appeared in several musicals. In many of them, they are paired with the Sailor Guardians. In musical adaptations of the last arc, the Four Kings are revived by Sailor Galaxia to work under her service, but in some versions, they betray her. The musical Kakyuu-Ouhi Kourin had a group that which called themselves the Neo-Four Kings of Heaven (Neo-Shiten'ō). The members of the Neo-Four Kings of Heaven were Kunzite, Hematite, Hiddenite, and Kalunite. Hematite, Hiddenite, and Kalunite looked identical to Zoisite, Nephrite, and Jadeite respectively. In La Reconquista, the Four Kings of Heaven disguise themselves as a boy band known as Pandemic 4. The group consisted of Kunza, Jed, Nephra, and Zoi. The band appeared in the Pandemic Love game, in which they used the game to drain energy for Beryl, and had one song, Erosion Boy (イロージョンボーイ, Irōjon Bōi).

In the live-action series, their past becomes more frequently seen. In the Sailor Moon: Another Story video game, the Four Kings of Heaven appear as ghosts who help four of the Sailor Guardians get the respective gems of each of the Four Kings of Heaven when Mamoru ends up injured by the Opposito Guardians.

In Sailor Moon Crystal, the "Four Heavenly Kings" are kept alive beyond their deaths in the manga. They rediscover their past lives but are once again brainwashed by Beryl. During the final battle, Venus reveals that the Sailor Guardians and the Four Heavenly Kings were originally lovers much like Serenity and Endymion respectively. When the Sailor Guardians manage to reach the Four Kings during the former group's assault on D-Point, they regain their full memories before being obliterated by Queen Metaria for outliving their usefulness.

=== Jadeite ===
Jadeite (ジェダイト, Jedaito) is the first of the Four Kings of Heaven to appear. In her Materials Collection, Naoko Takeuchi describes him as 'a typical beautiful person' and a ruthless, serious type. He is about 18 years old in appearance, making him the second-youngest, while in the live-action series he is the youngest. He is the head of the Dark Kingdom's far-eastern division and is named after the mineral jadeite.

Jadeite's mission is to track down the Silver Crystal but eventually changes to gathering life energy to awaken Metaria. He has very little interaction with the other Four Kings of Heaven. He expresses an attraction to Sailor Mars and is the first one killed when Rei uses her Akuryo Taisan technique. After Jadeite's death, Nephrite vows to exact revenge as he preserves Jadeite's skeleton in a glass coffin. In the later side story Casablanca Memories, Zoisite also tries to avenge Jadeite.

In the original anime adaptation, hunting energy is Jadeite's primary mission. He uses the alias "J. Dite" during his missions and has his Monsters pose as different people. After Jadeite fails numerous times and at one point costing Beryl the life of Thetis, one of her top Monsters, Beryl gives Jadeite one final chance to destroy the Sailor Guardians and threatens him with Eternal Sleep should he fail. Upon Jadeite's failure, Beryl fulfills her promise and condemns him to Eternal Sleep by freezing him in a large crystal. She then warns everyone present to let Jadeite's fate be a warning to all of them before appointing Nephrite to be the monsters' new commander.

In the live-action series, Jadeite is totally subservient to Beryl, for which she rewards him with her favor, sending him on missions that range from gathering energy to spying on his fellow warriors to attacking the Sailor Guardians directly. He disappears early in the series, reverting to crystalline form due to an injury from one of his battles, but is revived by Metaria. Firmly loyal to Beryl, he rejects Endymion as his true master until the series finale, where he stays with Beryl as the castle collapses around her.

In Sailor Moon Crystal, Jadeite survives the battle against Sailor Mars, but Beryl sends Nephrite to continue fulfilling their mission. In his past life, he was the love interest of Sailor Mars. Jadeite is killed by Metaria along with the other Kings of Heaven in Episode 12.

In the original Japanese series, he is voiced by Masaya Onosaka. In Crystal, he is voiced by Daisuke Kishio. In the DIC English adaptation, his name was changed to Jedite and he is voiced by Tony Daniels. In the Viz Media English adaptation, his voice is supplied by Todd Haberkorn. In the live-action series, he was portrayed by Jun Masuo and he was portrayed in the musicals by Susumu Futabashi and Yuhka Asami.

=== Nephrite ===
Nephrite (ネフライト, Nefuraito) is the second of the Four Kings of Heaven to appear. Takeuchi describes him as cocky and emotional, writing in her concept notes he will probably get himself killed right off. He is the second-oldest, estimated at 19 years old, and is in charge of the Dark Kingdom's North American division. He is named after the mineral nephrite.

Nephrite's primary goal is to locate the Silver Crystal, but he also takes vows to exact revenge for the death of Jadeite. He uses a female "shadow" of himself to attack his victims, simultaneously taking control over their bodies and draining their energy. Sailor Jupiter kills him with her Jupiter Thunderbolt technique before any harm is done.

In the original anime adaptation, Beryl appoints Nephrite to continue the energy-hunting job after placing Jadeite in Eternal Sleep. Nephrite hypothesizes to Beryl that more energy can be taken by concentrating on a single human. He achieves this by implanting the essence of each of his Monsters into a specific person's prized possession. Nephrite's only disguise is "Masato Sanjouin" (三条院正人, Sanjōin Masato), a wealthy businessman and socialite. Over the course of his missions, Nephrite inadvertently attracts the attention and affections of Usagi's best friend, Naru Osaka, which interferes with his progress. Nephrite siphons some energy from Naru for Beryl, enough to impress her. The Dark Crystal he crafts to detect the Silver Crystal reacts instead to Naru's love for him. Eventually, he comes to return her love and chooses to rescue her from Zoisite at the cost of his own life, as he is killed by the Plant Sisters.

In the live-action series, Nephrite is Jadeite's main rival for the attention of Beryl, who considers him useless. His physical appearance is drastically changed, and he is portrayed as hot-headed and violent. Repeatedly humiliated by the Sailor Guardians, and mocked by the other Kings of Heaven, he strives to win Beryl's favor, but she kills her as a demonstration of her power. He is then reborn in Tokyo as a normal human being with all his memories intact, getting a job at the karaoke parlor and forging a tenuous friendship with Ami Mizuno, who was compassionate toward him when she was Dark Mercury. At the end of the series, he is re-established with the other Kings of Heaven as one of Prince Endymion's guardians.

In Sailor Moon Crystal, Nephrite attempts to appeal to Beryl to take Jadeite's place only for Zoisite to intervene. Later, when his Soul Shadow is destroyed by Usagi, Nephrite rejoins the other Kings of Heaven to threaten the Sailor Guardians. He attempts to find the Silver Crystal by using a Monster who resembles a bride. However, he is attacked by Sailor Jupiter and is forced to flee. In his past life, he was the love interest of Sailor Jupiter. He is killed by Metaria along with the other Kings of Heaven.

In the Japanese series, he is voiced by Katsuji Mori in the first series and in Crystal by Kōsuke Toriumi. In the DIC English adaptation, his name was changed to "Nephlite" and his mortal alias to Maxfield Stanton, and he is voiced by Kevin Lund. In the Viz Media English adaptation, his voice is supplied by Liam O'Brien. In the live-action series he was portrayed by Hiroyuki Matsumoto, and was portrayed in the stage musicals by Toshikazu Seike and Karen Yoda.

=== Zoisite ===
Zoisite (ゾイサイト, Zoisaito) is the third of the Four Kings of Heaven. Of the four, his character has undergone the most drastic changes from version to version of the story. He is the youngest, at about 16–17 years of age, described by Takeuchi as the least mature and most effeminate. He manages the Dark Kingdom's European Division and is named after the mineral zoisite.

Zoisite first mocks Nephrite after Jadeite is killed, and then cries out in anguish after Nephrite is also killed. However, he also works closely with Kunzite, sharing concerns and strategies as he works. Seeking the Silver Crystal, he uses news reports and press releases to make the population of Tokyo help with his search, then resorts to taking their energy when they fail. He is killed by Sailor Venus's Crescent Boomerang.

In the original anime adaptation, Zoisite is Kunzite's lover. The DIC English adaptation of the anime changed Zoisite's gender to female in order to make his relationship with Kunzite more socially acceptable for the 1990s when very few homosexual couples were portrayed in the media. This censorship has led to a great amount of criticism since then, with some pointing out that the changes were made to force the series into a heteronormative perspective. He is introduced along with Nephrite, mocking him in each episode. At one point when Beryl spared Nephrite from Eternal Sleep due to bringing energy despite failing to take out Sailor Moon and Tuxedo Mask, she told Zoisite to remember his position and to focus on finding the Silver Crystal. (Note: The DIC dub had Beryl warning Zoisite that he would be joining Jadeite in Eternal Sleep if he questioned her judgement again.) Later, he orders her Monsters the Plant Sisters to kidnap Naru and kill Nephrite. The Plant Sisters succeeded in their mission. After Metaria's awakening, Beryl appoints Zoisite to find the Rainbow Crystals, fragments of the Silver Crystal sealed within the "Seven Great Monsters". He obtains the seven crystals from the hosts of the Seven Great Monsters. Mamoru saves Usagi from certain death by intercepting Zoisite's attack. The two are then revealed to be Princess Serenity and Prince Endymion. Infuriated that Zoisite has injured Endymion, Beryl uses an attack from her scepter to fatally wound Zoisite who later dies in Kunzite's arms.

In the live-action series, Zoisite is a pianist, using magical songs to hunt for the hidden Moon Princess. In addition to his own "Requiem for a Princess", he plays such compositions as the "Fantaisie-Impromptu" and the "Moonlight Sonata". He cares very little for Beryl and comes to recognize Prince Endymion as his master long before the others. After being killed by Sailor Venus and later revived by the power of Metaria, he ignores Beryl and uses his music to attempt to reach out to Endymion and to restore the memories of their collective past life to his fellow Kings of Heaven. His loyalty to Endymion is such that he offers his own life in exchange for the Prince's, and when Beryl asks for Usagi's life instead, Zoisite sets out to kill her. Diverted from this course of action by Endymion, he dies protecting Sailor Moon instead.

In Sailor Moon Crystal, Zoisite is wounded by Usagi's Moon Healing Escalation technique. However, Beryl nurses him back to health. He attempts to kill both Mamoru and Usagi, only for Minako and Artemis to seriously wound him again and cause him to flee. In his past life, Zoisite was the love interest of Sailor Mercury. He is killed by Metaria along with the other Kings of Heaven in Episode 12.

In the original anime series, Zoisite is voiced by Keiichi Nanba, with Masaya Matsukaze taking over the role for Crystal. In the DIC English adaptation, his name is spelled as Zoycite, and he is voiced by Kirsten Bishop as part of being depicted as a female character. In the Viz Media English adaptation, his name is spelled as Zoisite and his voice is supplied by Lucien Dodge. In the live-action series, he is portrayed by Yoshito Endou. In the musicals, he is portrayed by Toshitaka Akita, Misao Idono, Akira Tomemori, and Kaname Aoki.

=== Kunzite ===
Kunzite (クンツァイト, Kuntsaito) is the fourth and final member of the Four Kings of Heaven. He carries a shortsword, and Takeuchi describes him as having the majesty of an Arabian king. He is the oldest, at about 25–26 years old, leads the Dark Kingdom's Mid-Eastern division, and is named after the mineral kunzite. Unlike the others, he wears a white cape in addition to his uniform, with his tunic partially opened.

Before the beginning of the series, Kunzite is a military officer of Prince Endymion before joining Beryl and dying in the battle against the Silver Millennium. He is then revived by Beryl. Introduced as Zoisite's advisor, Kunzite becomes Beryl's henchman after the death of the other Kings of Heaven. He defeats the Sailor Guardians at Tokyo Tower and nearly kills Usagi, but Mamoru takes the injury for her, and they are revealed to be Princess Serenity and Prince Endymion. Remembering that Endymion is his former master, Kunzite becomes uncertain about his loyalties, causing Beryl to plant a crystal in his forehead that reduces him to little more than a mindless slave. During that time, Kunzite tells Mamoru where Metaria's weakness is.

In the original anime adaptation, Kunzite and Zoisite are allies as well as lovers. After Metaria's reawakening, Kunzite assists Zoisite in obtaining the Rainbow Crystals. After losing the Rainbow Crystals, Kunzite is spared when Zoisite is killed at the hands of Beryl for harming Prince Endymion. She forewarns Kunzite to let what happened to Zoisite serve as a warning to him should he harm Endymion. Zoisite dies in Kunzite's arms. He resents being forced to work with the brainwashed Endymion because he feels he is responsible for Zoisite's death and because of Beryl favoring him. Following Zoisite's death, Kunzite plans to exact revenge on the Sailor Guardians and turns humans into Monsters to help him. Eventually, he captures all of the Sailor Guardians except for Sailor Moon. Kunzite is killed when Usagi reflects his own energy blade back at him as he tells Zoisite to wait for him on the other side.

In the live-action series, Kunzite is first introduced in the form of an amnesiac man named Shin, whom Usagi attempts to befriend. His memories are restored by Beryl, causing him to be a ruthless and powerful warrior. His efforts to reawaken Metaria are largely motivated by a desire for personal gain, and he is dismissive to Beryl, sometimes to the point of insubordination. He mostly works with her toward their shared goals, and he also transforms Sailor Mercury into Dark Mercury. Kunzite is awakened early on to the memory that Endymion was his master in his previous life, but he feels extreme contempt for the prince, believing he betrayed the Four Kings of Heaven in ages past and left them for dead. Eventually, at the cost of his life, he saves Endymion from an attack by Jadeite and professes his loyalty to the prince.

In Sailor Moon Crystal, Kunzite turns off Tokyo's power to provoke Minako into attacking him. However, he flees with Mamoru and is rejoined by the other Four Kings of Heaven. In his past life, he was the love interest of Sailor Venus, a fact which Venus desperately tries to remind him of each time they face off. In his last moment prior to being killed by Metaria along with the other Kings of Heaven, he manages to briefly acknowledge that he returns Venus's love.

In the original Japanese series, he is voiced by Kazuyuki Sogabe until episode 44 of Sailor Moon, and by Eiji Takemoto in all media following Sailor Moon Crystal. In the DIC English adaptation, his name was changed to "Malachite" and he is voiced by Denis Akiyama with John Stocker as a stand-in during a clip show in Sailor Moon R. In the Viz Media English adaptation, his voice is supplied by Patrick Seitz. In the live-action series, he is portrayed by Akira Kubodera. Kunzite was portrayed in the stage musicals by Yūta Mochizuki, Ryuji Kasahara, Hideka Asano, and Miki Kawasaki.

== Servants ==
=== Prince Endymion ===
In the manga, the original anime adaptation, and Sailor Moon Crystal, Beryl discovers that Mamoru Chiba is the reincarnated Prince Endymion after being revived by a fragment of the Silver Crystal that entered his body. Beryl uses her magic to turn him into a thrall of the Dark Kingdom and has him assume the identity of Endou to aid her in her scheme to locate the Sailor Guardians' base and steal the Silver Crystal. Sailor Moon manages to break Beryl's hold over Mamoru in the final battle.

In the original anime series, Princess Serenity's tears turn into the Silver Crystal, which revives Endymion. He is kidnapped by Kunzite immediately afterwards and is brainwashed by Beryl's magic. He is instructed to work with Kunzite, but he still saves the Sailor Guardians from danger. When he is trapped by the attacks of Sailors Mercury and Jupiter and Sailor Moon attempts to heal him, Kunzite takes him back to D Point to have him be brainwashed further. He fights Sailor Moon in the season finale, but is deprogrammed when he touches an artifact he gave to Sailor Moon before his enthrallment. He dies saving her from Beryl, but is revived by Usagi's final wish.

In the live-action series, Endymion willingly takes Queen Metaria into his body in order to kill himself and finish her, but she takes control of his body until Sailor Moon kills him, defeating Metaria for good and reviving Endymion afterward.

=== Dark Mercury ===
In the live-action series, Kunzite attempts an experiment in which he turns one of the Sailor Guardians evil. In Act 20, he kidnaps Ami Mizuno, who at the time is the loneliest and most vulnerable member of the team, and exposes her to Queen Metaria's energies, changing her into an evil alter ego called Dark Mercury. A black motif is added to her uniform, and she uses "dark" powers and an icicle sword. Kunzite keeps her fairly close, being careful to withdraw her whenever Sailor Moon attempts healing but takes advantage of her newly-sadistic personality by allowing her to attend school and antagonize Usagi. While a part of the Dark Kingdom, Mercury is as arrogant as her allies but extends a small amount of kindness to Nephrite. In the end, Dark Mercury almost kills Sailor Moon, but the knowledge that she has injured her friend reverts Ami back to her true form.

=== Mio Kuroki ===
Mio Kuroki (黒木ミオ, Kuroki Mio) is a minor villain appearing only in the live-action series. On the outside, she was a new teen idol whose signature song "Change of Pace" had a following comparable to that of Minako Aino's "C'est la Vie." Also like Minako, she was good at volleyball and claimed to be a good friend of Usagi's. The truth, however, was much more sinister. Mio was a "shadow" of Beryl, created by her and Jadeite sometime between Act 25 and Act 28. Her objectives in life were to be Beryl's eyes and ears in the human world, to give Mamoru Chiba to Beryl, and to generally make the lives of the Sailor Guardians as miserable as possible—especially Usagi's. Mio was the principal player in getting Mamoru Chiba into Beryl's grasp; she also generally watched Mamoru during his time in the Dark Kingdom and mocked him and Rei about the fact that Princess Serenity will use her powers to destroy everything again. However, Mio's treatment of Mamoru inadvertently came back to haunt her when Prince Endymion was possessed by Queen Metaria, who seemingly blasted her out of existence.

However, it turned out that the attack did not completely destroy her, and it took her four years to completely recover without Beryl's power to help her. She returned in the Special Act and attempted to recreate the Dark Kingdom. with her as its queen and Mamoru as the king. After realizing that Mamoru would always love Usagi even when brainwashed, she transformed into her true form: a terrifying, giant black flower with sharp vines. She was finally destroyed when the Sailor Guardians, sans Mars (whom she had managed to incapacitate earlier on) performed Sailor Planet Attack.

She was played by Alisa Yuriko Durbrow.

=== Dark Agency ===
In Codename: Sailor V, Minako Aino faces off with the Dark Agency, a group of villains posing as a talent and idol agency. The Dark Agency manipulated idols into helping them gather energy for the Dark Kingdom. In the final volume of the manga, it is revealed that the Dark Agency was established by the Dark Kingdom. Their leader is Danburite (ダンブライト, Danburaito), named after the mineral of the same name, whose real identity is Minako's love interest Phantom Ace. After Sailor V defeats him, the group dissolves and the Dark Kingdom begins to act directly, thus leading into the Sailor Moon series. They are never mentioned in the Sailor Moon manga or other continuities.

== Monsters ==
The Monsters (妖魔, Yōma) are the Dark Kingdom's army of minions in every version of the series, serving as the villain of the week in every adaptation. In the manga, only Jadeite and Nephrite use monsters to assist them in their missions. In Sailor Moon Crystal which follows the manga more closely than its predecessor, one more monster appears as the mannequin bride (a disguise that Nephrite himself uses in the manga).

In the original anime adaptation, Jadeite, Nephrite, and some of Zoisite's minions are real monsters, with Jadeite's monsters taking the form of human characters (such as Morga impersonating Naru Osaka's mother in every adaption) and Nephrite's monsters having their essence implanted in a person's object and emerging once the human victim had exceed their energy output. These monsters are killed either by Sailor Moon using "Moon Tiara Action" or by other Sailor Guardians' attacks at the end of each episode. Halfway through the season, Zoisite's arc introduces the "Seven Great Monsters" (最強妖魔七人衆, Saikyou Yōma Shichininshuu), the Dark Kingdom's most powerful monsters, reincarnated in the series' current timeline as six normal human beings and one cat, whose bodies contain the fragments of the Silver Crystal known as the seven Rainbow Crystals (虹水晶, Nijizuishou). Zoisite uses Nephrite's Dark Crystal to transform the humans and the cat into the Seven Great Monsters. After this story arc, Kunzite also uses the crystal to transform random human characters into monsters to attack the Sailor Guardians. Monsters created from humans are returned to their human form by Sailor Moon using "Moon Healing Escalation" which restores the human while destroying the monster. In the penultimate episode of the season, Beryl sends the DD Girls (ディーディー・ガールズ, Dī Dī Gāruzu), a group of five high-ranking monsters, to dispose of the Sailor Guardians, who destroy the DD Girls at the cost of their lives, ensuring that Sailor Moon reaches Beryl. In the DIC English adaptation, the Negaverse refers to the monsters as their "servants", while the Sailor Guardians and Tuxedo Mask call them "monsters" or sometimes "Negamonsters".

In the live-action series, the monsters serve much the same purpose as in the original anime adaptation. The monsters are portrayed by human actors in suits while two of them are computer-generated. They never speak, are never named, and are commanded by the Four Kings of Heaven. Swarms of monsters with black hooded robes (Note: The black hooded robed monsters are recycled versions of the Golem Soldiers/Putty Patrollers from Kyōryū Sentai Zyuranger/Mighty Morphin Power Rangers.) begin to appear after Sailor Moon is revealed to be the Princess. These hooded-robed monsters are loyal to Metaria rather than Beryl and the Four Heavenly Kings and their abilities as Metaria's foot soldiers include earth-swimming and fast movement. In Act 41, the remains of some of these hooded-robed monsters merge into a single, extremely strong monster. In Act 45, Queen Metaria turns the monster into her host in order to absorb every bit of energy in the world. However, Metaria is soon forced by Sailor Venus to leave her host, which is then destroyed by a group attack. This monster was capable of speech when Metaria was using it as a host. In the special act Mio Kuroki, under the alias of "Queen Mio", summons a group of clown-like monsters called Pierrot.

In the musicals Gaiden Dark Kingdom Fukkatsu Hen and its revision, a new monster called Manegin (マネギン) is introduced. This monster disguises herself as Haruna Sakurada and acts as leader of other minor monsters. Manegin is portrayed by Kasumi Hyūga in the original musical and by Kiho Seishi in the revision. Three DD Girls appear in the first musical, Gaiden Dark Kingdom Fukkatsu Hen, played by Hisako Doubayashi, Yuko Nishi, and Mayumi Maikuma, and in its revision, played by Yuriko Nishiyama, Kaori Ishikawa, and Ai Suzuki. In La Reconquista, monsters are replaced by Lemures; however, despite their name, they are not related to the minions of the Dead Moon Circus. The leader of these Lemures is Lemures Baba (レムレスバーバー, Remuresu Baba), who acts under Beryl's direct command. The other Lemures are unnamed. In one scene, the Lemures organize a Game Show. Baba was portrayed by Mayumi Shintani, while the other unnamed Lemures were played by Ayumi Shimozono, Asuka Yoshidome, Kumiko Saitou, Shiho Tsukagoshi, Moka Kodama, and Miki Shirai.

In the video games, several monsters from the anime make appearances as common enemies while some of the Seven Great Monsters appear as bosses. The DD Girls appear in the Another Story video game, where they are a reincarnated Beryl's last line of defense. They also appear as bosses in other video games. Naoko Takeuchi herself designed some new monsters for the Super Famicom video game, named HiraHira, MuchiMuchi, and GoroGoro. Manegin from the musicals also appears in other video games.

== Reception ==
When analyzing the contrast between young heroines and evil older women in manga, Kathryn Hemmann noted that "Queen Beryl is in no way girlish" and that, while the Sailor Guardians have enormous eyes, Beryl's "are narrow and shaded." Mie Hiramoto also established a contrast between Beryl and the Sailor Guardians in an analysis of anime and intertextualities, explaining that while the Guardians use Japanese women's language, Beryl uses the more formal Standard Japanese more frequently than any other character, which is typical of villains in other anime series. The inclusion of Beryl as an evil character in a line of dolls for girls has been described as a "radical idea". While reviewing shinto, feminism and anime, author Sarah Reeves considered that Beryl's overall misconduct and strategies are the result of a lack of husband and children.

Author Patrick Drazen described DIC's name change for Nephrite's disguise, Maxfield Stanton, as "ridiculously soap-opera". However, Drazen later made a later review about Nephrite's death at the hands of Zoisite's monsters and stated that this scene must have been an unexpected development for viewers used to happy endings. Drazen also cited Nephrite's death in Naru's arms as a scene of redemption, saying that him smiling and laughing during his death "would have been beyond him in the past, but love is turning him human." Kotono Mitsuishi, the voice actress of Usagi Tsukino, said she was particularly touched by this sequence.

Sara Roncero-Menendez from The Huffington Post stated that the homosexual relationship between Zoisite and Kunzite in the original anime adaptation was censored in the English versions by changing Zoisite's gender from male to female. In her response to an academic essay on Sailor Moon by Mary Grigsby, author Emily Ravenwood compared Zoisite and Kunzite's relationship with that of Sailor Neptune and Sailor Uranus' explaining that "in both cases, the feminine and masculine attributes are highlighted with a heavy hand (deliberate display of stereotypes)." According to her, Kunzite and Sailor Uranus are stoic and show no emotions, with Kunzite being hyper masculinized despite the long hair; while Zoisite "is the perfect limp-wristed gay boy." In her review of the DVD+Blu-ray combo pack of the English dub for Anime News Network, writer Rebecca Silverman compared Zoisite and Kunzite to Jadeite and Nephrite, stating that the former are better strategists than the latter. In this version, Zoisite's dub is male, and Silverman described voice actor Lucien Dodge's job as "convincingly androgynous, sounding more masculine when the character is angry, which works well." In his review of season one episode "Loved and Chased! Luna's Worst Day Ever", Michael Mammano from Den of Geek described Zoisite as "perfect", even with his flaws which are "always consistent and in character". The author went on by saying that Zoisite was, up to that point of the series, the most efficient of the Four Kings of Heaven, "but also the only one of them to be genuinely suited to comedy when the situation calls for it."

IGN writer Meghan Sullivan reviewed most of the episodes of Sailor Moon Crystal, and compared the original anime adaptation's DIC dub to the translation of Crystal, stating "the new translation makes (Beryl's) motivation for gathering human energy much more clear, which in turn makes her look much more dangerous." However, she considered that Jadeite still looks weak in Crystal, due to the failure of his monsters. Regarding Jadeite's demise, Sullivan hoped the writers devoted more time on the confrontation against him instead of the Sailor Guardians tracking him down, since he was supposed to be a formidable opponent. In the review of the next episode, the author described Nephrite as "a more formidable opponent than his predecessor."

Regarding Beryl's flashback scenes in Act 7, Sullivan wrote that it "felt a little disjointed", since it did not fully explain what Beryl was doing in the North Pole and how she managed to open the portal that leads to the Dark Kingdom. Sullivan particularly enjoyed the battle between the Four Kings of Heaven and the four Sailor Guardians in Act 10, describing it as "intense." In contrast, the final showdown of these two groups in Act 12 left the author unsatisfied, since according to her most of the action happened off-screen, and finally describing their demise at Queen Metaria's hands as "frustrating." Sullivan liked the battle against Beryl more, and considered that "learning that she was in love with Endymion this whole time made her feel more like a person and less like a random super villain." The final battle against Metaria was labelled by the author as "everything a Sailor Moon fan could ask for," with the episode itself doing "a great job establishing just how powerful Metaria has become."

In 1993, Animage made a male anime character popularity poll, in which Zoisite was the tenth most popular, and Nephrite was the joint seventeenth, tying with a character from Zettai Muteki Raijin-Oh. IGN placed Queen Beryl at No. 90 on their list of the 100 greatest villains of all time, noting that "when the iconic theme song sings about 'fighting evil by moonlight,' that evil is none other than Beryl".
