= Narumi Tsunoda =

Japanese voice actress

Narumi Tsunoda (津野田 なるみ, Tsunoda Narumi, real name 角田 成美, born March 14, 1962, in Tokyo) is a Japanese voice actress who works for Honey Rush from August 2007. She worked for Arts Vision until 1998. She also worked for Mausu Promotion (formerly known as Ezaki Productions) from 1998 to June 2007.

== Notable voice roles ==
- Rei Ijuuin in Tokimeki Memorial
- Sailor Star Maker/Kou Taiki in Sailor Moon Sailor Stars
- Natsu Ayuhara in Rival Schools
- Venat in Final Fantasy XII
- Kuriyo Urima/Riyo Urimaku in Crayon Shin-chan

=== Tokusatsu ===
- AP717 in B-Robo Kabutack, B-Robo Kabutack: The Epic Christmas Battle
- Medoumedou (ep. 2, 23 - 24) in Seijuu Sentai Gingaman

=== Dubbing ===
- Officer Jane in Die Hard with a Vengeance (Fuji TV edition)
