= Sailor Starlights =

Fictional characters in Sailor Moon

- The Sailor Starlights as drawn by Naoko Takeuchi. From top to bottom: Sailor Star Maker, Sailor Star Healer, Sailor Star Fighter.

Publication information
- Publisher: Kodansha
- First appearance: Sailor Moon chapter #43: Stars 1 (March 1996)
- Created by: Naoko Takeuchi

In-story information
- Base(s): Planet Kinmoku (formerly)
- Leader(s): Princess Kakyuu
- Member(s): Sailor Star Fighter; Sailor Star Maker; Sailor Star Healer

The Sailor Starlights (Japanese: セーラースターライツ, Hepburn: Sērā Sutāraitsu) are a group of fictional characters in the Sailor Moon manga series created by Naoko Takeuchi. They are introduced in the fifth and last arc of the series, called Stars in the manga, Sailor Moon Sailor Stars in the original anime adaptation, and Sailor Moon Cosmos in the second anime adaptation. The Starlights debut in chapter #43 "Stars 1", originally published in Japan's Nakayoshi magazine on March 28, 1996.

The group itself is composed of Sailor Star Fighter, Sailor Star Maker, and Sailor Star Healer; when in civilian form they go by the pseudonyms Kou Seiya, Kou Taiki, and Kou Yaten respectively. They are from the fictional planet Kinmoku, which has been destroyed, and disguise themselves as male idols, The Three Lights (スリーライツ, Surī Raitsu), in order to hide their true identities as they search for their lost princess, Kakyuu.

== Profiles ==
The Three Lights in their school uniforms as they appear in Sailor Moon Cosmos. From left to right: Kou Yaten, Kou Seiya, Kou Taiki.

The Starlights come from Kinmoku, a planet from another star system whose ruler, Princess Kakyuu, left to escape Sailor Galaxia's assault and heal her wounds. They tracked Kakyuu to Earth and then Japan, where they disguised themselves as the male pop star group The Three Lights and embedded their music with a telepathic broadcast to attract her attention. They attend Jūban High School along with Usagi Tsukino and her friends. Eventually, they manage to reunite with Kakyuu; however, while headed to the Galaxy Cauldron, Galaxia's henchwomen Sailor Chi and Sailor Phi kill them.

In the original anime adaptation, the Starlights were given a major role. On Earth, they physically change into males in their civilian forms and become women again when transforming into Sailor Guardians, as opposed to their manga counterparts, who disguise themselves as men as civilians. As Starlights, they distance themselves from the other Sailor Guardians, deeming that Earth is not their responsibility. They survive several direct battles with Galaxia herself, and help Sailor Moon defeat Chaos to save Galaxia.

The Starlights are featured in several of the Sailor Moon musicals (Sailor Stars, Eien Densetsu, and their revised editions, as well as Ryuusei Densetsu, Kakyuu-Ouhi Kourin and Le Mouvement Final). Despite being portrayed by women, it is meant to be ambiguous as to whether they take on male forms or cross-dress, though their personalities reflect the former. Their story also combines elements from both the manga and the anime; for instance, they travel to the Galaxy Cauldron as in the manga, but survive the battles against Galaxia as in the anime. The pairings with the Sailor Guardians from the anime are also featured in some musicals.

=== Sailor Star Fighter ===
Kou Seiya (星野 光, Seiya Kō), also known as Sailor Star Fighter (セーラースターファイター, Sērā Sutā Faitā), is the lead vocalist of the Three Lights. In general, Seiya acts arrogant and tends to be, at least on the surface, confident in her own abilities.

Seiya becomes the star player of their local high-school American football team and the school's star athlete, upsetting Haruka Tenoh, who was the previous star athlete on the track and field team. Eventually, Seiya raises the suspicions of the Sailor Guardians as to her identity. In the anime, Taiki and Yaten consider her to be prone to bouts of childishness, such as when she shows off her basketball skills before the school, but generally follow her lead.

Seiya develops strong feelings for Usagi, calling her odango, like Mamoru does, with Seiya's attempts to forge a bond with her providing the primary romantic tension of the season. The two go on a date at an amusement park, which is interrupted when Sailor Iron Mouse attacks. Seiya makes her interest in Usagi clear when they spend time together practicing softball, telling her, "I like your light." However, her feelings are not reciprocated and she acknowledges the one-sided romance.

The relationship between Sailor Star Fighter and Princess Kakyuu is slightly ambiguous. In the anime, when Seiya daydreams of the Starlights' home planet, she think of an image of Kakyuu, which is suddenly superimposed by an image of Usagi, much as Usagi had seen Seiya's image overlaid by Mamoru in previous episodes. In the image poem released for her CD single, however, she suggests that her feelings for Usagi are because she is "carrying the heart of a boy" and because she was attracted to Usagi's light.

In the band, she has the role of lead vocals, guitar and lyrics, but was also shown also playing the drums in the Starlights' hideout because she believed Kakyuu had not heard her yet. According to Takeuchi, when she created her, she was meant to be a combination between Haruka and Mamoru, and was modeled after Jenny Shimizu.

In Japanese, she was voiced by Shiho Niiyama in the original series in one of her final roles before her death and by Marina Inoue in Sailor Moon Cosmos. In English, she is voiced by Melissa Hutchison in the Viz dub. In the musicals, Seiya has been portrayed by Sayuri Katayama, Chinatsu Akiyama and Meiku Harukawa.

=== Sailor Star Maker ===
Kou Taiki (大気 光, Taiki Kō), also known as Sailor Star Maker (セーラースターメイカー, Sērā Sutā Meikā), is the most intellectual and cool-headed of the trio. Her abilities rival that of Ami, though she considers Ami's romantic notions foolish. However, in the anime, Ami's appeal for her to see the good in dreaming does begin to have an effect. In combat with a phage, Star Maker is the first of the Starlights to willingly allow Sailor Moon to heal the monster rather than trying to kill it herself, because it had been a teacher who Ami respected. Later in the series, as she is beginning to lose hope in finding Princess Kakyuu, she visits a sick girl named Misa in the hospital. She shows Taiki a drawing of the Princess that she sees when she listens to the Three Lights' song, giving Taiki renewed hope.

Like Yaten, Taiki believes that Seiya should stay away from Usagi after learning she is Sailor Moon, despite her wish, shared by Princess Kakyuu and the Sailor Guardians, for them to work together. However, her views on Usagi change for the better near the end of Sailor Stars.

In the band, she has the role of background vocals, keyboards and composition. She also enjoys poetry and are part of the literature club at school. Taiki is meant to be a more-distant Setsuna Meioh.

In Japanese, Taiki is voiced by Narumi Tsunoda in the original series and by Saori Hayami in Cosmos. In English, she is voiced by Erika Harlacher in the Viz dub. In the musicals, Taiki has been portrayed by Hikari Ono, Akiko Nakayama and Riona Tatemichi.

=== Sailor Star Healer ===
Kou Yaten (夜天 光, Yaten Kō), also known as Sailor Star Healer (セーラースターヒーラー, Sērā Sutā Hīrā), is a lonely person who does not like to socialize or interact with others, preferring to focus on her mission. Her remarks are often sharp-edged and blunt, which further separates her from others, which the other Starlights mock her for as it may reduce her fanbase. Yaten is egotistical and nurses grudges, and hates injury. However, she and Luna get along well.

Yaten has the most spiritual awareness of the three and is able to tell when Star Seeds are taken by Galaxia. She views humans as untrustworthy and want to find Kakyuu so the group can leave Earth as soon as possible. After learning that Usagi is Sailor Moon, Yaten believes that Seiya should stay away from her, despite her wish, shared by Princess Kakyuu and the Sailor Guardians, for them to work together, a view shared by Taiki and Sailors Uranus, Neptune and Pluto. However, like Taiki, her views on Usagi change for the better near the end of Sailor Stars. In the anime, Yaten is shown to be physically stronger than Makoto Kino in her civilian form, and bonds with her as they share moments together.

In the band, she has the role of background vocals, bass guitar and song arrangement. She also enjoys photography, but does not belong to any school club, preferring to just go home.

In Japanese, Yaten is voiced by Chika Sakamoto in the original series and by Ayane Sakura in Cosmos. In English, she is voiced by Sarah Anne Williams in the Viz dub. In the musicals, Yaten has been portrayed by Momoko Okuyama, Mikako Tabe and Saki Matsuda.

== Special powers and items ==
Kou Taiki's male body (in blue) transforming into Sailor Star Maker's female body (in pink), as seen in Sailor Moon Sailor Stars.

The Sailor Starlights share some traits with the Solar System Guardians, having transformation devices to change from civilians into their Sailor Guardian forms, as well as having signature attacks – although they do not represent proper elements like the Solar System Guardians do. Each member of the Three Lights use their own Sailor Change Star, which is a two-piece set of microphone and brooch, and respectively shout the phrase "Fighter/Maker/Healer Star Power, Make-Up!" to transform into Sailors Star Fighter, Star Maker, and Star Healer. Takeuchi explained in her own notes that the brooches contain their Sailor Crystals, which are perhaps their most important possessions, as they are source of all their powers. The original anime adaptation clearly shows how the Three Lights change from male bodies into female ones when transforming. As stated by Kakyuu, these male physical bodies are merely a disguise for the Starlights to work undercover during their mission to find her. Unlike most of the Sailor Guardians, whose transformation sequences went mostly unchanged from the first to the second anime adaptation, the Starlights' were completely altered to reflect the fact that the Three Lights remain female in their civilian forms, since Sailor Moon Cosmos follows the Stars arc of the manga closer than the Sailor Moon Sailor Stars season of the original anime.

In the original anime adaptation, each of the Starlights use an item called Star Yell (sometimes called the Sailor Star Yell), which are palm-sized star-shaped devices, to launch their attacks. Star Fighter's attack is Star Serious Laser – a focused light blast. Star Maker's attack is Star Gentle Uterus – an explosion of lights. Star Healer's attack is Star Sensitive Inferno – a circular blast of lightning. The only time the three Starlights combine their attacks occurs in the penultimate episode of the original anime adaptation, in which they join forces to launch a single attack on Sailor Galaxia, managing to physically injure her. In the musical Eien Densetsu, this attack is named Starlights Fusion Tempest, which is similar in name to Kakyuu's own Kinmoku Fusion Tempest.

== Development ==
Series creator Naoko Takeuchi originally designed the trio without their ponytails, but the ponytails were added after it was explained to her that short-haired dolls were difficult to make. Takeuchi designed a unified outfit for the three of them, using a set of navy blue breastplate, hot pants, and high heeled thigh-high boots. Only their necklaces, belts, and protector bracelets have different colors, which match their respective eye color: sky blue for Star Fighter, violet for Star Maker, and chartreuse for Star Healer. Takeuchi listed several attacks for each of the Starlights; however, only those she described as "main attacks" are featured in the series.

Takeuchi expressed surprise at Toei Animation's decision to make the Starlights lead characters in the original anime adaptation, but was even more shocked by their treatment of their sex. Rather than merely being females disguising as male pop idols as they do in the manga and other adaptations, the Three Lights were designed as physically male in the original anime adaptation, which contradicts Takeuchi's statement that only girls can be Sailor Guardians.

Their exact relationship to each other is unknown; according to the manga, they are not siblings. Their name "Kou" (光) has several meanings, including "light", making the name "Three Lights" a pun. In the original English manga, "Kou" was translated to "Lights" and was used as their shared family name.

== Reception and influence ==
According to Catherine E. Bailey of the Western Michigan University, when the Solar System Guardians learn the true identity of the Three Lights, "the collapse of the Lights' dual identities has more to do with social roles than sexual or gender identity. The fact that their secret is not met with disgust, disdain, or any other negative judgment indicates that Sailor Moon may have the potential to help normalise and un-sensationalise the presence of transgender and transsexual individuals." The author further explained she was hesitant to label the Starlights are "transgender" or "transsexual", although she acknowledges the anime "encourages viewers to look past the characters' physical bodies and to contemplate the fact that they are the same individuals regardless of the bodies that they occupy." In an article for the Interalia Journal of Queer Studies, Rhea Ashley Hoskin of the University of Waterloo explained that the Starlights' transformation sequences make them "weave between dichotomized boundaries of sex, gender and sexuality, essentially positioning these characters against notions of stable identity."

Madeline Hurren from Medium noted that, while the Starlights "clearly transform between male and female", other characters do not question this representation of diverse representation. The author also compared Sailor Moon to newer manga and anime, stating that "the show treats the nuances of gender identity and sexuality simply as one aspect of a multi-dimensional character. This, however, has changed. Modern anime increasingly treats non-binary identities as the sole focus of a character." Austin Jones from Paste described the trio as "genderfluid characters, given their distance from Western ideas of gender presentation as well as their unique ability." Diane Darcy from CBR considered that, in the original anime adaptation, "along with being able to transition between male and female bodies, all three Sailor Starlights also behave like boys in their civilian identities and like girls in their Sailor Guardian identities" thus becoming "an excellent trans and non-binary representation." In her review of the second half of Sailor Stars, Rebecca Silverman from Anime News Network pointed out the pronouns that the Starlights' voice actresses use in their interviews when discussing their characters, in which "Yaten's consistently uses they/them while Taiki's says she sees the characters as genderfluid." Silverman also cited some moments of "jerk behavior" from Taiki and Yaten, including a scene in which Taiki mistreats a sick girl in a hospital, another one in which the both of them intimidate Chibi-Chibi, and even the group's decision not to tell Usagi about Galaxia until episode 190.

In a review of Sailor Moon Cosmos, Darcy from CBR noted the difference in the portrayal of the Starlights, this time female in both Sailor Guardian and civilian forms, explaining that "by giving all three Sailor Starlights deeper voices, the characters' gender fluidity is more strongly conveyed and allows them to more convincingly pass for the male members of the boy band, Three Lights" while also praising the fact that "the Sailor Starlights' new voice actors do not aim to replicate the iconic performances" of the voice cast members of the original anime adaptation. Silverman from Anime News Network described the new transformation sequences of the Starlights in Cosmos as "very awkward".

=== Censorship ===
The Sailor Stars season of the original anime adaptation was not dubbed into English by DIC Entertainment and Cloverway Inc. Rodriguez-Garcia of The Michigan Daily explained that licensing issues were the main reason behind this event. However, other authors cite more reasons, the Starlights and their transformations being amongst them. Jamilya Ramos-Chapman from Syndicated Magazine stated that, in previous seasons, efforts were made to censor the sexuality of Sailor Uranus, Sailor Neptune, and Fish Eye, to make these characters fit into heteronormative narratives. Yet, this was not possible with the storyline of Sailor Stars, so DiC and Cloverway decided not to air the season, because of "the introduction of the Sailor Starlights, three male pop idols who could magically transform into otherworldly female warriors." Caroline Madden from /Film explained that, while DiC and Cloverway were able to censor the true identities of characters such as Zoisite and Fish Eye by "casting cis women to voice these long-haired characters" and thus "let them pass as cisgender and heterosexual", it would have been impossible to avoid with the Starlights' non-conforming identity. According to an article in Bookmans, there was "no way to edit out the strong transgender/transexual themes that involve the three new characters, the Sailor Star Lights". The article also mentioned the complications derived from the relationship between Seiya and Usagi, and how "even after she discovers the truth later on, she is not phased by the fact that "Fighter" is female." Vargas and Younkin from CBR stated that one of the reasons behind the decision not to air the final season was because "it would have been almost impossible to censor the Sailor Starlights in the way that they had with previous queer characters in the series."

In the Italian dub, instead of changing sex, the team has six members, as the Three Lights summon their twin sisters instead of transforming, as the original depiction was very controversial in Italy. Jones considered this decision "completely ridiculous and only draws attention to the inherent queerness hiding in the series."
