= Chiharu Suzuka =

Japanese voice actress

Chiharu Suzuka (鈴鹿 千春, Suzuka Chiharu; born August 15, 1958) is a Japanese voice actress. She was born in Kita-ku, Kyoto.

== Notable voice roles ==
=== Anime roles ===
- Sakura Hanasaki in (Ep 1, 4) Ai Tenshi Densetsu Wedding Peach DX
- Kumi Honjo in Ai Yori Aoshi
- Juna's mother in Arjuna
- Skyress in Bakugan Battle Brawlers
- Skyress in Bakugan Battle Brawlers: New Vestroia
- Keneesh in Banner of the Stars
- Keneesh in Banner of the Stars II
- Ayako (ep 71), Reiko Andou (ep 255) in Detective Conan
- Manley (ep 15) in Cowboy Bebop
- Makali in Crest of the Stars
- Kamimura in Dai-Guard
- Isabella in Paradise Kiss
- Alicia in Pokémon: The Rise of Darkrai
- Sailor Lead Crow in Sailor Moon Sailor Stars
- Natasha Kazamatsuri in Stellvia of the Universe
- Additional voices in Sukeban Deka
- D's Mother in Vampire Hunter D: Bloodlust
- Sakura Hanasaki in (eps 14,45) Wedding Peach
- Ruka in YuYu Hakusho

=== Dubbing roles ===
- The Distinguished Gentleman (Celia Kirby (Victoria Rowell))
- Dumb and Dumber (Mary Swanson (Lauren Holly))
- Two Much (Liz Kerner (Daryl Hannah))
