= Sailor Uranus =

Fictional character in Sailor Moon

- Sailor Moon character
- Haruka in her Super Sailor Uranus form, as seen in the anime
- First appearance: Sailor Moon chapter #27: "Infinity 1 – Premonition" (1994)
- Created by: Naoko Takeuchi
- Voiced by: Japanese: Megumi Ogata; Junko Minagawa (Sailor Moon Crystal); English: Sarah Lafleur (CWi dub); Erica Mendez (Viz Media dub, Sailor Moon Crystal)

In-universe information
- Full name: Haruka Tenou
- Alias: Princess Uranus
- Gender: Female
- Weapon: Space Sword
- Significant other: Sailor Neptune
- Nationality: Japanese
- Affiliations: Sailor Guardians; Shadow Galactica
- Powers and abilities: Air manipulation; Precognition; High proficiency in hand-to-hand combat and sword combat; Superhuman strength, speed, and agility

Sailor Uranus (Japanese: セーラーウラヌス, Hepburn: Sērā Uranusu) is a fictional character in the Sailor Moon media franchise. Sailor Uranus' alternate identity is Haruka Tenou (天王 はるか, Ten'ō Haruka; renamed "Amara Tenoh" in some English adaptations), a teenage Japanese student and race car driver. Haruka is a member of the Sailor Guardians, female supernatural fighters who protect the Solar System from evil.

Sailor Uranus fights alongside her partner and lover Sailor Neptune. Sailor Uranus possesses powers associated with the wind and sky, precognition, as well as sword combat.

== Profile ==
Haruka is a stubborn, protective individual, as well as strong-willed, capable, charming, and occasionally even daring. She is formally introduced in the third story arc, although she appears in silhouette alongside Sailor Neptune in the final episode of Sailor Moon R. She is the tallest of the Sailor Guardians at 5 ft 11 in (1.80 m), followed by Sailor Pluto at 5 ft 10 in (1.78 m).

Haruka is a racecar driver, even though she is barely sixteen years old at her first appearance. However, the timing of her birthday to the Japanese school year means she is one grade ahead of the Sailor Guardians.

Haruka loves to tease pretty girls. In the manga, she even kisses Usagi Tsukino. Throughout the manga, she lightly flirts with Usagi, either out of habit in her first appearance or just for fun, and eventually Usagi flirts back. Their relationship in the anime is different, as Haruka also refers to Usagi as "Odango", or dumpling, in the same way Tuxedo Mask does as a playful nickname. By the time she returns in Sailor Stars, however, she begins to refer to Usagi as "Kitten".

Haruka with sword and Ferrari F512 M, as drawn by Naoko Takeuchi

Although her relationship with Michiru Kaioh, or Sailor Neptune, is not implicitly sexual until later in the series, their romantic situation is referred to early on and generally understood by most of the metaseries' characters fairly quickly. It is sometimes a source of good-natured humor, particularly because few of the other Guardians have serious romantic prospects in comparison and because the otherwise bold Haruka finds it impolite to discuss romantic matters in public. In the anime, however, the physical aspects of their relationship are limited to handholding, flirting, and sometimes even humorous implications, but generally remains circumspect.

She complicates the perception of her gender by appearing as a "Tuxedo Mask" instead of a Sailor Guardian in her first appearance. This form is never mentioned again. In her civilian form, she also wears the male Mugen Academy uniform. In Sailor Moon Crystal, Sailor Neptune remarks that Sailor Uranus is both male and female. As for pronouns, the characters often refer to Haruka as "her" in the English translation however, after Hotaru reawakens as Sailor Saturn in Episode 2 of Pretty Guardian Sailor Moon Eternal she refers to Haruka as ‘Daddy Haruka’.

Besides her relationship with Michiru, Haruka is also close friends with Setsuna Meioh, because the three of them work closely together. Following the destruction of the Death Busters and the rebirth of Sailor Saturn as an infant, they vow to be her family and care for her. Later story arcs show that the four live together happily for some time. Nothing about Haruka's family life is ever discussed, although she and Michiru appear noticeably wealthy by unknown means. In the manga, Haruka says that she and Michiru have "wealthy patrons".

The anime and manga versions of the character are reasonably interchangeable, although her standoffishness is more pronounced in the anime. Like Michiru, Haruka is sometimes considered an antihero.

In the Sailor Moon musicals (Seramyu), Haruka and Michiru's relationship remains largely unchanged; they are always shown together, which is consistent with both manga and anime, and while their romance in the musicals is usually kept low-key, the actresses for the two do kiss on stage in the omake of Kaguya Shima Densetsu Kaiteiban. They are also the only two Guardians to engage in physical combat with Sailor Galaxia. The other Guardians only use their powers to combat her. As in the anime, however, neither Uranus or Neptune are capable of harming Galaxia in combat. It is seen that Uranus has the ability to sense Neptune's death when Galaxia gravely injures Neptune, who had been weakened while protecting Sailor Mars. Otherwise, the two are shown to be more willing to work as a team with the other Sailor Guardians in the musicals than in the anime, except where plot-lines are directly drawn from the anime, such as their pretended betrayal of the other Guardians in Sailor Stars.

Haruka's ambition prior to becoming a Sailor Guardian was to be a professional racer. Thereafter, driving is still a well-loved hobby and is listed in the manga as her best skill. She is also an accomplished runner, belonging to the track and field club at school. On occasion, Haruka can be seen playing piano in accompaniment during Michiru's violin performances. While physical education is her best class, modern Japanese language is her worst. Haruka is highly private, able to tease others while becoming flustered if teased herself, and has difficulty with confessions. Her favorite food is salad and her least favorite is nattō (fermented soybeans); she also likes the color gold. According to Michiru, Haruka has had trouble with popular men on more than one occasion. Haruka denies this, but it clearly annoys her.

Haruka, Michiru, and Setsuna appear in Sailor Moon SuperS: The Movie, although this conflicts with the general timeline of the series in several ways. Notably, they are more overtly friendly and helpful than they had been when they last met, and Sailor Pluto is present (which conflicts with certain events in the third series).

== Aspects and forms ==
As a character with different incarnations, special powers, transformations, and a long lifetime that spans the Silver Millennium era to the 30th century, Haruka gains multiple aspects and aliases as the series progresses.

=== Sailor Uranus ===
Haruka's Guardian identity. She wears a navy and yellow uniform. Unlike most of the other Guardians, her gloves extend only to mid-forearm. In transformed state, she wears two golden hoop earrings. She is given specific titles throughout the various series, including Guardian of Sky (or "the Skies" in the English manga) and Guardian of Flight. She is known to run as fast as the wind, and can forecast bad things from the sky. Perhaps her titles regarding the sky is in reference to the Greco-Roman Uranus, who was the embodiment of the sky. Sailor Uranus is one of the more aggressive, and yet also intelligent, Sailor Guardians, and carries the Space Sword, which is one of three Talisman carried by herself, Sailor Neptune, and Sailor Pluto. Her personality is no different from when she is a civilian, although certain powers are unavailable to her in that form. Sailor Neptune is her constant companion, and they are rarely separated.

As she grows stronger, Sailor Uranus gains additional powers, and at key points her uniform changes to reflect this. The first change takes place in Act 44 of the manga, when she obtains the Uranus Crystal and her outfit becomes similar to that of Super Sailor Moon. She is not given a new title. A similar event takes place in Episode 167 of the anime, and she is given the name Super Sailor Uranus. A third form appears in Act 49 of the manga, unnamed but similar to Eternal Sailor Moon (without wings). In the official visual book for Sailor Moon Eternal, this form was named "Eternal Sailor Uranus".

=== Princess Uranus ===
On Silver Millennium, Sailor Uranus was also the princess of her home planet. She was among those given the duty of protecting the Solar System from outside invasion. As Princess Uranus, she dwelt in Miranda Castle and wore a deep blue gown; she appears in this form in the original manga Act 48, as well as in supplementary art.

== Special powers and items ==
Sailor Uranus using Space Sword Blaster in Sailor Moon Crystal

Although Haruka is extremely strong and has some psychic sensitivity (mostly in the form of dreams, shared by Michiru and Setsuna, or by "hearing" ill omens in the wind), she is not shown using any special powers in her civilian form. She must first transform into a Sailor Guardian by either raising her hand or using a special device called the Lip Rod in the anime into the air and shouting a special phrase, originally "Uranus Planet Power, Make-up!" (Note: In the Cloverway dub, Haruka does not say 'Make up' when transforming, and the phrase "Uranus Star Power" is usually used instead.) In the manga, she eventually gains her Uranus Crystal and this phrase changes to evoke Uranus Crystal Power. In the anime, although she does upgrade to Super Sailor Uranus, the Crystal is never mentioned and her transformation is not shown on screen.

Sailor Uranus' powers are inspired by Greek mythology, where Uranus is the god of the sky. They are also inspired by Western astrology, where the planet Uranus is associated with natural disasters, such as "earthquakes, tornadoes, typhoons and hurricanes." Her first attack is World Shaking; (Note: In the Cloverway dub, the word Uranus is sometimes added at the beginning.) she gathers energy from the sky and sends it toward her foes by smashing the energy against the ground. She is given three major attacks in the series, and although they all have English names (like those of the other Sailor Guardians), each is also given kanji in the manga to denote the meaning to Japanese readers. For example, World Shaking is given kanji which translate to "sky" (天), "world" (界), and "shake" (震). The intended English pronunciation is given in furigana. This is Sailor Uranus's primary attack for most of the anime series.

Haruka carries a special blade, the Space Sword, which is one of three powerful Talismans, the other two of which are carried by Sailor Neptune and Sailor Pluto. In the manga, she seems to already know it is a Talisman; in the anime, she does not gain the sword until it is revealed as such. In either case, it is used in her second attack, Space Sword Blaster (宇宙剣乱風; "space sword chaos wind"), which fires damaging energy, as well as in physical strikes.

Her third and final attack, appearing only in the manga, is Space Turbulence (宇宙乱気流), (Note: This attack is also used by the evil Sailor Uranus in Act 58, where it is renamed Galactica Space Turbulence.) which uses no item at all. The Uranus Crystal is perhaps her most important possession, as it is her Sailor Crystal and the source of all her power, which becomes especially important in the fifth story arc. It is given to her by Sailor Saturn.

By holding hands with the other Sailor Guardians in a circle, she can use Sailor Teleport or Sailor Planet Power Meditation. When she is controlled by Galaxia in the manga and Crystal, she and the other controlled Sailor Guardians perform Galactica Planet Attack.

== Development ==
The character of Sailor Uranus was not developed until partway through the Sailor Moon series, after the Sailor Guardians were well-established. She was created in tandem with Sailor Neptune, as "complementary but opposite characters," and meant from the beginning to work alongside Sailor Pluto. Creator Naoko Takeuchi has said that she was shocked by the changes made to Haruka's personality in the anime series, but that she was glad fans still liked the character.

Initial drawings of Haruka are softer and more feminine than they would later become; she was originally intended to be involved in the all-female Takarazuka Revue, playing male roles on stage. Although this was not included in the series itself, Takeuchi stated in an interview that she feels Takarazuka is "the maximum level of feminine emancipation. These actress cover all roles of the plays, even the male ones. I was inspired by them to create Haruka." She also described such a figure as "the female best friend and the fairy tale prince in one," stating that she had wanted for a long time to include a character like this in one of her works. Haruka is intended as an older sister figure for the younger girls populating the series, and as a counterpoint to Mamoru, Takeuchi's ideal man.

Haruka is relatively androgynous in the manga and the Crystal, wearing both feminine and masculine outfits, in tune with the traditional depiction of a beautiful androgynous woman in shōjo comics. Takeuchi drew Haruka as physically different when she dresses in male clothes, with a more masculine figure than otherwise. She even refers to Haruka as being "in male form" at these times, and stated that she wanted this to continue in the anime, which it did. In the anime, Haruka's sometimes-feminine appearance is downplayed, and she almost always appears masculine.

Haruka's fascination with racing draws at least some of its details from Takeuchi herself; in the manga, they even share a favorite car, the Ferrari 512M. In the anime, she is seen driving either a yellow or white 1968 Toyota 2000GT open-top (resembling the custom "Bond Model"), or, once, a 1990 montego blue Mazda Mx-5 Miata.

The kanji of Haruka's surname translate as "sky" (天, ten) and "king" (王, ō). Together, they constitute most of the name of the planet Uranus in Japanese, Ten'ōsei (天王星; "sky king star"). Her given name is in hiragana haruka (はるか) and so its meaning is not inherent, but the word itself means "distant" (遥). Her family name is sometimes incorrectly romanized as Tennō, which is in fact a more common writing of the planet's name, but the manga invariably glosses Haruka's surname as Ten'ō where furigana are used, and it is pronounced this way in the anime.

=== Actresses ===
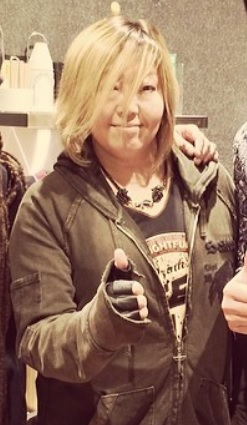
Megumi Ogata voices the character in Japanese.

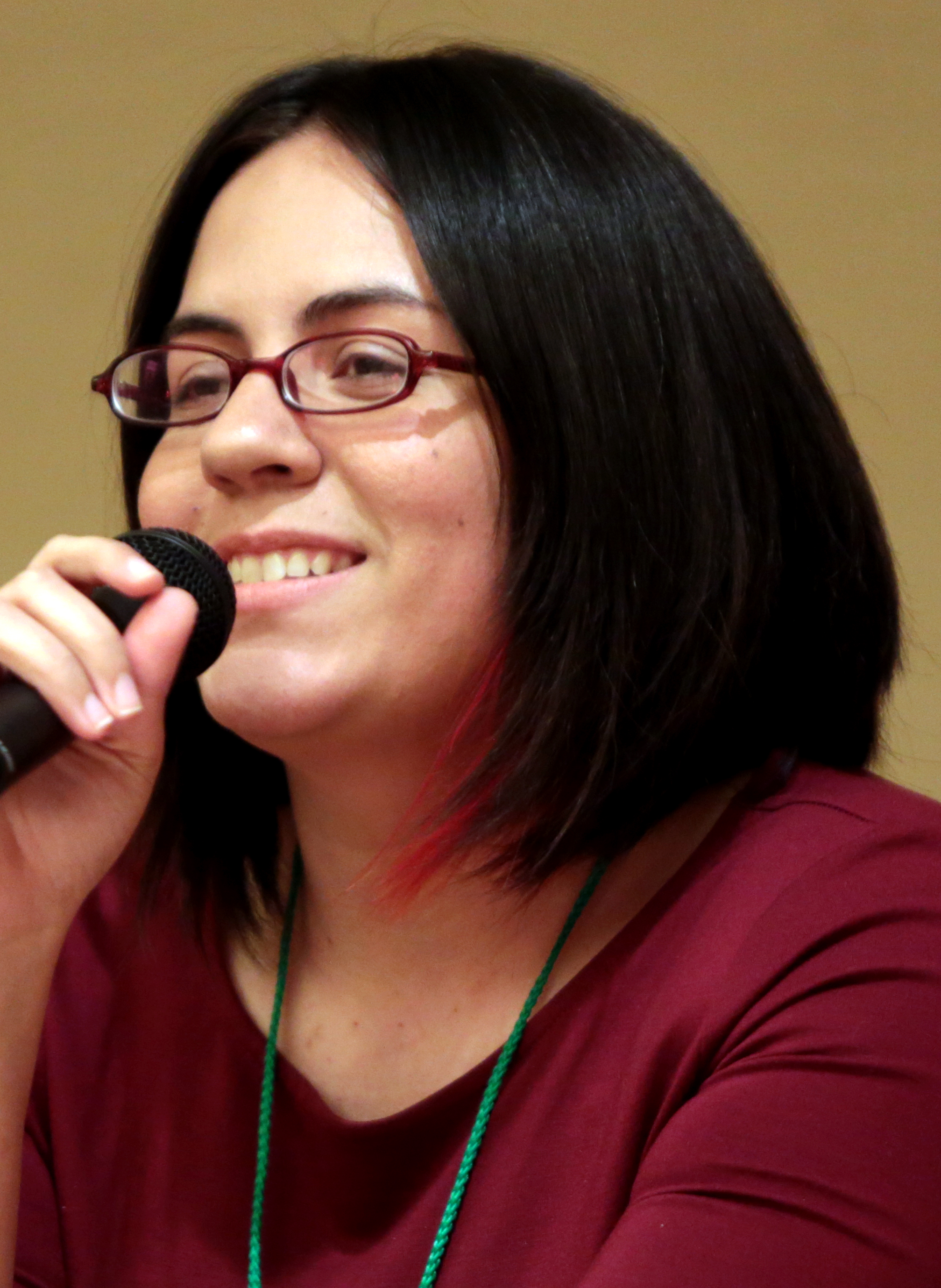
Erica Mendez is the voice of Haruka in the Viz Media dub.

In the Japanese anime and movies, Haruka Tenoh is voiced by veteran voice actress Megumi Ogata, who had previously portrayed a monster-of-the-day, Petz, and a young Mamoru in the series. Ogata was instructed by the director to portray Haruka as if she and Michiru were a married couple. In 1995, Ogata won the 16th Animage Anime Grand Prix award for best voice actress, largely because of her work as Sailor Uranus, breaking up a 12-win streak by Megumi Hayashibara. The previous year she had ranked third, and she ranked second for the next three years before dropping to ninth place in 1999. In the third season of Sailor Moon Crystal, she is voiced by Junko Minagawa.

In the original English dub, her name is changed to "Amara" and she is voiced by Sarah Lafleur. Haruka is voiced by Erica Mendez in the Viz Media English dub.

In the Russian version (which is closer to the Japanese version rather than the English one), she is voiced by Lyudmila Ilyina. However, she voices all the female and child characters in the series, changing the timbre of her voice according to the variety of roles. Haruka's name has not been changed.

In the stage musicals, Haruka has been played by 6 actresses: Sanae Kimura, Nao Takagi, Asako Uchida, Akiko Nakayama, Shu Shiotsuki and Shinjyu Terada. Sanae Kimura regarded the betrayal of Uranus and Neptune in her last musical, Eien Densetsu kaiteiban, to be a very difficult scene for her and cried during it.

Nao Takagi, the longest-running of the musical actresses, decided that she wanted to play the role of the "Sailor Soldier with the blonde hair" when she saw one of the earlier musicals, despite having never performed before. Takagi said she was "really happy to be able to play Uranus" and regarded Uranus as "a completely cool, handsome Soldier". She has stated that certain scenes involving herself and Yuhka Asami (as Sailor Neptune) were specially created just for the two of them, the song "Destined Couple" in particular.

== Reception and influence ==
The official Sailor Moon popularity polls listed Haruka Tenoh and Sailor Uranus as separate characters. In 1994, with fifty one choices, Sailor Uranus was the sixth most popular character, receiving over nine thousand votes more than Haruka, who was the tenth. In early 1996, with fifty one choices, Uranus was the tenth most popular character, and Haruka was the twelfth. Haruka Tenoh came first in the favorite female character poll in Animage 1995. The following year she came seventh. Mari Nishimura found that Haruka became "very popular" with female fans due to her "clear male attributes".

Sailor Uranus has been described as having "clearly masculine traits", and that she protects Usagi "as a man would a woman." She is presented as more willing to resort to whatever means is necessary, and as physically stronger. In her response to an academic essay on Sailor Moon by Mary Grigsby, author Emily Ravenwood compared Haruka and Michiru's relationship with Zoisite and Kunzite's relationship explaining that "in both cases, the feminine and masculine attributes are highlighted with a heavy hand (deliberate display of stereotypes)." According to her, Kunzite and Haruka are stoic and show no emotions, and in the relationship with Michiru, "Haruka is the fighter, the physically directed one, the one who restrains her emotional involvement, the protective one, in short the perfect butch."

Venita Blackburn of The New York Times opined that Sailor Moon is a "transformative experience" about friendship and liberation that does not match the world's expectations of femininity, adding that its "iconic status" within the queer community was "no accident". She stated that the world of Sailor Moon is "interested in transformation, in upsetting expectations of presentation and value related to girlhood, masculinity, strength and gender roles", further adding that in Sailor Moon, the concept of transformation is "about light, magic and power hidden in the ordinariness of living", concluding that "there is nothing queerer than that".

=== Censorship ===
In an effort to avoid the controversy that a lesbian character in a cartoon aimed towards a younger audience would cause, given the social mores, Haruka and Michiru's relationship has been censored in certain countries. In North America, the former English dub stated that Haruka and Michiru are cousins, even going so far as to occasionally state this through characters who should not know such information. However, whether in an attempt to be more faithful to the original Japanese or through failure to edit consistently, several episodes of the former English dub retained a noticeable amount of their casual flirting. Due to the censorship and problematic dubbing, some viewers inferred not only a homosexual relationship between the two girls, but also an incestuous one. It has even been implied that the difficulties in dubbing Haruka and Michiru's relationship are part of the reason why there was a gap of several years between the dubbing of the earlier series and the dubbing of Sailor Moon S. However, in Japan, there were also some controversies around the character.

Viz Media and Studiopolis' English-language redub of the series in 2016 would address the censorship issue by restoring any deleted scenes and preserving the integrity of the original Japanese scripts. In 2020, Viz Media released a new dub of Sailor Moon Sailor Stars, but in what they call a "translation error", they refer to Haruka and Michiru in a booklet as "friends" rather than a lesbian couple. The company later issued an apology on Twitter, in which they acknowledge that the two characters "are not friends, but in fact, partners."

== See also ==
- LGBT themes in comics
- Uranus in fiction
- Uranus (mythology)
- Anu
