= Shadow Galactica =

Fictional group of characters in Sailor Moon

- Members of Shadow Galactica. Left column: Sailor Lethe, Sailor Mnemosyne, Sailor Phi, Sailor Chi. Center column: Galaxia in her civilian and Sailor Guardian forms. Right column: Sailor Iron Mouse, Sailor Aluminum Seiren, Sailor Lead Crow, Sailor Tin Nyanko, and Sailor Heavy Metal Papillon.

Publication information
- Publisher: Kodansha
- First appearance: Sailor Moon chapter #50: Stars 1 (March 1996)
- Created by: Naoko Takeuchi

In-story information
- Base(s): Galactica Palace (manga, Sailor Moon Cosmos); Galaxy TV (Sailor Moon Sailor Stars)
- Leader(s): Sailor Galaxia; Chaos
- Member(s): Sailor Animamates; Sailor Phi; Sailor Chi; Sailor Lethe; Sailor Mnemosyne; Phage

Shadow Galactica (シャドウ・ギャラクティカ, Shadō Gyarakutika) are a group of fictional characters in the Sailor Moon manga series created by Naoko Takeuchi. They are the villains of the series' fifth and final story arc, called Stars in the manga, Sailor Moon Sailor Stars in the first anime adaptation, and Sailor Moon Cosmos in the second anime adaptation. Shadow Galactica is first introduced in chapter #50 "Stars 1", originally published in Japan's Nakayoshi magazine on March 28, 1996.

Shadow Galactica as an organization devotes itself to stealing starseeds, the essence of sentient life, from all in the Milky Way. Its members are led by Sailor Galaxia and have the ultimate goal of reorganizing the universe in the image that Chaos desires. The Sailor Moon musicals state that they have already conquered 80% of the Milky Way, and all 88 constellations—with only Sailor Moon's Solar System remaining. Sailor Galaxia's castle, Galactica Palace (ギャラクティカ・パレス, Gyarakutika Paresu), serves as Shadow Galactica's base of operations. It is located at the Galactic Center, in Sagittarius Zero Star, and it is built around the Galaxy Cauldron, the birthplace of all life in the Milky Way. In the original anime adaptation, Shadow Galactica's base is Galaxy TV (銀河TV, Ginga Terebi).

== Key figures ==
=== Sailor Galaxia ===
Sailor Galaxia (セーラーギャラクシア, Sērā Gyarakushia) is an orange-haired human-like female alien and the main villainess of the fifth story arc. She is the self-proclaimed "Golden Queen of Shadow Galactica", and is also described as the Guardian of Solitude. According to Naoko Takeuchi, Galaxia was created as a Sailor Guardian "to rival Sailor Moon", and her golden uniform and costume was described by her as very difficult to draw.

Before the events of Sailor Moon, Sailor Galaxia lived on a small planet she deemed "trash". She was abused until the day her powers awakened. Without feeling any purpose for herself, and lacking satisfaction in the role of a mere Sailor Guardian, Galaxia began to crave power. She destroyed her planet and left it in search of another homeland. In her travels, she comes upon Chaos in the form of Wiseman, who showed her what she was looking for—the Galaxy Cauldron. She discovers that for her to gain control of the Galaxy Cauldron, she has to gather the Sailor Crystals, the starseeds of the Sailor Guardians of the galaxy. Those powers combined with that of Sailor Moon would give her the power to destroy Chaos and rule the galaxy. She then created Shadow Galactica and began traveling to planet after planet, turning them into places of death and stealing the starseeds of their guardian Sailor Guardians. In her first conquest on Earth, she steals Mamoru's Golden Crystal; and after that, she and her henchwomen steal the Sailor Crystals of each of the Sailor Guardians on Earth until only Usagi and Chibichibi are left. At the Galaxy Cauldron, Galaxia fights them, until Chaos attempts to kill Galaxia by blasting her off a cliff. Sailor Moon rescues her from falling over the cliff into the cauldron, and Galaxia finally realizes that she has always really wanted love, not power. By accepting Usagi's offer of friendship, the bracelets which supplied Galaxia with life and power shatter, and she dies peacefully.

In the anime adaptation, Sailor Galaxia is the strongest Sailor Guardian in the Milky Way. Before the beginning of the series, she ends the Sailor Wars by sealing the source of all malice, Chaos, within her body to save the cosmos. To prevent her starseed—the "Light of Hope"—from being corrupted by Chaos, Galaxia expelled it from her body and sends it into the galaxy in the form of Chibichibi. Becoming possessed by Chaos, Galaxia destroys various planets. Planning to steal the starseeds in the Solar System, Galaxia breaks the seal of Queen Nehelenia to force the awakening of Sailor Saturn. After Nehelenia's redemption, Galaxia uses the Sailor Animamates to steal the Sailor Crystals, but they are unsuccessful. Eventually, after killing Tuxedo Mask, Princess Kakyuu and most of the Sailor Guardians, she fights Sailor Moon and the Sailor Starlights. In the climax of the battle, Chaos completely possesses Galaxia, whose skin turns light grey and her uniform turns black, with bat-like wings. In the end, Sailor Moon refuses to fight Galaxia and releases Chaos from her body. She leaves and returns to space, intent on returning the stolen starseeds.

In the Sailor Moon musicals, Galaxia features prominently in the Sailor Moon Sailor Stars musical and in its revision, the Eien Densetsu musical and in its revision, Shin Densetsu Kourin, Starlights—Ryuusei Densetsu and Kakyuu-Ouhi Kourin. Her musical story is similar to both the manga and anime adaptation. As in the manga, the final showdown with Galaxia often occurs in the Galaxy Cauldron. As in the anime, Sailor Uranus and Sailor Neptune pose as Galaxia's henchwomen. Galaxia generally employs fewer Animamates in the musicals than in either the manga or anime, but several times she resurrects villains from past arcs. Depending on the musical's story, Galaxia is either the final or penultimate enemy the Sailor Guardians must defeat. In Eien Densetsu, Galaxia is successfully purged of evil and sacrifices herself to help the Guardians destroy Chaos, who had been posing as a low-ranking minion. In another version of the ending, Queen Beryl will become Queen Metalia and fight alongside Galaxia, who will herself become Sailor Chaos after being completely possessed by Chaos, forcing the Guardians to defeat them both.

In the anime series, her voice actress is Mitsuko Horie. In the two-part Cosmos movie, Sailor Galaxia's voice actress is Megumi Hayashibara. In the English dubs of Sailor Stars and Cosmos, her voice is provided by Carrie Keranen. In the stage musicals, five different actresses have portrayed her: Saori Sara, Tamami Matsumoto, Takemi, Yumie Sakaguchi and Coco Isuzu. Matsumoto stated that she greatly enjoyed the role: "ordering people around and being above others is such a great feeling".

=== Chaos ===
Chaos (カオス, Kaosu) is a primeval entity that has existed since the beginning of the universe and the overarching antagonist of the Sailor Moon series.

Chaos appears as an enormous mass of black fourth-dimensional space. It is revealed that Chaos was a being who failed to become a star, and that it merged itself with the Galaxy Cauldron, so destroying Chaos would result in the destruction of the Cauldron as well. It emerges that, during the course of the series, Chaos sends out incarnations in the form of Sailor Moon's major enemies (Queen Metaria, Wiseman, Master Pharaoh 90 and Queen Nehelenia), and eventually uses Sailor Galaxia to steal Sailor Crystals to attract Sailor Moon to the Cauldron. In the end, with the help of all of the Guardians, Sailor Moon is able to force it into the Cauldron and everyone who was killed is sent back, each to their planet and time of origin, reincarnated after the battle. However, it is indicated that Chaos is not dead and will come back as Sailor Chaos much the same as it did in Sailor Cosmos's future.

In the anime adaptation, Galaxia reveals herself as the guardian who sealed Chaos within her own body and thus saved the galaxy. She holds the golden bracelets created for her by Chaos which grants her eternal life and the power to extract starseeds. She also gives each Sailor Animamate a pair to wear. Chaos corrupts Galaxia, so that Galaxia can fight the Light of Hope, which is Galaxia's own star seed. However, Sailor Moon is able to reach the small bit of hope left in Galaxia's own heart, and she releases Chaos from her body. Chaos leaves Galaxia to inhabit the hearts of all people, which was stated to be its original residence.

In the Eien Densetsu musical, Chaos appears as Kyaosu (キャオス, Kyaosu), another male servant of Galaxia. He functions as comic relief and is apparently very weak. He disguises himself as the director of a school play that the younger Guardians are starring in and also poses as the Three Lights' manager. Later on in the musical, he makes a deal to assist Sailor Moon, taking her and the Starlights to the Galaxy Cauldron and promising to save a Sailor Guardian from death (he saves Sailor Mercury). However, after Galaxia's defeat, Kyaosu reveals himself to be Chaos. With his power sealed inside Galaxia, he was forced to inhabit a weak physical shell but after Moon purged his energy from Galaxia, he regains his full strength and once more threatens to destroy the galaxy. He is defeated when all the Guardians, including a revived Galaxia, combine their powers.

In the Cosmos film, Chaos is voiced by Mitsuki Saiga. In the English dub of Cosmos, it is voiced by Kari Wahlgren. In the musicals, Ryuuji Kasahara played the role of Kyaosu.

==== Sailor Chaos ====
Sailor Chaos (セーラーカオス, Sērā Kaosu) represents Chaos reborn. According to Sailor Cosmos, Chaos will emerge from the Galaxy Cauldron reborn as a powerful Sailor Guardian. Sailor Cosmos, feeling helpless after losing everything she loves at the hands of Sailor Chaos, disguised herself as ChibiChibi to travel back in time and convince Sailor Moon to destroy the Galaxy Cauldron, and thereby to prevent Sailor Chaos emerging to start a new series of devastating wars. Sailor Chaos never actually appears as a living character in the series; however, both the manga and the Cosmos film display a vague image only once—as a flash-forward—when Sailor Cosmos mentions her.

== Sailor Animamates ==
The Sailor Animamates (セーラーアニマメイツ, Sērā Animameitsu; occasionally romanized as "Sailor Anima-Mates") are Shadow Galactica's main reapers of starseeds, and are led by Sailor Chi and Sailor Phi. They bear names prefixed by the title "Sailor" followed by the name of a chemical element (usually a metal or an alloy) and the name of an animal. Despite the titles, none of them is a true Sailor Guardian but merely normal living-beings who gave up their own star-seeds to Galaxia to become one — each of them murdered the Guardian of their home planet in order to win Galaxia's favor.

In the anime adaptation, contrary to their manga counterparts, it is stated by Princess Kakyuu that the Animamates were once true Sailor Guardians. The Animamates disguise themselves as employees of Tokyo's primary television station, Galaxy TV, to get closer to their victims. Under Galaxia's command, they search for true star-seeds whose shines can survive exposure to the outside world. Each of them were given a pair of Galaxia's golden bracelets that grants them the power to extract starseeds and even turn their victims into Phage. They gave up their own Sailor Crystals to Galaxia to possess them, therefore taking the bracelets out would instantly kill them. Eternal Sailor Moon matches them at every turn: she alone has the power to heal Phage and restore star seeds to innocents. They can warp from place to place using a black phone booth.

All five of the original Animamates appear in various Sailor Moon musicals, including Sailor Stars, Eien Densetsu, Starlights Ryuusei Densetsu, and Kakyuu Ouhi Kourin. They pose as a dance troupe called the "Dancing Animamates" and go by pseudonyms: Iron Mouse as "Chū Rat", Aluminum Seiren as "Half Bird", Lead Crow as "Manila Karasu", and Heavy Metal Papillon as "Miss Butterfly"; only Tin Nyanko retains her alias from the anime. In addition, the musicals introduce two new Animamates: Sailor Pewter Fox (セーラーピューターフォックス, Sērā Pyūtā Fokkusu), who acts as leader of the Animamates in these musicals, and Sailor Titanium Kerokko (セーラーチタンケロッコ, Sērā Chitan Kerokko), also known as "Sailor Mitis Kerokko" in Eien Densetsu. Pewter Fox gets many solos in the musicals, indicating the character's high rank in Shadow Galactica. Pewter Fox has been played by Rei Ku and Junko Iemura, while Titanium Kerokko has been played by Haruko Yamaguchi and Megumi Wakamatsu.

=== Sailor Iron Mouse ===
Sailor Iron Mouse (セーラーアイアンマウス, Sērā Aian Mausu) appears first of the Sailor Animamates. True to her name of mouse, Iron Mouse is very short, at least a foot shorter than all her targets (Takeuchi's notes in the manga state that she is Chibiusa's height, but she is not quite that short in the anime).

Iron Mouse fights the Sailor Guardians during the joint concert between the Three Lights and Michiru Kaioh. She is the first one killed by Sailor Star Healer. Her attack is Galactica Crunch. It later emerges that Iron Mouse killed Sailor Chū, the Guardian from her home planet Chū, taking her star-seed so that Iron Mouse could be a Sailor Guardian.

In the anime adaptation, she goes by the human pseudonym Chūko Nezu (根津 宙子, Nezu Chūko). This pseudonym has a name expressing word-play: in Japanese, Chūko and Nezu are each perfectly acceptable names; however, "chū" is the sound made by mice, and nezu is short for nezumi, which means "mouse". She exhibits a personality both childlike and intense; she usually chooses famous or impressive people as her victims, seems to enjoy her work, and is openly fearful of Galaxia. She is also known to travel in a phone booth similar to a TARDIS. She is also afraid of cats. After failing to steal the star seeds, she becomes the first one killed by Galaxia.

In the anime series, her voice actress is Eriko Hara in Japanese and in the Cosmos film, it is Sena Koizumi. In the English dubs of Sailor Stars and Cosmos, Sailor Iron Mouse is voiced by Katie Leigh. In the musicals, Chie Maruyama, Aki Kudo and Shion Aoki portray Iron Mouse.

=== Sailor Aluminum Siren ===
Sailor Aluminum Siren (セーラーアルーミナムセイレーン, Sērā Arūminamu Seirēn) becomes the second of the Sailor Animamates to appear. The Greek word Seiren in her name means the same as the English "Siren" and often appears romanized as such. In most iterations, her attack is Galactica Tsunami, but in the Cosmos film, it is Galactica Wave.

Aluminum Siren first appears in Act 51 on the roof of Jūban High School and attacks Usagi and Seiya with Galactica Tsunami. She succeeds in stealing the star seeds of Sailor Mercury and Sailor Jupiter, killing them instantly; then Sailor Star Maker and Sailor Star Fighter kill her. Princess Kakyuu later reveals that Aluminum Siren eliminated Sailor Mermaid, the Guardian of her home planet Mermaid, in order to get Galaxia's bracelets. According to the Materials Collection, she sings and writes ballads as a hobby.

In the anime adaptation, Aluminum Siren makes her first appearance in episode 180. Her human pseudonym is Reiko Aya (彩 れい子, Aya Reiko), which may be a pun on "puppet," "mermaid," "makeup" and "child spirit." She is very polite, ditzy and oblivious when off-duty, and is always eating or feeling hungry; once engaged in battle, however, she drops her flaws and becomes completely ruthless. Aluminum Siren works together with Sailor Lead Crow, who reveals that they once competed for the position of Number One Animamate. She eventually discovers Sailor Moon's identity and nearly succeeds in killing her, but the Inner Guardians and the Sailor Starlights stopped her. Despite learning their identities, as well as finding a strong star seed, Aluminum Siren is killed by Galaxia for failing to kill Sailor Moon.

In the anime series, she is voiced by Kikuko Inoue in Japanese and by male voice actor Ayumu Murase in the Cosmos film. In the English dubs of Sailor Stars and Cosmos, Sailor Aluminum Siren is voiced by Faye Mata. In the musicals, she is played by Anri Oonuki and Yuka Kobayashi.

=== Sailor Lead Crow ===
Sailor Lead Crow (セーラーレッドクロウ, Sērā Reddo Kurō) is the third of the Sailor Animamates to appear. The Tokyopop manga translated her name as Red Crow.

Lead Crow first appears in Act 52 at Rei Hino's temple to confront her fellow Coronians, Phobos and Deimos — who are actually Rei's guardians. She succeeds in stealing their star seeds before Sailor Moon destroys her with Starlight Honeymoon Therapy Kiss attack. It is later revealed that Lead Crow killed Sailor Coronis, the Guardian from Coronis (home planet of Phobos, Deimos, and Lead Crow), taking her star seed so that Lead Crow could be a Sailor Guardian. Her attack is Galactica Tornado. According to the Materials Collection, she is a sadist, and can also manipulate rot.

In its anime adaptation, Lead Crow first appears as a partner of Aluminum Siren. She is said to be the leader of the Animamates, and calls her partner her "greatest rival"; however, she harbors great concern for her fellow Animamate, and when Aluminum Siren is killed, tries to carry on the same work. Her human pseudonym in the anime is Akane Karasuma (烏丸 あかね, Karasuma Akane), which is taken from the words for a certain shade of red (pronounced the same as "lead" in Japanese) and for "crow". Despite having a bad temper, Lead Crow is very intelligent and is a skilled fighter, often attacking her enemies with a whip. She dislikes Tin Nyanko, but partners with her for a time, which leads to her being killed by her own trap when Tin Nyanko sabotages it.

Lead Crow appeared in a few of the musicals, including "Starlights—Ryuusei Densetsu" and its revision. Like the rest of the Animamates, she poses as a member of a dancing troupe known as the Dancing Animamates. She acts as choreographer for the group. "Ryuusei Densetsu" also presents her as Japan's leading expert in Filipino dance, a play on her name.

In the anime, she is voiced by Chiharu Suzuka and by Yoko Hikasa in the Cosmos film. In the English dubs of Sailor Stars and Cosmos, she is voiced by Debi Mae West. In the musicals, she is played by Ado Endoh and Irya Yuuto.

=== Sailor Tin Nyanko ===
Sailor Tin Nyanko (セーラーティンにゃんこ, Sērā Tin Nyanko) is the fourth of the Sailor Animamates to appear. Her human pseudonym is Nyanko Suzu (鈴 にゃんこ, Suzu Nyanko), which is drawn from her Guardian name and from suzu, the Japanese word for both "tin" and "bell." Nyanko is a colloquial term for a cat, drawn from nyan (the Japanese equivalent of meow). Her pseudonym in the English manga is Kitty Bell. She has a cold personality, willing to kill anyone who is in her way.

Tin Nyanko first appears in Act 52 as Nyanko Suzu, a new transfer student from Libya. Like Lead Crow, she confronts people from her home planet, Mau—in this case, Luna and Artemis. Diana arrives and tries to protect them, but Tin Nyanko's electric Galactica Puppet attack transforms all three into their humanoid selves, then injures the crescent moon markings on their foreheads and turns them into ordinary and badly injured cats. Sailor Star Fighter attacks her, and although she escapes unharmed, she is killed by Galaxia. It is revealed that Tin Nyanko killed Sailor Mau, the Guardian of her home planet, taking her star seed so that Tin Nyanko could be a Sailor Guardian. Luna and Artemis call Sailor Mau their planet's only hero (her planet's name comes from a real species of cat called the Egyptian Mau). According to the Materials Collection, Tin Nyanko also has the ability to manipulate scents and supposedly has nine lives.

In the anime adaptation, Tin Nyanko is a rival to Sailors Lead Crow and Aluminum Siren. She is partly responsible for both their deaths, and in the process learns Sailor Moon's identity. During their confrontation, Usagi attempts to heal her with her attack, and succeeds only in knocking off one of her bracelets. This allows Nyanko's true personality to partially reveal itself, and even half of her otherwise black uniform turns white. However, she is torn between her duty to kill the Sailor Guardians and a new urge to rebel against her master. However, Sailor Galaxia decides to kill her.

In the Sailor Stars musical and its revision, Sailor Tin Nyanko was one of Galaxia's henchwomen sent to Earth to destroy the Sailor Guardians. She participated in Juban High School's musical festival alongside the other Animamates.

In the anime series, Sailor Tin Nyanko is voiced by Ikue Ōtani in Japanese and by Mariya Ise in the Cosmos film. In the English dubs of Sailor Stars and Cosmos, she is voiced by Corina Boettger. She was played by Tomomi Seo, Toni Hosokawa and Miu Hashigaki in the musicals.

=== Sailor Heavy Metal Papillon ===
Sailor Heavy Metal Papillon (セーラーヘビーメタルパピヨン, Sērā Hebīmetaru Papiyon) is the fifth and last of the Sailor Animamates to appear. Her name incorporates the French word for butterfly; in Japanese culture, butterflies are often considered to be symbolic of the soul. In the Materials Collection artbook, and the musical Ryuusei Densetsu, the word "Heavy" is omitted from her name. She is the only member of the Sailor Animamates to not appear in the original anime.

Sailor Heavy Metal Papillon comes from the planet Cocoon. Known as the "Soul Hunter," Sailor Heavy Metal Papillon guards a graveyard in the center of the galaxy, surrounded by butterflies. These butterflies are the remnants of the dead Sailor Guardians whose Sailor Crystals had been taken. She shows Eternal Sailor Moon, Sailor Kakyuu, and ChibiChibi the graves that had been dug for them, binds them with vines, and prepares to burn them to death. The three are saved by the arrival of Sailor Chibi Moon and the Sailor Quartet, who destroy Sailor Heavy Metal Papillon with their group attack. The Materials Collection states that Sailor Heavy Metal Papillon manipulates fire, and attacks with the fiery Galactica Scales, although this attack is not named in the manga. Furthermore, she is described as a parent as well as a samba dancer, and has "high sex appeal."

In the Cosmos film, she is voiced by Haruka Kudo in the original Japanese version and by Amanda Lee in the English dub. She also appears in the musicals, portrayed by Keiko Endoh.

== Servants ==
=== Sailor Chi and Sailor Phi ===
Sailor Chi (セーラーΧ(カイ), Sērā Kai) and Sailor Phi (セーラーΦ(ファイ), Sērā Fai) are twin sisters and Galaxia's closest servants. They are named for two letters of the Greek alphabet, Χ (Chi) and Φ (Phi). Each carries a staff with a sun symbol on top of it, which they can use to fight. Sailor Phi also uses a light-based attack called Galactica Plants Blizzard. The pair are known as the "Star Gardeners", and watch over the starseeds that are kept in the Star Garden, which is set around Galactica Palace. They serve as messengers for Galaxia, overseeing her other servants and reporting on their actions. Sailor Chi and Sailor Phi are responsible for the deaths of all three Sailor Starlights, Princess Kakyuu, Sailors Lethe and Mnemosyne, and probably many others. They are defeated by Eternal Sailor Moon in Act 56, but not before they greatly increase Galaxia's power.

In the musicals, Sailor Chi and Sailor Phi are often seen with Sailor Theta (セーラーΘ(シータ), Sērā Shīta), but they are Galaxia's lowest ranked servants, collectively known as "Galactica Troops". They receive their orders from the other members of Shadow Galactica, and there is no indication that they have a special role as Star Gardeners. Phi and Chi's uniforms are also altered to be completely different from their manga counterparts and to match Theta. In the first Stars musical, Sailor Phi goes by the name "Shadow Bee", Sailor Chi goes by "Shadow Mantis", and Sailor Theta goes by "Shadow Bug". After the Sailor Stars musical, the bug theme was dropped. The Galactica Troops disguise themselves as Jūban Municipal High School students or as backup dancers for the Three Lights (depending on the musical) in order to observe the Sailor Guardians, and eventually attack them. The three of them engage a revived Queen Beryl in combat but are defeated by her, and subsequently killed by Galaxia for their failure.

In the Cosmos film, Sailors Chi and Phi are voiced by Yuka Komatsu and Fumie Mizusawa in the original Japanese version and by Amber Lee Connors and Lisa Ortiz in the English dub, respectively. Sailor Chi has been portrayed on stage by Ado Endoh, Sachiko Akimoto, and Mari Yasuda; Sailor Phi has been portrayed by Kaori Ishikawa, Rieko Akimoto and Mika Komura; Sailor Theta has been played by Yūko Matsumoto, Ado Endoh, and Azusa Katagiri.

=== Sailor Lethe and Sailor Mnemosyne ===
Sailor Lethe (セーラーレテ, Sērā Rete) and Sailor Mnemosyne (セーラームネモシュネ, Sērā Munemoshune) are twin sisters that appear only in the manga and in the Cosmos film. Sailor Lethe is named for a naiad in Greek mythology, and for a river of the Greek underworld where dead souls go to forget their past lives before being reincarnated. Sailor Mnemosyne is named for the Titaness of memory, the mother of the muses, as well as another river in the underworld which brought remembrance and omniscience. Sailor Lethe has an electric attack called Galactica Myosotis Alpestris, which she used to attack Usagi. Myosotis alpestris is the name of an alpine species of Forget-me-not.

They come from the conjoined twin planets Lethe and Mnemosyne, respectively. Their planets were small, poor, and plagued by violence and chaos. When Galaxia appeared and brought death and ruin, the two had no choice but to follow her in the hopes of someday finding peace. Sailor Lethe first introduces herself as the ferryman of the River of Oblivion, trapping Sailor Moon at the bottom. She kills Luna, Artemis, and Diana, and attacks Sailor Moon. She is stopped by Sailor Mnemosyne, who says that Sailor Moon has been hurt enough. Lethe says that Sailor Moon's Sailor Crystal is the cause for all of the wars they are experiencing, and that if it is destroyed, there will be peace. Sailor Moon offers her life if it will end the violence. Lethe and Mnemosyne are so moved by her self-sacrifice that they realize that whether or not Sailor Moon dies, the war will continue. Just as they are about to release the Guardians, Sailor Chi and Sailor Phi appear, who berate them and take their Sailor Crystals, killing them.

In the Cosmos film, Sailors Lethe and Mnemosyne are voiced by Shiori Mikami and Kanae Itō in the original Japanese version and by Risa Mei and Megan Harvey in the English dub, respectively. In the musical Le Mouvement Final, Lethe and Mnemosyne do not appear but their roles are taken by Sailors Lead Crow and Aluminum Siren, respectively.

=== Other members ===
In the manga and the Crystal, Galaxia revives Tuxedo Mask and the Sailor Team and forces them into her service. While under her control, they battle Eternal Sailor Moon, Sailor Chibi Moon, and Sailor Chibi Chibi with evil Galactica versions of their normal attacks. They attack in turn and together, injuring Sailor Moon and breaking her wings before she finally destroys their bracelets. They are reduced to ash, but their Sailor Crystals hang in the air briefly before Galaxia reclaims them.

In the anime, Galaxia frees Queen Nehelenia from the seal and encourages her to take her revenge by unleashing a nightmare upon the "people of the White Moon". It is not revealed until the final few episodes that Galaxia contracted Nehelenia into her service for the sole purpose of forcing Sailor Saturn to reawaken her Guardian powers and get a mature starseed, as at the time Hotaru was merely an infant. Also in the anime, Sailor Uranus and Sailor Neptune willingly join her so that they can "remain together forever", getting Shadow Galactica's bracelets. They make Galaxia, as well as Sailor Moon and the Starlights, believe that they are under Galaxia's control, but their act is just a ruse to get close enough to Galaxia to turn on her and attempt to take her star seed. However, since Galaxia no longer has her star seed, their sneak attack fails and she removes their bracelets, which kills them. This scene is replicated in various musicals and has the song Orleans no Sei Senshi~Uranus-Neptune no Uragiri (Holy Guardians of Orleans~Uranus and Neptune's betrayal) appear in each version.

In the musicals, Galaxia often resurrects antagonists from past arcs to join her other servants. Most frequently she brings back Queen Beryl, who works with Galaxia in Eien Densetsu, its revised edition, and Shin Densetsu Kourin. The Amazon Trio and some of their Lemures are made members in Shin Densetsu Kourin. Beryl's Four Kings of Heaven are revived alongside her in Starlights—Ryuusei Densetsu and Kakyuu-Ouhi Kourin—The Second Stage Final. Some original characters have also been introduced in Sailor Stars and its revised edition: in addition to Sailors Pewter Fox, Titanium Kerokko, and Theta, these musicals marked the debut of Sailor Buttress (セーラーバトレス, Sērā Batoresu), who functions as Galaxia's adviser and herald, and gives orders to the other members of Shadow Galactica. Her uniform bears a striking resemblance to Galaxia's fully possessed form from the anime, sans wings, and retaining the golden bracelets. Also introduced in these musicals is MC Fly (MC・フラーイ, MC Furāi), a male servant of Galaxia that leads the Galactica Troops. He appeared first as the master of ceremonies (hence his name) for a school talent-competition, and has the ability of shapeshifting. His true form is that of a fly-man, with antenna on his head and wings. Shiori Seki portrayed Sailor Buttress, while Ryuuji Kasahara, who later played Kyaosu, portrayed MC Fly.

== Phage ==
The term Phage (ファージ, Fāji) occurs only in the anime series. It describes any monster of the week formed by the use of Galaxia's golden armlets, which are infused with the power of Chaos and are used by a Sailor Animamate. After an Animamate has extracted the star seed from a normal person they would often abandon each of them upon discovering that the victim only has a "normal" star seed before their brightness fades away. A person's star seed will then turn black as it corrupts and transforms the person into a sort of parody Sailor Guardian (gender being retained). They change shape based on their dominant personality trait or hobby, and take on exaggerated mannerisms and names such as "Sailor Guts", "Sailor Teacher", or "Sailor Antique". After fighting the Phage, Eternal Sailor Moon has the power to restore them to their normal forms and to return their normal star seed back into their human bodies using the Starlight Honeymoon Therapy Kiss and the Silver Moon Crystal Power Kiss attacks. Princess Kakyuu is implied to have this power as well. Those who possess "true" starseeds (i.e. the Sailor Guardians and Tuxedo Mask) do not transform into Phage, and if their star seeds are taken, their body fades away killing them instantly.

While Phage do not appear in the manga or musicals, they are referenced in one of the songs in the musical.

== Reception ==
In an academic thesis discussing gender and inclusion in Japanese cultural products, author Marina Albaladejo established a contrast between Sailor Galaxia and Sailor Moon, stating that the latter understands that the strength of a Sailor Guardian comes from the union of all warriors, and not from the abuse and pretension of a single warrior, as Galaxia herself believed. In her review of Shinto and feminism in Sailor Moon, author Sarah Reeves wrote that Galaxia is "a soldier who has the ability to tap into the power of the entire galaxy", but that even with this power, Sailor Moon manages to defeat her by using her purifying abilities.

In a review of the first half of the final season of the anime for Anime News Network, author Rebecca Silverman compared the Sailor Animamates with the Four Kings of Heaven, explaining that while both groups are not similar to each other, the way in which the Animamates pick their victims follows "the standard operating procedure of all Sailor Moon villains—find the most famous or prettiest person and just assume they're who you want, rinse, repeat." In particular, the author found Iron Mouse as one of the more "endearing" antagonists of the series and wonders why other villains refused to engage with Sailor Moon's speeches the way she did. Silverman concluded her review stating that Galaxia's overall character set up was one of the highlights of the season. While reviewing the second half of Sailor Stars, Silverman described Galaxia as "among the more dangerous (and scary) villains Sailor Moon and the Guardians have taken on, and nothing drives that home more than watching her casually kill off her own minions; seeing her dissolve someone in their friend's arms is horrific." She also says that the absence of several of the villains from the source manga, in particular Heavy Metal Papillon, "do rob the original ending of some of its weight vis á vis the projected future and Sailor Moon's ultimate power".

While reviewing Sailor Moon Cosmos, Michael S. Mammano from Den of Geek described Galaxia as a "a narcissistic nihilist bent on attaining godhood to destroy and remake the universe in her image". He also commented that "bringing in anime legend Megumi Hayashibara to voice Galaxia is perfect." Diane Darcy from CBR considered that Megumi Hayashibara "was miscast as Sailor Galaxia", since the character "is a role that demands a far more menacing presence than the one Hayashibara delivers". According to the author, "Galaxia would've benefited tremendously from rehiring her original voice actor, Mitsuko Horie" who "maximized the character's ruthless violence." Commeting on Galaxia herself, the author stated that the character "far outclasses the titular heroine's previous enemies in every regard." Rebecca Silverman from Anime News Network stated that Galaxia's ambition is a result of "the terrible circumstances she experienced before her awakening as a Sailor Guardian." While discussing a scene in which Galaxia is physically attacked by a group of unidentified men with swords, the author explained that there are "two potential interpretations of what happened to her: she certainly could have been subjected to an endless, painful cycle of death and rebirth, or the swords piercing her could be indicative of a past of sexual abuse and torment."

Kourtney Borman from CBR devoted an entire article to explain Chaos' influence over the course of the series, comparing its characteristics and actions to its previous incarnations: Metalia, Wiseman, Pharoh 90, and Nehelenia. According to the author, "Chaos' presence in the series resonates not just because it is the ultimate evil, but also because it represents real-world struggles. It represents depression, greed, fear, hatred–forces that can totally consume a person and even entire societies." She considered Galaxia's backstory "merely a parallel for other villains in the series–she's a tragic figure who fell victim to darkness in a moment of weakness." Borman concluded the article by stating Chaos is "not just the ultimate villain of Sailor Moon, but also one of the most profound antagonists in all fiction."
