= Ado Endoh =

Japanese actress

Ado Endo (遠藤 あど, Endō Ado; November 6, 1973) is a Japanese actress best known from her work on SeraMyu. She is the longest performing actress in the Sailor Moon musicals, portraying many background characters, such as Sailor Theta and Sailor Lead Crow.

== Musicals ==
- Sailor Moon S - Usagi Ai no Senshi e no Michi - Death Nightmare
- Sailor Moon S - Henshin - Super Senshi e no Michi - Death Nightmare
- Sailor Moon S - Henshin - Super Senshi e no Michi (Kaiteiban) - Death Nightmare
- Shin / Henshin - Super Senshi e no Michi - Last Dracul Jokyoku - Death Nightmare
- Sailor Moon SuperS - Yume Senshi - Ai - Eien ni... - Lemures
- Sailor Moon SuperS - Yume Senshi - Ai - Eien ni... Saturn Fukkatsu Hen! - Lemures
- Sailor Moon SuperS - Bishoujo Senshi Sailor Moon SuperS Special Musical Show - Lemures
- Sailor Moon Sailor Stars (musical) - Shadow Bug
- Sailor Moon Sailor Stars (Kaiteiban) - Sailor Theta
- Eien Densetsu - Sailor Theta
- Eien Densetsu (Kaiteiban) - The Final First Stage - Sailor Theta
- Shin Densetsu Kourin - Dark Moon
- Kaguya Shima Densetsu - Dark Menorah
- Kaguya Shima Densetsu (Kaiteiban) Natsuyasumi! Houseki Tankentai - Dark Menorah
- Kessen / Transylvania no Mori - Shin Toujou! Chibi Moon wo Mamoru Senshi-tachi - Demon Lilit
- Kessen / Transylvania no Mori (Kaiteiban) - Saikyou no Kataki Dark Cain no Nazo - Demon Lilit
- Chou Wakusei Death Vulcan no Fuuin - Roi Malkuth
- Tanjou! Ankoku no Princess Black Lady - Calaveras
- Tanjou! Ankoku no Princess Black Lady (Kaiteiban) - Wakusei Nemesis no Nazo - Calaveras
- 10th Anniversary Festival - Ai no Sanctuary - Dark Maya
- Mugen Gakuen - Mistress Labyrinth - Centi
- Mugen Gakuen - Mistress Labyrinth (Kaiteiban) - Centi
- Starlights - Ryuusei Densetsu - Sailor Lead Crow
- Kakyuu-Ouhi Kourin - The Second Stage Final - Sailor Lead Crow
- Shin Kaguya Shima Densetsu - Selkie
- Shin Kaguya Shima Densetsu (Kaiteiban) - Marinamoon Final - Selkie
