= Death Busters =

Group of fictional characters (Sailor Moon)

- The Death Busters. Left column, top to bottom: Mistress 9, Germatoid, Master Pharaoh 90. Center column: Professor Tomoe, Kaolinite. Right column, in both magical and civilian forms: Mimete, Eudial, Viluy, Tellu. Bottom: Cyprine and Ptilol.

Publication information
- Publisher: Kodansha
- First appearance: Sailor Moon chapter #27: Infinity 1 – Premonition (July 1994)
- Created by: Naoko Takeuchi

In-story information
- Base(s): Mugen Academy
- Leader(s): Professor Tomoe; Master Pharaoh 90
- Member(s): Kaolinite; Mistress 9 Witches 5 Daimons

The Death Busters (Japanese: デスバスターズ, Hepburn: Desu Basutāzu) are a group of fictional characters in the Sailor Moon manga series written by Naoko Takeuchi. This group comprises the villains of the third major story arc, which is called the Infinity in the manga, Sailor Moon S in the original anime adaptation, and Death Busters in Sailor Moon Crystal. They are first introduced in chapter #27 "Infinity 1 – Premonition", originally published in Japan on July 7, 1994. In the Cloverway English adaptation, they are called the "Heart Snatchers".

Originally from the "Tau Ceti Star System" in another dimension, the Death Busters acquire human host bodies to act through with Kaolinite and Professor Tomoe as acting leaders. Based in Mugen Academy (無限学園, Mugen Gakuen; Literally "Infinity Academy"), an elite high school built in the middle of Tokyo's Sankakusu District (三角州区, Sankakusu-ku; Literally "Delta District"), the Death Busters work to gather human souls which would prolong their dying homeworld. Their ultimate goal is the revival of their commander Mistress 9 so they can bring their master Pharaoh 90 to Earth and terraform it into a new home at the cost of the current life forms.

== Key figures ==
=== Professor Tomoe ===
Professor Souichi Tomoe (土萠 創一 教授, Tomoe Sōichi Kyōju) is the leader of the Death Busters and Hotaru Tomoe's father. A genetic scientist forced out of the scientific community for his unethical experiments, he sold his findings to companies and bought the entire Sankakusu District to continue his research to create "Super Beings". But a fire occurs in Tomoe's apartment that killed his wife Keiko and gravely wounded his daughter Hotaru. Tomoe saves his daughter by outfitting her body with cybernetic limbs during a freak storm that brought the Death Busters to Earth, the aliens apparently attracted to his darkness. Witnessing his assistant be reborn as Kaolinite, Tomoe sold his soul to Pharaoh 90 and willfully discarded his humanity by ingesting a Daimon Egg to become a hybrid as he began to build Mugen Academy while working to perfect the stability of Daimon/human hybrids. When Super Sailor Moon and the Outer Guardians arrive at his lab and dispatch his Daimon test subjects, Tomoe changes into his Daimon form Germatoid (ゲルマトイド, Gerumatoido). Sailor Moon is forced to kill him with her Rainbow Moon Heart Ache, Hotaru has briefly seen saying goodbye to her father while accepting that he died a long time ago after her mother's death.

In the original anime, Hotaru's injury and the Death Busters' arrival occur at the same time. Professor Tomoe's story is the same with the exception that he was forcefully possessed by Germatoid. Tomoe also survives the ordeal as Germatoid leaves his body and is destroyed by Sailor Uranus and Neptune, attempting to reach Hotaru. Following the final battle, Tomoe loses his memories as he is entrusted with his reborn daughter's care until the season premiere of Sailor Stars, when Setsuna Meioh comes to retrieve her, and after that, he is not seen again in the series.

Professor Tomoe appears in several musicals. In the Last Dracul arc, his body is possessed by an alchemist known as Undead Berserk (アンデッド・ベルセルク, Andeddo Beruseruku). Using Tomoe's laboratory, Berserk tries to create perfect homunculi in order to replace human beings; however, his first homunculi, the Death Mannetjes, turned out to be flawed creatures. Although Tomoe is possessed by Berserk, the latter shows concern for Hotaru. In Kessen / Transylvania no Mori (Kaiteiban) - Saikyou no Kataki Dark Cain no Nazo, the Amazoness Quartet, known as "Samael Quartet" in this revision, are homunculi created by Tomoe from Chibiusa's star seed.

Professor Tomoe is voiced by Akira Kamiya in Sailor Moon S and by Takuya Kirimoto in Crystal. In the Cloverway Inc. English adaptation produced in association with Optimum Productions, he is voiced by Jeff Lumby, and the Germatoid creatures are voiced by a range of actors including Tony Daniels, David Fraser, and Steven Bednarski. In the Viz Media English adaptation, he is voiced by Keith Silverstein. In the musicals, he has been portrayed by Shunsaku Yajima, Ryuuji Kasahara, Kaname Aoki, and Yuuki Kaon.

=== Kaolinite ===
Kaolinite (カオリナイト, Kaorinaito) is the Commander of the Witches 5 with the title of Magus (秘術師 / マグス, Magusu), named after the mineral of the same name. Originally Kaori Kuromine (黒峰カオリ, Kuromine Kaori), she was Tomoe's assistant before being infected with a Daimon Egg that consumes her humanity while pledging her loyalty to Pharaoh 90. Serving as Pharaoh 90's emissary, with access to Taioron Crystal, Kaolinite convinces Tomoe to offer himself and Hotaru to the Death Busters. Despite no longer being human, Kaolinite retained some of her former self like her infatuation with Tomoe. Posing as Mugen Academy's headmistress, communicating with Pharaoh 90 to relay his orders, Kaolinite directs the Witches 5 to deal with the Sailor Guardians and eventually take the Legendary Silver Crystal while also making attempts to prevent the awakening of Sailor Saturn whom she deemed a threat to her group. After the Witches 5 have all been killed and Mistress 9 had awakened, Kaolinite is given the task to kill the Sailor Guardians herself before the Outer Guardians intervene. This forces Kaolinite to assume her Daimon form prior to being destroyed by Super Sailor Moon's Rainbow Moon Heartache attack.

In the original anime adaptation, her role is changed to oversee the initial Death Buster attacks, Kaolinite seeks out the three Talismans to obtain the Legendary Holy Grail. Her Daimons having attacked Sailor Mars, Sailor Mercury, and Sailor Jupiter prior, Kaolinite targets Sailor Moon while deducing her identity and ends up appearing to fall to death from Tokyo Tower in the resulting battle. But Kaolinite survived, though she lost her memory and Tomoe placed her Hotaru's guardian. Kaolinite eventually regains her memories, stealing Chibiusa's Pure Heart to offer to Mistress 9 so she can win Tomoe's love. But Kaolinite, after Tomoe congratulated her, is killed off when she is thrown into an electrified wall by Mistress 9 for "having served her purpose".

The stage musicals follow the manga version, though no mention of what was occurring at the time of the lightning strike is made, and the event is not shown, only mentioned. The musicals imply Kaori to be her original name, as she is always addressed as Kaori-Kun in Hotaru's presence by Professor Tomoe who states she has been helping them out since, at least, his wife's death. In Usagi Ai no Senshi e no Michi, she leads another set of minions, the Death Nightmares.

In Sailor Moon S, she is voiced by Noriko Uemura. In Crystal, she is voiced by Hikari Yono. In the Cloverway Inc. English adaptation, her name is changed to Kaorinite (though she retains her original name in her second incarnation) and is voiced by Kirsten Bishop. In the Viz Media English adaptation, she is voiced by Tara Platt. In the musicals, Kaolinite is played by Keiko Hanayama, Mutsumi Fukuma, and Miki Kawasaki.

=== Mistress 9 ===
Mistress 9 (ミストレス9, Misutoresu Nain) is a malevolent extraterrestrial entity who is Pharaoh 90's main partner, sent to oversee her master's arrival to Earth with Tomoe implanting her Daimon Egg in the comatose body of Hotaru. But Mistress 9 did not fully awaken despite Hotaru having seizures while in the presence of a Taioron Crystal fragment, though Mistress 9 slowly becomes more active when exposed to the light of the Legendary Silver Crystal. After the Witches 5 have all been killed, her influence overwhelmed Hotaru as she force-grows her vessel into a woman with long hair. Mistress 9 steals Chibiusa's soul and Legendary Silver Crystal while using the latter as a replacement power source when she conducts the ritual to summon Pharaoh 90 to Earth. As Pharaoh 90 begins to manifest, Mistress 9 attempts to rip herself out of Hotaru's body to assume her true form. But Mistress 9 is surprised to find that Hotaru's soul still exists and is inhibiting the entity from leaving her body, managing to thwart her by forcing her to be paralyzed on the ground, so Hotaru has enough time to restore the souls of the Inner Guardians and Chibiusa to their bodies. Mistress 9, who turned into her true Daimon form and broke free of Hotaru's force, attempts to steal Sailor Moon's Silver Crystal before Sailor Chibi Moon arrives, Sailor Moon and Chibi Moon assume their Super forms to overwhelm Mistress 9. But when Pharaoh 90 fully manifests, Mistress 9 allows herself to be assimilated into her master with Sailor Saturn's spirit possessing Hotaru by later manifesting from what remained of Mistress 9.

In the original anime's third season, Mistress 9 (commonly mistaken for Sailor Saturn herself) makes her presence known early as she occasionally controls Hotaru to communicate with the other Death Busters, making Hotaru's eyes glow red and emit a red aura of pure evil, in contest to Sailor Saturn's light purplish one. But Mistress 9 fully awakens once obtaining Chibiusa's Pure Heart Crystal, killing Kaolinite for serving her purpose in her full revival. Mistress 9 attempts to use a large machine to guide Pharaoh 90 to Earth so that he may destroy it. Sailor Moon tries to stop her and Tomoe, now freed from Germatoid, attempts to reach her, still seeing her as Hotaru, and the vessel of Sailor Saturn; a fellow Sailor Guardian. She attacks both of them but is seriously injured by energy emanating from the machine. Professor Tomoe takes her in his arms and Hotaru's consciousness begins to respond. Mistress 9 attempts to subdue her once again but Hotaru's memories of both her father and of Chibiusa prove to be overpowering. It results in Hotaru awakening by merging with the spirit of Sailor Saturn within her, their combined strength destroying Mistress 9's dark essence for good.

In Sailor Moon S, Mistress 9's voice is provided by Yūko Minaguchi and Yukiyo Fujii provides her voice in Crystal. In the CWI English dub, she is voiced by Susan Aceron. In the Viz Media English dub, she is voiced by Christine Marie Cabanos. In the musicals, two actresses have played her: Tomoko Inami and Chinatsu Akiyama.

=== Master Pharaoh 90 ===
Master Pharaoh 90 (師(マスター)ファラオ90(ナインティ), Masutā Farao Nainti) is a malevolent interdimensional being from "Tau Ceti Star System", an amorphous being who is both the mastermind of the Death Busters and the originator of the Daimons. As the Taioron Crystal that he uses for substance is nearly spent with his domain on the verge of collapse, Pharaoh 90 uses the spatial distortions in Tokyo's Sankakusu district to send an advance guard of Daimon Eggs to make preparations for his coming. Pharaoh 90's goal is to assimilate Earth and terraform it into a new home for himself and his Daimon spawn. As his right-hand Mistress 9 was inactive at the time, Pharaoh 90 communicated with Kaolinite at the top of Mugen Academy as he senses both the Legendary Silver Crystal and an unawakened Sailor Saturn whom he expresses dread towards.

Mistress 9 retrieved Chibiusa's future Silver Crystal with Pharaoh deeming it as a replacement for the obsolete Taioron Crystal as he is brought to Earth via an established portal. Once on Earth, Sailor Moon describing his form as that of "black lava reeking of death", Pharaoh absorbs Mistress 9 while beginning to cover the entire Earth despite the Outer Guardians' attempts to contain him within Sankakusu. With Pharaoh 90 able to absorb their attacks, Sailor Moon attempted to sacrifice herself by unleashing the powers of the Legendary Holy Grail and the Silver Crystal while within the entity. But the gambit caused the Outer Guardians' Talismans to resonate and awaken Sailor Saturn, who uses her "Death Reborn Revolution" to weaken Pharaoh 90 but stayed her hand from killing him when Sailor Moon emerged unharmed. The dying Pharaoh 90 attempts to flee back into the Tau System as Saturn gives chase, having Sailor Pluto use her "Dark Dome Close" to seal the dimensional distortion and trap Pharaoh 90 within his dying world to destroy for good. Like all of the head villains in the manga, Pharaoh 90 is later revealed to be an incarnation of Chaos, the ultimate enemy of the series.

In Sailor Moon S, Pharaoh 90 appears as a huge, black eyeball-like sphere with tentacles who are simply acting on an impulse to destroy Earth and recruited Tomoe by providing him with Mistress 9's Daimon Egg. When a portal is opened by Mistress 9, Pharaoh 90 begins to surface before being destroyed by Super Sailor Moon (empowered by the other Guardians) and the newly awakened Sailor Saturn.

Pharaoh 90 is voiced by Takaya Hashi in Crystal, with Michael Sorich (in his first two appearances) and John Eric Bentley voicing him in the English version. Tony Daniels provides vocal effects in the Cloverway Inc. English adaptation.

== Witches 5 ==
The Witches 5 (ウィッチーズ5, Witchīzu Faibu) is a subset of the Death Busters led by Kaolinite. They are artificial human/Daimon hybrids created by Tomoe. The Witches 5 pose as Mugen Academy prefects while given the task to gather souls, or "Hostes," of the student body to both prolong the Tau Ceti Star System and provide vessels for Daimon Eggs. They are seen as either being equal to or stronger than the main Sailor Guardians, whom they target for their interference with the promise of being promoted to Magus level. Kaolinite would later revive the Witches 5 as Mugen Academy's first line of defense when the Sailor Guardians storm the school.

In the anime, the Witches 5 are led by Professor Tomoe while being at odds with Kaolinite. They work as researchers in an underground lab and compete amongst themselves for the professor's approval. They are first given the task to search for the Talismans until Eudial's death; the other members of the group are later instructed by Mistress 9 to find "pure hearts" instead. After a member of the group dies, her successor alters the "Witches 5" sign on the lab's door to reflect the number of remaining members. In the Cloverway English adaptation, the name of the group is changed to the "Bureau of Bad Behavior". (Note: In one episode of the Cloverway dub, Tomoe did refer to them as "Witches 5 Research", most likely in error caused by the dub script.)

=== Eudial ===
Eudial (ユージアル, Yūjiaru), named for the mineral Eudialyte, is the first member of the Witches 5 to appear. She is a red-haired humanoid with a rank of Level 78 and is able to use the "Fire Buster" flame torrent attack. Under the alias of Yuko Arimura (有村ゆうこ, Arimura Yūko), she is the Etiquette class prefect in charge of Mugen Academy's Philosophy division. Eudial uses her position to bring newly enrolled students to a mountain retreat on "Mount M" for an orientation that doubles as a ritual to extract their Hostes. While retaining her human form in Crystal, Eudial assumes her medusa-like Daimon form to overwhelm Sailors Mars and Jupiter when they interfere before being killed by Sailor Moon. When Kaolinite revives the Witches 5 for her curse against the Sailor Guardians, Eudial targets Mars's insecurities and later attacks Sailor Moon before destroyed by the Outer Guardians.

In the anime, Eudial seems to be the oldest of the group and is much resented by the others; particularly Mimete, because Professor Tomoe seems to favor her. She is referred to as Chief by the other members. Eudial is generally fairly even-tempered and level-headed; however, she is also portrayed as a reckless driver. A brilliant inventor, she is able to construct and jury rig weaponry and computer technology through the use of everyday items, like her deadly shoulder-mounted flamethrower, the Fire Buster, and later in the series booby-traps the under-construction Marine Cathedral. Eudial actually succeeds in getting two of the Talismans but loses them to Sailor Pluto. She uses the Fire Buster to try to attack Super Sailor Moon, but she deflects it back to her. Furious, she escapes in her car, only to find that Mimete has torn out its brakes and filled it with snails. The car crashes through a barrier into the sea below, killing her.

Voice actor Maria Kawamura provides her voice for the original Japanese production and Chiaki Takahashi voices her in Crystal. Canadian actress Loretta Jafelice does her voice for the Cloverway English adaptation, in which her name is changed to "Eugeal". In the Viz Media English adaptation, she is voiced by Erin Fitzgerald. In the musicals, she is played by Hitomi Tsumura and Saya Chinen.

=== Mimete ===
Mimete (ミメット, Mimetto) is the yellow-haired (Note: In the anime, her hair is orange.) member of the Witches 5 who is named after the mineral mimetite. She has a rank of Level 40 and is able to use the "Charm Buster" attack. (Note: In the Cloverway dub, this attack is named "Stage Fright".) Under the alias of Mimi Hanyu (羽生美々, Hanyū Mimi), she is a pop idol who is prefect of Mugen Academy's Arts Division. She uses her cover to hold a concert for Mugen Academy students to take their Hostes, having not expected Sailor Venus to be attending under the guise of a Mugen student. When the other Sailor Guardians arrive, Mimete is forced to fight them with support from Daimons created by some of the students. Despite her efforts, she ends up being killed by Sailor Uranus. When Kaolinite revives the Witches 5 for her curse against the Sailor Guardians, Mimete targets Venus through her fantasy and later attacks Sailor Moon before destroyed by the Outer Guardians.

In the anime adaptation, while ditzy and targeting celebrities, Mimete is assigned to collect Pure Heart Crystals after she orchestrated Eudial's death. Out of all the Witches 5, she is the least organized and the most easily distracted. She can launch mirages in the shape of stars at her opponents and induces severe vertigo and disorientation, capable of rendering someone unconscious in seconds. After several failed attempts at collecting hearts, she tries to use one of Eudial's abandoned inventions, the Witches Electric Warp, but Tellu exploits a design flaw in the machine to mercilessly imprison Mimete inside it.

In the '90s anime, she is voiced by Mika Kanai and in Crystal, she is voiced by Yuki Nagaku. Catherine Disher provides her voice in the Cloverway Inc. English adaptation, in which her name is spelled "Mimet". In the Viz Media English adaptation, she is voiced by Kira Buckland. In the musicals, she is played by Shiori Honda and Aki Kudou.

=== Viluy ===
Viluy (ビリユイ, Biriyui) is the white-haired member of the Witches 5 who is named after the mineral viluite. She has a rank of Level 202 and is able to use nano-machines to completely obliterate her enemy in her "Mosaic Buster" attack. She acts under the alias of Yui Bidoh (美堂ゆい, Bidō Yui), Mugen Academy's top student and prefect of the Computer Club who uses her nanomachines to turn computers into Hoste-sucking machines for the Mugen Prep School held in Mugen Academy. Viluy attempts to take Mercury's soul but ends up being killed by Sailor Uranus. When Kaolinite revives the Witches 5 for her curse against the Sailor Guardians, Viluy targets Mercury's insecurities and later attacks Sailor Moon before destroyed by the Outer Guardians.

In the anime, Viluy is handed the task of gathering pure hearts after Tellu's death. She collects the pure hearts from the students using a supercomputer, controlled by her wristband. She overpowers Sailors Mercury, Uranus, and Neptune using nanomachines controlled by her wristband. Sailor Moon damages Viluy's wristband and the Witch ends up being consumed when her Mosaic Buster rebounded on her.

Viluy also appears in the stage musicals. She is voiced by Yoshino Takamori in the original anime and by Rina Honnizumi in Crystal. In the Cloverway Inc. English adaptation, her names were changed to "Byruit" and "Julie Bidoh" and is voiced by Kim Bubbs. In the Viz Media English adaptation, she is voiced by Julie Ann Taylor (credited as Cricket Brown). In the musicals, she is played by Nao Futatsugi, Yuka Kuwahara, and Yui Hasegawa.

=== Tellu ===
Tellu (テルル, Teruru) is the green-haired member of the Witches 5 who is named after the mineral tellurite. She has a rank of Level 404 and is able to use the "Mandragora Buster" attack. She acts under the alias of Ruru Teruno (照野留々, Teruno Ruru) and is prefect of Mugen Academy's Physical Education class and Botanical Garden, providing a number of her artificial Telluns plants to the populace to absorb Hostes from their victims. Though her scheme is found out by the Sailor Guardians as they confront her, Tellu overpowers the Sailor Guardians before assuming her Daimon form to finish them off. But Tellu ends up being killed by a newly re-awakened Sailor Pluto. When Kaolinite revives the Witches 5 for her curse against the Sailor Guardians, Tellu targets Jupiter's insecurities and later attacks Sailor Moon before destroyed by the Outer Guardians.

In the original anime, after deposing of Mimete, Tellu's role is slightly different as she opens a flower shop to sale her Telluns before being confronted by Sailor Moon, Sailor Chibi Moon, Sailor Pluto, and Tuxedo Mask. When her Telluns being destroyed, Tellu mutates the last into a Hyper-Tellun to kill the group. But Tuxedo Mask hurls one of his roses at Tellu and causes her to lose the Pure Heart Crystals she gathered, resulting in her being attacked by her own creation. Tellu electrocutes the Hyper-Tellun in an attempt to break free, but it self-destructs and she is consumed in the explosion.

She was voiced by Chieko Honda until episodes 30 and 31 of Sailor Moon S. In Crystal, she is voiced by Naomi Ōzora. In the Cloverway Inc. English adaptation, her name is changed to "Telulu" and her silhouette appearance was played by Julie Lemieux. In the Viz Media English adaptation, she is voiced by Laura Post. In the musicals, she is played by Mio Nunokawa, Akiko Iwasaki and Momoko Sadachi.

=== Cyprine and Ptilol ===
Cyprine (シプリン, Shipurin) and Ptilol (プチロル, Puchiroru) are collectively the final members of the Witches 5 who are named after the minerals cyprine and clinoptilolite. They have a rank of Level 999 and are able to use the "Ribbon Buster" attack. In the Materials Collection, author Naoko Takeuchi states that Ptilol is an extension of Cyprine who normally resides within Cyprine's body until they split into two separate beings. The two are mirror-imaged with Cyprine having blue hair and eyes with a braid with a bun on top on the right side of her head and dresses in blue, while Ptilol has red hair and eyes, a braid with a bun on top on the left side of her head and dresses in red.

As prefect of Mugen Academy's business division and sorcery class, Cyprine is tasked by Kaolinite specifically to take care of Haruka and Michiru after the two revealed their true colors. While caught off guard that her quarry are Sailors, Cyprine uses her power to have all the Sailor Guardians save Sailor Moon turn on each other. While she and Ptilol split to dodge her initial attack on them, Sailor Moon manages to kill the twin witches after transforming into Super Sailor Moon and using her "Rainbow Moon Heartache" attack on them. When Kaolinite revives the Witches 5, Cyprine and Ptilol oversee the Sailor Guardians' ensnarement in their trap. After their teammates dealt with the other Sailor Guardians, the twins join the other Witches 5 in overwhelming Sailor Moon before they are all destroyed by the Outer Guardians.

In the anime, while still the last of the Witches 5, Cyprine's story is altered to have her make a final attempt of gathering Pure Hearts for Mistress 9's revival. When the Sailor Guardians interfere, she and Ptilol split and overwhelm the group with one twin blocking an attack aimed at the other and using the absorbed energy to counter while increasing their power. But the Sailors formulate a counter-strategy with Sailor Mercury using her Bubble spray to obscure the area so they can force Cyprine and Ptilol apart, tricking the two into blasting each other as both are killed when their staves are overloaded by the excess energy.

In Sailor Moon S, Yuriko Fuchizaki did the voice of Cyprine and Rumi Kasahara did the voice of Ptilol. In Crystal, they are both voiced by Umeka Shōji. In the Cloverway Inc. English version, their names are changed to "Cyprin" and "Petirol". They are voiced by Naomi Emmerson and Sara Sahr. In the Viz Media English adaptations, they are both voiced by Dorothy Elias-Fahn. In the musicals, only Cyprine has made an appearance, and she is played by Michiho Matsumoto, Saeri Amano, and Maana.

== Servants ==
=== Death Mannetjes ===
The Death Mannetjes (デス・マネッチャーズ, Desu Manecchāzu) are servants of Professor Tomoe in the musicals Usagi Ai no Senshi e no Michi, Henshin - Super Senshi e no Michi, and its revision. They are four men portrayed as thinking highly of themselves and as masters of disguise. The Mannetjes are tasked with finding the talismans and are rivals of Kaolinite's own set of minions: the Death Nightmares. They are killed by the Sailor Guardians but are revived by Sailor Moon at the end of the musical. Their leader is Death Ra, and other members include Death Ri, Death Ru, and Death Debu Re. They are respectively played by Ryuuji Kasahara, Masakazu Idono, Masayuki Ozaki, and Kouhei Kowada.

The Death Mannetjes appear in the Last Dracul musical. They are homunculi created by Undead Berserk while he takes over Tomoe's body and laboratory. They have no relation to the Death Busters in this version. The Mannetjes have different names in this continuity: Death Pa, Death Pi, Death Pu, and Death Pe. They are respectively portrayed by Jun Kanzaki, Seiko Takuma, Takashi Kashiwagi, and Yoshiya Yukimura.

=== Death Nightmares ===
The Death Nightmares (デス・ナイトメア, Desu Naitomea) are nameless servants of Kaolinite in the musical Usagi Ai no Senshi e no Michi. They are portrayed as beautiful, seductive women with silver hair, and have a rivalry with the Death Mannetjes in the heart snatching. They use a Daimon named Gondola to steal Chibiusa's pure crystal heart, but they are stopped by Sailors Uranus and Neptune, and later killed by the Guardians, only to be revived by Sailor Moon at the end of the musical. They are played by Kaori Ishikawa, Ado Endoh, Yuuko Matsumoto, Eri Ikemoto, Hisako Doubayashi, Yoshiko Nakahara, and Junko Oyama.

In the Last Dracul musical, they are female dream demons, appearing again as beautiful and seductive women but with dark hair. Some of them are named in this arc: Olam Tiphareth, Roi Malkuth, and Elyon Yesod; however, there are other unnamed members. They have no relation to the Death Busters in this version; since Kaolinite does not appear in this musical, their leader is Undead Berserk's right-hand woman, Death Lamia (デス・ラミアー, Desu Ramia). The Last Dracul Death Nightmares are portrayed by Miki Kawasaki, Ado Endoh, Noriko Yamakawa, Junko Yamauchi, and Izumi Ogino.

== Daimons ==
Daimons (ダイモーン, Daimōn) are amorphous monsters deployed by the Death Busters to carry out several tasks, normally used as their enforcers. Being a form of life native to the Tau System, the Daimons that manifest on Earth as special pods called Daimon Eggs which need to assimilate host bodies in a process called Vesselization to survive the planet's conditions, both Kaolinite and a willing Tomoe being such examples of the hybridization. But when Tomoe attempted to replicate the process he used to create the Witches 5, a process that combines genetic manipulation and cybernetic modification, the result is malformed Atavized worm creatures which the others called failed experiments despite Tomoe's opinion of the monsters. When defeated, humans recently turned into Daimons revert to their original state while the Daimon Egg shatters upon being ejected.

In the original anime, the Daimons serve as monsters-of-the-day. Appearing as red feminine liquid humanoids in their natural state, the Daimons are artificially created by Tomoe and Vesselize objects to assume personalized form. The first batch of Daimon Eggs used by Kaolinite was allowed to randomly enter objects on their whim and possess a Death Buster mark somewhere on their bodies that allows them to extract a Heart Crystal from their target. When Eudial takes over search for the Talismans, Tomoe built a specialized oven to create fixed Vesselizations with the resulting Daimons created as bodyguards for the witch. The final batch of Daimons, combining the roles of the previous two with the task to revive Mistress 9, are created by Tomoe to aid Mimete and are modified with cormorant traits so they can suck out a Heart Crystal by simply kissing their prey. When defeated, the object reverts to its original state with the Daimon Egg destroyed in the process releasing the bird-formed evil spirits and in most cases, the Heart Crystal returns to its rightful owner. After the remaining Witches 5 have all been killed, the remaining Daimon Eggs all hatched and serve as a barrier to prevent the Sailor Guardians from entering Mugen Academy. After the final battle, one Daimon survived and Vesselized with the oven to become Renji, who acts on her instincts as a Daimon to gather Hearts and attacks the city until the Sailor Guardians stop her, destroying both her and the oven. In the video games Sailor Moon S: Quiz Taiketsu! Sailor Power Ketsushuu and Sailor Moon S - Kotaete Moon Call, Tomoe creates a Daimon named Quiz (クイーズ, Kuīzu), who resurrects Monsters, Droids, and Daimons from the first three seasons of the anime. In the former video game, the player must beat five quizzes in order to defeat these enemies and to make it to the final challenge to confront Quiz.

The musicals also portray them as using human hosts but have more in common in appearance with the anime version.

== Reception ==
Writer Rebecca Silverman reviewed the first part of the Sailor Moon S English dubbed blu-ray for Anime News Network and considered that Keith Silverstein seemed to have fun while dubbing Professor Tomoe and thought he found "a very good balance between insane and evil." Silverman also noted the increased sexuality of Kaolinite's Daimons. On a later review of the second part, Silverman regrets the producers did not devote enough time to develop Tellu, Viluy, Cyprine, and Ptilol, as they spent too much time on Mimete. However, she praised Kira Buckland's voice acting as Mimete, and positively compared her to Mika Kanai.

In his review of the third-season finale of Sailor Moon Crystal in Den of Geek, writer Michael S. Mammano noted that Master Pharaoh 90 is the first of the major antagonists to beg for his life: "We've seen rage, denial, despair, but never begging. I'm not sure if that makes Pharaoh 90 pathetic or Pluto and Saturn just that much cooler. Perhaps both?" Raphael Brown from CBR named the Witches 5 as "some of the most formidable enemies the Sailor Guardians have faced up to this point" since "it would take multiple Sailor Guardians to work together to defeat one of the five members". Brown also made comparisons between the Crystal portrayal of Professor Tomoe and that of the original anime adaptation, explaing that in the latter some comic elements were added to the character, while in the former he is irredeemable and "a detestable figure throughout the arc". Chloé McCormick from CBR described the Witches 5 as "some of the most well-remembered villains in Sailor Moon history, with Mimete and Eudial being popular characters" up to the publication of the article in April 2025. McCormick also drew differences between the Crystal Professor Tomoe and the original anime one: in the former, he has become consumed by his greed of knowledge and power to the point that not even Hotaru can recognize him, while in the latter he deeply cares for his daughter.
