= Sailor Moon Sailor Stars =

Fifth and final season of the Sailor Moon anime series

- Season 5
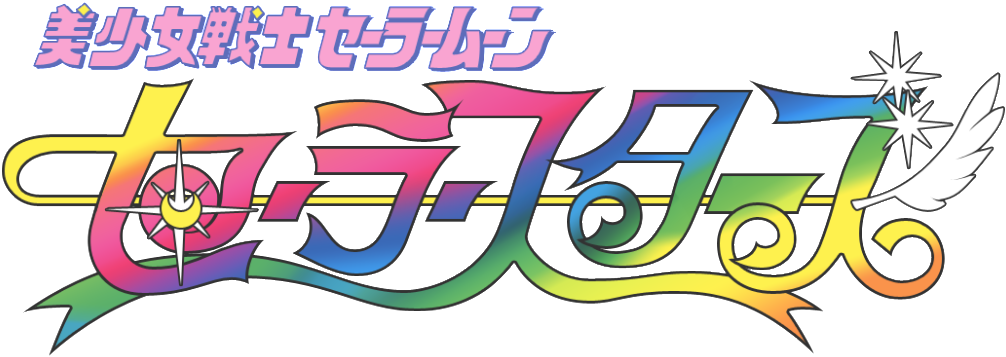
- The Japanese logo for the fifth season, originally translating to Pretty Soldier Sailor Moon: Sailor Stars
- No. of episodes: 34

Release
- Original network: TV Asahi
- Original release: March 9, 1996 – February 8, 1997

Season chronology
- ← Previous; Sailor Moon SuperS

The fifth and final season of the Sailor Moon anime series, Sailor Moon Sailor Stars, (Note: Originally released in Japan as Pretty Soldier Sailor Moon: Sailor Stars (美少女戦士セーラームーンセーラースターズ, Bishōjo Senshi Sērā Mūn Sērā Sutāzu), and later as Pretty Guardian Sailor Moon: Sailor Stars.) was produced by Toei Animation and directed by Takuya Igarashi. It premiered on TV Asahi on March 9, 1996, and ended on February 8, 1997, lasting 34 episodes. Toei later released the season on DVD in six compilations of five episodes between September 26 and November 21, 2005.

Sailor Stars consists of two story arcs. The first six episodes are an original arc in which the Sailor Guardians encounter Queen Nehelenia once again. The remaining episodes adapt the "Stars" arc of the Sailor Moon manga series by Naoko Takeuchi, in which the Sailor Guardians meet up with the Sailor Starlights, led by Princess Kakyuu. They discover that Sailor Galaxia, leader of the Shadow Galactica organization and a corrupted Sailor Guardian, plans to increase her powers and rule the Milky Way.

Sailor Stars was excluded from the initial English-language broadcast of Sailor Moon in the 1990s and early 2000s. In May 2014, Viz Media announced they had licensed the entire Sailor Moon series, including Sailor Stars, for an updated English release produced by Studiopolis. The first episode of Sailor Stars streamed on Hulu in the United States on December 14, 2015, followed by a streaming release of the entire series on Tubi TV in Canada on July 15, 2016. The first 17 episodes of Sailor Stars were released on Blu-ray and DVD in a bilingual format on June 18, 2019. The following 17 episodes were released on November 12, 2019.

Three pieces of theme music were used: one opening theme and two ending themes. The opening theme, "Sailor Star Song", is performed by Kae Hanazawa, while the ending theme for the first 33 episodes, "Kaze mo Sora mo Kitto...", is performed by Alisa Mizuki. The series finale uses the long-time opening theme of the anime, "Moonlight Densetsu" (performed by MoonLips), as its ending theme.

== Episodes ==
No. overall	No. in season	Title	Directed by	Written by	Art director(s)	Animation director(s)	Original release date	Japanese viewers (percentage)
Resurrection of Nehelenia Arc
167	1	"The Flower of Nightmares Scatters! The Queen of Darkness Returns"; Transliteration: "Akumu hana wo chirasu toki! Yami no Joō fukkatsu" (Japanese: 悪夢花を散らす時!闇の女王復活)	Takuya Igarashi	Ryōta Yamaguchi	Kenichi Tajiri	Katsumi Tamegai	March 9, 1996	12.7
Setsuna Meiou comes to take baby Hotaru from Professor Tomoe. Meanwhile, as Chibiusa prepares to go back to the future with Diana, a mysterious presence releases Queen Nehelenia from her mirror, who learns of Super Sailor Moon and Super Sailor Chibi Moon's survival as she sends glass fragments from her broken dream-mirror to Earth. One of the broken shards falls in Mamoru Chiba's eye, while the disturbance interferes with Chibiusa's attempts to go back to the future. Meanwhile, Sailor Neptune and Sailor Uranus fight glass monsters that appear from the fragments. Sailor Pluto arrives with baby Hotaru, who gives Uranus, Neptune and Pluto enough strength and energy to evolve into their stronger Super forms, like the rest. After the battle, Hotaru suddenly starts aging into a five-year-old (due to Sailor Saturn's influence from her sudden stiring from within her reincarnation) and gives a warning of a revolution that will put the Moon Princess in danger.
168	2	"Saturn Awakens! The Ten Sailor Guardians Unite"; Transliteration: "Satān no mezame! Sērā Jū Senshi shūketsu" (Japanese: サターンの目覚め!S10戦士集結)	Harume Kosaka	Genki Yoshimura	Kenichi Tajiri	Shigetaka Kiyoyama	March 23, 1996	10.6
Mamoru begins to act strangely, and Usagi becomes worried. Hotaru continues to grow both in body and mind, and a visit from her alter ego, Sailor Saturn herself, awakens Hotaru to her past experiences before her rebirth. Having become one with Super Sailor Saturn herself, and along with her fellow Outer Super Sailor Guardians, she tries to warn Super Sailor Moon of the danger she is in. Super Sailor Moon becomes Eternal Sailor Moon for the first time with the aid of the nine Super Sailor Guardians' combined abilities; her Crisis Moon Compact temporarily turns into the gold Eternal Moon Article. With this new and far more powerful form, she is able to destroy the mirror monsters with the Eternal Tiare, which evolved from the Kaleido Moon Scope. Back in his apartment, Mamoru is gradually being influenced by the mirror fragment.
169	3	"The Cursed Mirror! Mamoru Caught in a Nightmare"; Transliteration: "Noroi no makyō! Akumu ni torawareta Mamoru" (Japanese: 呪いの魔鏡!悪夢にとらわれた衛)	Noriyo Sasaki	Genki Yoshimura	Minoru Ōkōchi	Minako Itō	April 13, 1996	8.9
People all around Tokyo, including Mamoru, become entranced by mirrors. Usagi remembers a shadow she saw in Mamoru's mirror, and races off with the other Super Sailor Guardians to find him. Just as she identifies that the shadow was none other than Queen Nehelenia, the jealous queen of nightmares drags Mamoru into her mirror world as Super Sailor Moon is forced to watch helplessly.
170	4	"Night of Destiny! The Sailor Guardians' Ordeals"; Transliteration: "Unmei no ichiya! Sērā Senshi no kunan" (Japanese: 運命の一夜!セーラー戦士の苦難)	Yuji Endo	Ryōta Yamaguchi	Kazuyuki Hashimoto	Masahiro Andō	April 20, 1996	7.2
Mamoru gets taken through a mirror, and causes a time paradox; if Mamoru does not escape from Queen Nehelenia's curse, Chibiusa's existence will disappear. Usagi's feelings fury and resolve to save her beloved lets her evolve into her Eternal form at one point and follows Mamoru against her friends' wishes. The nine Super Sailor Guardians teleport to Queen Nehelenia's world to find Usagi, but end up getting separated. Super Sailor Mercury and Super Sailor Uranus form a team and attempt to defeat Nehelenia, but their opponent, revealed as a clone, traps them in mirrors. The episode ends with Super Sailor Mars and Super Sailor Neptune also caught in a trap of purple fire.
171	5	"For Love! The Endless Battle in the Dark World"; Transliteration: "Ai yue ni! Hateshinaki makai no tatakai" (Japanese: 愛ゆえに!果てしなき魔界の戦い)	Hiroki Shibata	Ryōta Yamaguchi	Kenichi Tajiri	Takayuki Gorai	April 27, 1996	9.2
Super Sailor Mars and Super Sailor Neptune battle against another clone of Nehelenia, but after an exhaustive battle, they faint and get captured by Queen Nehelenia. Meanwhile, Super Sailor Pluto and Super Sailor Venus also fall into captivity, while Super Sailor Jupiter sacrifices herself to save Usagi, who fell under Queen Nehelenia's hypnosis. One of Jupiter's rose earrings remains behind, and as Usagi looks at it, she remembers Tuxedo Mask. The hypnosis is broken, and Usagi makes her way through the final barrier to Queen Nehelenia's castle, which is a stairway covered in thorns.
172	6	"Moon Power of Love! The Nightmare Ends"; Transliteration: "Ai no mūn pawā! Akumu no owaru toki" (Japanese: 愛のムーンパワー!悪夢の終わる時)	Junichi Sato	Ryōta Yamaguchi	Kenichi Tajiri	Miho Shimogasa	May 4, 1996	7.5
As the only Super Sailor Guardians left standing, Super Sailor Chibi Moon and Super Sailor Saturn face Queen Nehelenia. Out of options, Hotaru attempts to use her immensely powerful Silence Glaive Surprise attack to put an end to Queen Nehelenia and her curse of nightmares at the cost of her and Super Sailor Saturn's life, but Super Sailor Chibi Moon stops her, as she does not want her best friend to perish in the attempt. Usagi finally arrives in time to see Chibiusa disappear as the curse progresses further. When the nine Super Sailor Guardians' combined power gives Usagi the ability to become Eternal Sailor Moon permanently, Queen Nehelenia reveals that she experienced a lonely childhood, but that the mirror kept her company. Usagi's pity breaks the curse over Mamoru. Chibiusa returns, all of the other Super Sailor Guardians are released, and the vast powers of Eternal Sailor Moon's Eternal Tiare returns the queen to her childhood to start anew.
Sailor Galaxia Arc
173	7	"Farewells and Encounters! The Transitioning Stars of Destiny"; Transliteration: "Wakare to deai! Unmei no hoshiboshi no ryūten" (Japanese: 別れと出会い!運命の星々の流転)	Takuya Igarashi	Ryōta Yamaguchi	Kenichi Tajiri	Yoshihiro Kitano	May 11, 1996	10.5
Leaving for New York City to study abroad in America, Mamoru gives Usagi an engagement ring. Chibiusa and Diana return to the future. While Mamoru is about to leave, three new popular idols named the Three Lights appear. A new enemy, going by Sailor Iron Mouse, extracts a woman's blank Star Seed, but Eternal Sailor Moon appears to stop her. However, the woman who had her Star Seed extracted, transforms into a Phage, a comical and monstrous form of a human once their Star Seed is exposed and allowed to turn black, lacking a true shine. A group of three mysterious Sailor Guardians, named the Sailor Starlights, said that it is impossible to turn a human back to its original form after they become a Phage except by the power of "that person." However, Eternal Sailor Moon is able to turn the woman back to normal with the Eternal Tiare's attack of Starlight Honeymoon Therapy Kiss.
174	8	"A School Storm! The Transfer Students Are Idols"; Transliteration: "Gakuen ni fuku arashi! Tenkōsei wa aidoru" (Japanese: 学園に吹く嵐!転校生はアイドル)	Harume Kosaka	Kazuhiko Kanbe	Kenichi Tajiri	Minako Itō	May 18, 1996	8.5
The Three Lights arrive at Usagi's high school as new students. They want to join a club, and one of them, Seiya Kou, joins the American Football Team and meets the captain, Kayama. Sailor Iron Mouse turns Kayama into a Phage. The Sailor Starlights show up again, and the four Inner Guardians meet them.
175	9	"Becoming an Idol! Minako's Ambition"; Transliteration: "Aidoru wo mezase! Minako no yabō" (Japanese: アイドルをめざせ!美奈子の野望)	Yuji Endo	Atsushi Maekawa	Kazuyuki Hashimoto	Takayuki Gorai	May 25, 1996	8.2
Minako aims to jump-start her idol career by becoming the Three Lights' personal assistant. Meanwhile, Iron Mouse sets her sights on a pushy hot-shot photographer.
176	10	"Fighter's Secret Identity! The Shocking Super Transformation"; Transliteration: "Faitā no shōtai! Shōgeki no chōhenshin" (Japanese: ファイターの正体!衝撃の超変身)	Noriyo Sasaki	Ryōta Yamaguchi	Kazuhisa Asai	Miho Shimogasa	June 8, 1996	9.9
The Three Lights practice for an upcoming dance-musical, with a harsh female director who holds down another job as a nun in Rei's school. Seiya, especially, does not get along with her. Iron Mouse selects this woman as her new target, and Seiya transforms into Sailor Star Fighter alone to try and stop her. Super Sailor Mars and Eternal Sailor Moon convince Seiya not to kill her.
177	11	"A Star of Dreams and Wishes! Taiki's Transformation"; Transliteration: "Hoshi ni takusu yume to roman! Taiki no henshin" (Japanese: 星に託す夢とロマン!大気の変身)	Hiroki Shibata	Kazuhiko Kanbe	Kenichi Tajiri	Shigetaka Kiyoyama	June 15, 1996	9.5
Professor Amanogawa, who is also Ami's sensei at the Guardians' high school, anticipates the return of a comet visible from Earth. Ami, who is excited about it, invites Taiki Kou of the Three Lights but he tells her the weather forecast is 100% rain, stating that the comet will not be seen before Taiki leaves. Ami tells him that she believes that they will be able to see the comet. The next day it begins to rain, and it looks bad for viewing of the comet. Meanwhile, Sailor Iron Mouse attacks Amanogawa, turning him into a Phage who starts attacking Ami, and Taiki after thinking about what Ami said decides to go once he gets there he hears Ami scream, he transforms into Sailor Star Maker to battle him. Amanogawa is turned back to normal and the sky clears up, allowing for clear viewing of the comet.
178	12	"Luna's Discovery: The Real Face of Yaten"; Transliteration: "Luna wa mita!? Aidoru Yaten no sugao" (Japanese: ルナは見た!?アイドル夜天の素顔)	Harume Kosaka	Ryōta Yamaguchi	Kenichi Tajiri	Yoshihiro Kitano	June 22, 1996	7.4
Seiya signs the Three Lights up for a TV program about pop idols and their pets, but a Chameleon they had ready for the show runs away. Luna does not stay far, however, and Yaten Kou takes her in, not knowing that she belongs to Usagi. Yaten bonds with Luna, while the Super Sailor Guardians try to find out Luna's purposes. Yaten's transformation into Sailor Star Healer appears for the first time.
179	13	"Friend or Foe? Star Lights and the Sailor Guardians"; Transliteration: "Teki? Mikata? Sutāraitsu to Sērā Senshi" (Japanese: 敵?味方?スターライツとS戦士)	Yuji Endo	Genki Yoshimura	Kenichi Tajiri	Minako Itō	June 29, 1996	8.4
Taiki runs into Makoto in the school greenhouse and asks her to come and cook with him on a TV program. Usagi volunteers to serve as Makoto's assistant and makes a mess of things, while the head chef of the program turns into a Phage. Taiki laughs for the very first time in years.
180	14	"Calling of the Shining Stars: Enter Haruka and Michiru"; Transliteration: "Yobiau hoshi no kagayaki! Haruka-tachi sansen" (Japanese: 呼び合う星の輝き!はるか達参戦)	Takuya Igarashi	Atsushi Maekawa	Kazuyuki Hashimoto	Katsumi Tamegai	July 13, 1996	6.2
The Three Lights and Michiru plan a joint concert, and the Super Sailor Guardians want to obtain tickets. After the concert, Seiya and Michiru romantically flirt. Haruka and Seiya openly disagree with each other. Sailor Iron Mouse attacks a famous conductor.
181	15	"Seiya and Usagi's Heart-Pounding Date"; Transliteration: "Seiya to Usagi no dokidoki dēto" (Japanese: セイヤとうさぎのドキドキデート)	Junichi Sato	Kazuhiko Kanbe	Kenichi Tajiri	Miho Shimogasa	July 20, 1996	4.2
Seiya and Usagi go on a romantic date. They spend the day at an amusement park and go dancing, which causes Usagi some discomfort. Sailor Iron Mouse targets Seiya, forcing him to transform into Sailor Star Fighter. Usagi, having transformed into Eternal Sailor Moon, arrives on the scene and notices the pin Seiya won as a prize on the ground. She questions the Starlights about his disappearance. Iron Mouse, having seen the transformation, threatens to reveal Seiya's identity. Before she can do so, however, Sailor Galaxia, the leader of the Sailor Animamates, appears and removes Iron Mouse's bracelets, causing her death.
182	16	"Invaders from Outer Space: The Coming of Siren"; Transliteration: "Uchū kara no shinryaku! Seirēn hirai" (Japanese: 宇宙からの侵略!セイレーン飛来)	Noriyo Sasaki	Ryōta Yamaguchi	Kazuhisa Asai	Shigetaka Kiyoyama	August 3, 1996	6.0
Galaxia's new henchwomen, Sailor Aluminium Siren and Sailor Lead Crow, take up Sailor Iron Mouse's task. Usagi finds a strange little girl, whom she tries to talk with. The girl, who apparently can only say "Chibi," then runs off. She later appears at Usagi's home, Ikuko Tsukino now declaring her Usagi's sister. After a search for a lost Chibi Chibi, Sailor Aluminium Siren changes a chief of police into a Phage. Usagi and Setsuna now have to face this new enemy.
183	17	"The Screaming Dead: Terror of the Camp Monster"; Transliteration: "Shiryō no sakebi? Kyōfu kyampu no kaijin" (Japanese: 死霊の叫び!?恐怖キャンプの怪人)	Hiroki Shibata	Kazuhiko Kanbe	Kenichi Tajiri	Yoshihiro Kitano	August 10, 1996	7.4
Sailor Aluminum Seiren attacks an unidentified man. Usagi and the others travel to a lake, and Rei reveals that her first cousin, Kengo Ibuki, a ceramic artist, lives nearby. The Three Lights have come to the same lake to film a horror movie. A monster appears and ravages Usagi's camp, causing Usagi and Rei to transform while the rest scatter. The monster's dialogue and the way he reacts to a pendant Rei reveals him as Rei's first cousin, Kengo, turned Phage.
184	18	"A Night Alone Together: Usagi in Danger"; Transliteration: "Futarikiri no yoru! Usagi no pinchi" (Japanese: ふたりきりの夜!うさぎのピンチ)	Harume Kosaka	Ryōta Yamaguchi	Hidekazu Nakanishi	Minako Itō	August 17, 1996	5.1
Upon learning that Usagi will spend the night alone, Seiya offers to sleep over and protect her. Before Seiya can reveal his secret identity as Sailor Star Fighter, Chibi Chibi interrupts. All the Super Sailor Guardians (except Pluto and Saturn) as well as Taiki and Yaten "happen" to come by, and a pushy news reporter for a television show, gets turned into a Phage inside Usagi's house.
185	19	"Taiki's Song Filled with Passion and Faith"; Transliteration: "Taiki zesshō! Shinjiru kokoro wo uta ni komete" (Japanese: 大気絶唱!信じる心を歌にこめて)	Yuji Endo	Atsushi Maekawa	Kenichi Tajiri	Katsumi Tamegai	August 31, 1996	7.6
A young girl named Misa lies in the hospital (that Ami's mom works at) suffering from a dangerous and almost incurable illness. Misa is a huge fan of the Three Lights, Ami tells Usagi about it who decides to bring Taiki as a present and when Taiki comes to greet her, the drawing she makes looks just like a mysterious Princess the Starlights are searching for. A doctor from America comes to perform Misa's operation, turns into a Phage, but is transformed back and successfully completes Misa's surgery.
186	20	"Chibi-Chibi's Mystery: The Big Noisy Chase"; Transliteration: "Chibichibi no nazo! Osawagase daitsuiseki" (Japanese: ちびちびの謎!おさわがせ大追跡)	Masahiro Hosoda	Genki Yoshimura	Kazuyuki Hashimoto	Michiaki Sugimoto	September 7, 1996	7.9
Chibi Chibi comes home with a bag of candy, and Usagi wonders where she got it. Usagi follows her when she goes out again, believing that she has gone to visit a "world of sweets." She loses track of Chibi Chibi, only to find her again in an extravagant mansion with a very rich man, who is turned into a Phage. Usagi soon believes she and Chibi-Chibi are somehow alike.
187	21	"The Shining Power of a Star: Chibi-Chibi's Transformation"; Transliteration: "Kagayaku hoshi no pawā! Chibichibi no henshin" (Japanese: 輝く星のパワー!ちびちびの変身)	Takuya Igarashi	Ryōta Yamaguchi	Kenichi Tajiri	Miho Shimogasa	September 14, 1996	8.4
The founding member of the Three Lights Fan-club notices Usagi's familiarity with the Three Lights and challenges her to a game of softball. She must win to continue associating with Seiya. After Seiya trains Usagi, the game starts. Before the final inning, Sailor Lead Crow attacks the opposing team's captain. Usagi transforms to save her, but Sailor Aluminium Siren sees her, decides that Usagi holds the true Star Seed, and attacks her. Chibi Chibi appears as a Sailor Guardian, providing the new power for a much stronger and more powerful attack, Silver Moon Crystal Power Kiss, Eternal Sailor Moon uses to defeat the phage. Later, Usagi makes the game-winning catch.
188	22	"Invitation to Terror: Usagi's Night Flight"; Transliteration: "Kyōfu e no shōtai! Usagi no yakan hikō" (Japanese: 恐怖への招待!うさぎの夜間飛行)	Noriyo Sasaki	Kazuhiko Kanbe	Hidekazu Nakanishi	Shigetaka Kiyoyama	October 12, 1996	7.4
Ami, Rei, Makoto, and Minako all have tickets to board a fan-club flight with the Three Lights. Jealous at missing out on all the fun, Usagi sadly walks back home to find a letter addressed to Eternal Sailor Moon from Sailor Aluminium Siren. Realizing that the flight is actually a trap, Usagi is desperate to save her friends. The four Inner Guardians and the three Starlights are forced to reveal their identities to each other, and Sailor Aluminium Siren is killed for not finding a real Star Seed.
189	23	"Duty or Friendship: Conflict Between the Sailor Guardians"; Transliteration: "Shimei to yūjō no hazama! Sērā Senshi-tachi no tairitsu" (Japanese: 使命と友情の間!S戦士達の対立)	Harume Kosaka	Genki Yoshimura	Kazuhisa Asai	Minako Itō	October 19, 1996	7.9
Usagi feels torn between the Three Lights as her friends and as Guardians. Yaten and Taiki urge Seiya to stay away from Usagi, and a local DJ gets turned into a Phage. Eternal Sailor Moon defeats him, but Sailor Tin Nyanko makes a sneak-attack on her with a paw-shaped blaster. Seiya jumps in and takes the blast for Eternal Sailor Moon, which causes him great pain. Sailor Star Healer and Sailor Star Maker show up, and cruelly tell the Super Sailor Guardians to stay away from them.
190	24	"Truth Revealed! The Star Lights' Past"; Transliteration: "Akasareta shinjitsu! Seiya-tachi no kako" (Japanese: 明かされた真実!セイヤ達の過去)	Hiroki Shibata	Atsushi Maekawa	Kenichi Tajiri	Katsumi Tamegai	October 26, 1996	7.7
The Outer Guardians, Sailor Uranus, Sailor Neptune and Sailor Pluto and the Sailor Starlights reveal their identities to each other. Seiya tells them he will not see Usagi any more. Usagi tries to get in contact with Seiya, despite opposition from the Outer Guardians and the other Starlights. Seiya secretly invites Usagi to an upcoming concert, where his song reveals to Usagi his past. Galaxia destroyed their home world Kinmoku and so many others. Their princess escaped, they followed behind her, and are now searching for her in the form of their song. Seiya, still not fully recovered after his injury, faints from exhaustion after singing. The manager of the concert is turned into a Phage.
191	25	"Butterflies of Light: A New Chapter on the Horizon"; Transliteration: "Hikari no chō ga mau toki! Atarashī nami no yokan" (Japanese: 光の蝶が舞う時!新しい波の予感)	Masahiro Hosoda	Ryōta Yamaguchi	Kazuyuki Hashimoto	Michiaki Sugimoto	November 9, 1996	9.0
Ami, Rei, Makoto, and Minako, go to a game-event in order to get closer to Taiki and talk to him about Seiya and Usagi. When the games begin, Rei, Makoto and Minako lose, which ends up leaving Ami to win. A woman is turned into a Phage and the Sailor Guardians are forced to fight it until Usagi arrives.
192	26	"Go for your Dream! Minako Becomes an Idol?!"; Transliteration: "Yume icchokusen! Aidoru Minako no tanjō!?" (Japanese: 夢一直線!アイドル美奈子の誕生!)	Yuji Endo	Kazuhiko Kanbe	Hidekazu Nakanishi	Shigetaka Kiyoyama	November 16, 1996	8.3
Minako has tried out in an idol competition judged by Yaten and has reached the final round. Sailor Tin Nyanko, in disguise, is also judging. Everyone keep telling her not to forget her "real dream" outside of her duties. One of the judges is turned into a phage. Yaten begins to understand the Guardians more now, and also gets closer to Minako. Minako passes the final round, but decides being with her best friends is more important now.
193	27	"The Stolen Silver Crystal: Princess Kakyu Appears"; Transliteration: "Ubawareta ginzuishō! Kakyū Purinsesu shutsugen" (Japanese: うばわれた銀水晶!火球皇女出現)	Takuya Igarashi	Ryōta Yamaguchi	Kazuhisa Asai	Miho Shimogasa	November 30, 1996	7.5
Preparations for the school's festival are moving in. Usagi invites Seiya over, but Yaten and Taiki interrupt upon discovering Chibi Chibi has their princess' incense burner. Sailor Lead Crow, thanks to a diary that Sailor Aluminium Siren had left behind, identified Usagi and the others as Sailor Guardians, and confronts her at the local school festival. Sailor Lead Crow threatens the lives of bystanders with a black hole. Usagi allows her silver Star Seed to be taken, but Sailor Tin Nyanko attacks Sailor Lead Crow, who drops the black hole, gets sucked in, and dies. Usagi and Chibi Chibi are swallowed by it as well, but the power of the incense burner Chibi Chibi produces destroys the black hole. Usagi's Star Seed is returned to her as she floats down in the arms of a woman that the Starlights identify as the long-lost princess they have been searching for so long.
194	28	"Crusade for the Galaxy: Legend of the Sailor Wars"; Transliteration: "Ginga no seisen, Sērā Wōzu densetsu" (Japanese: 銀河の聖戦 セーラーウォーズ伝説)	Noriyo Sasaki	Ryōta Yamaguchi	Kazuhisa Asai	Yoshihiro Kitano	December 7, 1996	7.5
Princess Kakyuu reveals that she came to planet Earth to find the mystical almighty Light of Hope that will stop Galaxia from trying to plunge the entire universe into chaos. The Sailor Guardians try to protect Usagi from an attack, by following her all the time. Meanwhile, Usagi tries to contact Mamoru as she is now getting very concerned. Sailor Tin Nyanko attempts to attack Usagi on the roof of her high-school. When Eternal Sailor Moon uses her much, much stronger attack on Sailor Tin Nyanko, her right golden bracelet is knocked off by the enormously strengthened attack, causing that side of Sailor Tin Nyanko to turn white. Usagi collapses in despair in front of Seiya, as she cannot stand being without Mamoru by her side any longer, so Seiya comforts her.
195	29	"Princess Kakyu Perishes: Advent of Galaxia"; Transliteration: "Kakyū Purinsesu shōmetsu! Gyarakushia kōrin" (Japanese: 火球皇女消滅!ギャラクシア降臨)	Masahiro Hosoda	Kazuhiko Kanbe	Hidekazu Nakanishi	Michiaki Sugimoto	December 14, 1996	8.1
With their long-lost princess found, the Three Lights announce that they will disband and hold their final concert. Rei soon learns from Usagi that she didn't get a reply from Mamoru since he left. Then Ami found disturbing news that Mamoru never arrived in America. Usagi visits Seiya and admits she sees their pseudo-romance as a 'one-sided love'; He reciprocates the feeling. As the Three Lights perform the finale of their concert, Sailor Tin Nyanko attacks, but she feels torn between her good side and her bad side. Galaxia appears and removes her last bracelet that kills her. Princess Kakyuu ultimately sacrifices herself to defend Eternal Sailor Moon, the Super Sailor Guardians, and Starlights, enabling Galaxia to obtain her Star Seed.
196	30	"Countdown to Destruction: The Sailor Guardians' Last Battle"; Transliteration: "Ginga horobiru toki! Sērā Senshi saigo no tatakai" (Japanese: 銀河滅びる時!S戦士最後の戦い)	Harume Kosaka	Genki Yoshimura	Kazuhisa Asai	Minako Itō	January 11, 1997	7.7
With Princess Kakyuu's Star Seed in hand, Galaxia begins to attack the Earth and obtains the Star Seeds of every innocent person. The Starlights have already confronted Galaxia to avenge their princess, and the Sailor Guardians go after them. When they reach Galaxia and the Starlights, Galaxia steals the four Inner Guardians' Star Seeds, killing them. Seeing all the Star Seeds that Galaxia has been gathering, Eternal Sailor Moon recognizes one of them to be Mamoru's.
197	31	"Ruler of the Galaxy: The Menace of Galaxia"; Transliteration: "Ginga no shihaisha! Gyarakushia no kyōi" (Japanese: 銀河の支配者! ギャラクシアの脅威)	Hiroki Shibata	Ryōta Yamaguchi	Kazuyuki Hashimoto	Shigetaka Kiyoyama	January 18, 1997	7.5
Eternal Sailor Moon learns that Galaxia took Mamoru's Golden Star Seed in the beginning of the season despite not going to America for months. The five Sailor Guardians retreat to Galaxy TV, where Uranus, Neptune, Pluto, and Saturn head off to fight Galaxia. Super Sailor Saturn also learns Galaxia was the one responsible for releasing Queen Nehelenia, in order to force her awakening as the Sailor Guardian of Death and Destruction. Their efforts prove futile, and Galaxia simply offers them a deal to side with her and live without their Star Seeds. Pluto and Saturn oppose, but Uranus and Neptune accept Galaxia's bracelets. To prove their loyalty to her, they kill Pluto and Saturn and obtain their Star Seeds.
198	32	"Dying Stars: Uranus and Neptune's Last Stand"; Transliteration: "Kieyuku hoshiboshi! Uranusu-tachi no saigo" (Japanese: 消えゆく星々!ウラヌス達の最期)	Junichi Sato	Atsushi Maekawa	Yoshiyuki Shikano	Yoshihiro Kitano	January 25, 1997	8.4
Eternal Sailor Moon and the Starlights must face off their own teammates in a battle for their lives. When Galaxia commands the two to take their Star Seeds, they turn on to Galaxia and attack her instead, thinking once that her Star Seed is removed, she'll be killed. But Galaxia has no Star Seed, and since Sailor Uranus and Sailor Neptune betrayed her, she removes their bracelets and leaves them to die. After the Starlights encourage Eternal Sailor Moon to keep fighting, Galaxia reveals a shocking revelation: she is in fact the legendary Sailor Guardian who sealed Chaos into her own body.
199	33	"The Light of Hope: The Final Battle for the Galaxy"; Transliteration: "Kibō no Hikari! Ginga wo kaketa saishū kessen" (Japanese: 希望の光!銀河をかけた最終決戦)	Masahiro Hosoda	Ryōta Yamaguchi	Kazuhisa Asai	Michiaki Sugimoto	February 1, 1997	8.1
With only Eternal Sailor Moon, Chibi Chibi, and the Starlights left, the Starlights give the last of their strength and energy to attempt to defeat Sailor Galaxia, but they suffer terrible wounds in the process. Eternal Sailor Moon believes it is possible to turn Sailor Galaxia good again, and while her Eternal healing powers attempt to work, Sailor Galaxia retaliates at the last minute and breaks her Eternal Tiare, nearly killing Eternal Sailor Moon, by shattering her Star Seed. Chibi Chibi then reveals herself as the long-lost Light of Hope.
200	34	"Usagi's Love: The Moonlight Illuminates the Galaxy"; Transliteration: "Usagi no ai! Gekkō ginga wo terasu" (Japanese: うさぎの愛!月光銀河を照らす)	Takuya Igarashi	Ryōta Yamaguchi	Kazuyuki Hashimoto	Katsumi Tamegai	February 8, 1997	10.3
The Light of Hope restores Eternal Sailor Moon's Star Seed, and transforms into the mystical Sword of Sealing, which she begs Princess Serenity to use as a weapon to defeat Sailor Galaxia. Princess Serenity refuses to kill her, believing that she still has kindness inside her. She instead heals Sailor Galaxia, and gives her the strength to expel Chaos entirely from her body, an act which returns darkness to the hearts and minds of all life, where it belongs together with the Light of Hope. After the battle, everyone returns to life, including Mamoru and Princess Kakyuu, very much to Usagi's and the Starlights' joy and happiness. The Starlights and Princess Kakyuu bid their goodbyes and leave to their home planet. The series ends with Usagi and Mamoru kissing under a large full moon.

== Development ==
From the beginning of its production, it was known that Sailor Stars would be the show's final season. A writer for Animedia magazine reported in April 1996 that the season's first six episodes, which focus on Queen Nehelenia's return, act as a prologue; the story proper begins with the seventh episode, which was broadcast in May. In a retrospective of the series, an Animage writer highlighted that Sailor Stars follows a two-part structure that is similar to Sailor Moon R, the show's second season. Episode 167 through 172 make up the anime-original storyline "Resurrection of Nehelenia Arc", while the remainder of the season contains the "Sailor Galaxia Arc" based on the manga.

== Release ==
=== Broadcast ===
Sailor Stars premiered on March 9, 1996, on TV Asahi, with new episodes airing every Saturday at 7:00 pm.

== Reception ==
=== Ratings ===
Sailor Moon : Japan viewers per episode (millions)

Season	Episode number																																		Average
Season	1	2	3	4	5	6	7	8	9	10	11	12	13	14	15	16	17	18	19	20	21	22	23	24	25	26	27	28	29	30	31	32	33	34	Average
5	12.7	10.6	8.9	7.2	9.2	7.5	10.5	8.5	8.2	9.9	9.5	7.4	8.4	6.2	4.2	6.0	7.4	5.1	7.6	7.9	8.4	7.4	7.9	7.7	9.0	8.3	7.5	7.5	8.1	7.7	7.5	8.4	8.1	10.3	8.1

=== Critical response ===
Animage magazine praised the "Resurrection of Nehelenia Arc" for the return of the Outer Guardians and pairing up Mercury with Uranus, Mars with Neptune, and Venus with Pluto, which was viewed as unique; however, the writer lamented the arc's short length.

Manga creator Naoko Takeuchi was displeased with the depiction of Sailor Starlights. In the manga, the characters are women, while the anime depicts them a female in their Sailor form and male in their civilian form.
