= The Show =

The Show may refer to:

== Arts, entertainment, and media ==
=== Films ===
- The Show (1922 film), starring Oliver Hardy
- The Show (1927 film), directed by Tod Browning
- The Show (1995 film), a hip hop documentary
- The Show (2017 film), an American satirical drama
- The Show (2020 film), a British mystery film

=== Albums ===
- The Show (eMC album), 2008
- The Show (Niall Horan album), 2023
- The Show (soundtrack), a soundtrack album from the 1995 hip hop documentary

=== Songs ===
- "The Show" (Doug E. Fresh song)
- "The Show" (Girls Aloud song)
- "The Show" (Lenka song)
- "The Show" (Reddi song)
- "The Show", a song by Hawk Nelson from Smile, It's the End of the World
- "The Show", a song by Kelly Rowland (featuring Tank) from Ms. Kelly
- "The Show", a song by Tony Harnell from Cinematic
- "The Show", a song by Steve Aoki and JJ Lin from Hiroquest 2: Double Helix
- "The Show", a song by Steve Hackett from Defector

=== Television ===
- The Show (British TV series), a 1997 British series
- The Show (South Korean TV program), a South Korean music show

=== Other uses in arts, entertainment, and media ===
- MLB: The Show, a series of baseball video games
- The Show (band), an American band
- The Show (concert), a 2021 online concert by Blackpink

== People ==
- Harold Arceneaux (born 1977), nicknamed "The Show", American professional basketball player

== See also ==
- Show (disambiguation)
- The Late Show (disambiguation)
- The Late Late Show (disambiguation)
- Le Show, a weekly syndicated public radio show hosted by satirist Harry Shearer
- The show must go on (disambiguation)
- The Show-Off (disambiguation)
- The Talk Show (disambiguation)
