= Talk Show =

Talk show is a type of radio or television programme.

Talk Show may also refer to:

- Talk Show (The Go-Go's album)
- Talk Show (Shae Jones album)
- Talk Show (Talk Show album)
- Talk Show (band), an American rock band
- "Talk Show" (Entourage), an Entourage episode
- Talkshow with Spike Feresten, a TV program

== See also ==
- The Talk (disambiguation)
- The Show (disambiguation)
- The Talk Show (disambiguation)
- List of talk show hosts
