= Talk Talk (disambiguation) =

Talk Talk were an English music group of the 1980s.

TalkTalk or Talk Talk may also refer to:

== Business ==
- TalkTalk Group, a British telecommunications company and its subsidiaries:
  - TalkTalk Business
  - TalkTalk Technology
  - TalkTalk TV
- TalkTalk Mobile (Portugal), a telecommunications company in Portugal

== Music ==
- "Talk Talk" (The Music Machine song), 1966
- "Talk Talk" (Talk Talk song), 1982
- "TalkTalk" (A Perfect Circle song), 2018
- "Talk Talk" (Charli XCX song), 2024
- "Talk Talk", a 1985 song by The Arrows
- "Talk Talk", a 1998 song by Nazareth from the album Boogaloo
- "Talk Talk", a 2013 song by Girls' Generation

== Other ==
- Talk Talk (novel), a 2006 novel by T.C. Boyle

== See also ==
- Talk (disambiguation)
- Talk Talk Talk (disambiguation)
- Talk That Talk (disambiguation)
- Talk the Talk, 2014 album by The Angels
