= Talk =

Talk may refer to:

== Communication ==
- Communication, the encoding and decoding of exchanged messages between people
- Conversation, interactive communication between two or more people
- Lecture, an oral presentation intended to inform or instruct
- Speech, the production of a spoken language

== Arts, entertainment, and media ==
- Talk (film), a 1994 Australian film
- Talk (magazine), an American magazine
- Talk (play), by Carl Hancock Rux
- "Talk" (Better Call Saul), a 2018 episode of Better Call Saul
- Talk radio, a radio broadcast program format
- Talk show, a TV or radio broadcast program format
- Talk (streaming service), a British talk radio and free ad-supported streaming television channel
- Granada Talk TV, a defunct British television channel

== Music ==
=== Artists ===
- Talk (musician)

=== Albums ===
- Talk (Daniel Johns album), 2015
- Talk (Paul Kelly album), 1981
- Talk (Yes album), 1994
- A Talk, 2014, Hyuna album

=== Songs ===
- "Talk" (Coldplay song), 2005
- "Talk" (DJ Snake song), 2016
- "Talk" (Khalid song), 2019
- "Talk" (Yeat song), 2022
- "Talk" (Why Don't We song), 2018
- "Talk", by 6lack from the album Since I Have a Lover, 2023
- "Talk", by All Hail the Silence from the album Daggers, 2019
- "Talk", by Beabadoobee from the album Beatopia, 2022
- "Talk", by Boyzone from the album Thank You & Goodnight, 2018
- "Talk", by Budjerah featuring May-a from the EP Conversations, 2022
- "Talk", by Daya from the album Sit Still, Look Pretty, 2016
- "Talk", by Falz from the album Moral Instruction, 2019
- "Talk", by Hozier from the album Wasteland, Baby!, 2019
- "Talk", by Kodaline from the album In a Perfect World, 2013
- "Talk", by Kreesha Turner from the album Passion, 2008
- "Talk", by Lee Konitz and Karl Berger from the album Seasons Change, 1980
- "Talk", by Liv Dawson, 2018
- "Talk", by M.I.A. from the album AIM, 2016
- "Talk", by Michael Sembello from Bossa Nova Hotel, 1983
- "Talk", by Pentagon from the album Universe: The Black Hall, 2020
- "Talk", by Phish from the album Billy Breathes, 1996
- "Talk", by Redgum from the album Midnight Sun, 1986
- "Talk", by Selena Gomez and Benny Blanco from the album I Said I Love You First, 2025
- "Talk", by the Residents from the album Census Taker, 1985
- "Talk", by Tori Kelly from the album Unbreakable Smile, 2015
- "Talk", by Tracy Bonham from the album The Liverpool Sessions, 1995
- "Talk", by Twice from the album This Is For, 2025
- "Talk", by West Coast Bad Boyz from the album West Coast Bad Boyz: High fo Xmas, 1994

== Computing ==
- talk (software), a Unix messaging program
- talk.*, one of the Big 8 (Usenet) hierarchies
- AppleTalk, an early networking protocol designed by Apple for their Macintosh computers
- Google Talk, a former instant messaging program

== See also ==
- Talk Talk, a British rock group active from 1981 to 1991
- Crosstalk, in electronics, any phenomenon by which a signal transmitted on one circuit or channel of a transmission system creates an undesired effect in another circuit or channel
- Lolly Talk, a Hong Kong Cantopop girl group
- Talk Tuah, American podcast
- Tolk, a municipality in Germany
- Talking Head (disambiguation)
- Compulsive talking, beyond the bounds of what is considered to be a socially acceptable amount of talking
- Talk Radio (disambiguation)
- Talk show (disambiguation)
- Talk Talk (disambiguation)
- Talk Talk Talk (disambiguation)
- Talking (disambiguation)
- The Talk (disambiguation)
