= Late Night =

Late Night may refer to:

== Entertainment ==
- Late Night (film), a 2019 American comedy film
- The Sims 3: Late Night, a 2010 expansion pack for The Sims 3
- Late Night, the third chapter of Deltarune.

=== Television ===
- Late-night television, generally United States programming airing after 11:30 pm EST
  - Late-night talk show, the most common type of late night television in the United States
- Late Night (franchise), an American late-night talk and variety show airing on NBC
  - Late Night with David Letterman (1982–93)
  - Late Night with Conan O'Brien (1993–2009)
  - Late Night with Jimmy Fallon (2009–14)
  - Late Night with Seth Meyers (2014–present)
- Late-night anime, anime series broadcast on television late at night or in the early hours of the morning

=== Music ===
- "Late Night" (song), a 2013 song by Foals
- "Late Night", a song by Syd Barrett from the album The Madcap Laughs, 1970
- "Late Night", a song by Odesza from the album A Moment Apart, 2017
- "Late Night", a 2020 song by Peakboy
- Late Nite, a 1989 album by American guitarist Neal Schon

== See also ==
- Late at Night
- The Late Show
