= Talking =

Taljing or Talkin' may refer to:

- Speech, the product of the action of to talk
- Communication by spoken words; conservatin or discussion

== Songs ==
- "Talking" (A Flock of Seagulls song), 1983
- "Talking" (The Rifles song), 2007
- "Talking / Once Again", by ¥$, 2024
- "Talking", by A House from I Want Too Much, 1990
- "Talking", by the Boys from Alternative Chartbusters, 1978
- "Talkin'", by Brass Construction from Brass Construction, 1975
- "Talking", by the Descendents from Cool to Be You, 2004
- "Talking", by Essie Jain from We Made This Ourselves, 2007
- "Talking", by Fiction Plane from Sparks, 2010
- "Talkin", by Kojey Radical from Reason to Smile, 2022
- "Talking", by London Grammar from Californian Soil, 2021
- "Talkin'", by Najee from Tokyo Blue, 1990
- "Talking", by September Girls from Cursing the Sea, 2014
- "Talking", by Slovenly from We Shoot for the Moon, 1989
- "Talkin'", by Switch from White Heat, 1975
- "Talkin'", by Three 6 Mafia from Choices: The Album, 2001
- "Talkin'", by Ty Segall from Ty Segall, 2017
- "Talkin'", by Van She from V, 2008

== Other uses ==
- Talking with Chris Hardwick, a TV talk show

== See also ==
- Talkin, a village in Cumbria, England
- Talking With..., a 1982 play by Jane Martin
- Talk (disambiguation)
- Talking Head (disambiguation)
- Talking point (disambiguation)
