= Talk Talk Talk (disambiguation) =

Talk Talk Talk is the second studio album by rock band The Psychedelic Furs.

Talk Talk Talk or similar may also refer to:

- "Talk, Talk, Talk", a 2004 song by The Ordinary Boys from their album Over the Counter Culture
- "Talk Talk Talk" (song), a 2011 song by Darren Hayes
- Talk Talk Talk (film), a 2007 Japanese youth romantic drama film

== See also ==
- Talk (disambiguation)
- Talk Talk (disambiguation)
