= Talk Radio =

Talk Radio may refer to:

== Radio ==
=== Format ===
- Talk radio, a call-in discussion format for radio broadcasts

=== Channels and stations ===
- Talk Radio (XM), an XM radio channel with a talk radio format
- Talkradio, a British national talk station
- Talksport, a British radio station formerly called "Talk Radio"

== Entertainment ==
=== Films ===
- Talk Radio (film), a 1988 Oliver Stone film loosely based on the play and the life of Alan Berg

=== Plays ===
- Talk Radio (play), a 1987 play written by Eric Bogosian

=== Television ===
- "Talk Radio" (Sailor Moon), season 1, episode 3 of the anime Sailor Moon, used in the DiC/Optimum Productions English language dub
