= The Late Show =

The Late Show may refer to:

== Film ==
- The Late Show (film), a 1977 film
- Late Show, a 1999 German film by director Helmut Dietl

== Music ==
- The Late Show (Eddie "Lockjaw" Davis album), a 1961 live album by jazz saxophonists Eddie "Lockjaw" Davis and Johnny Griffin
- The Late Show (Son of the Velvet Rat album), a 2018 live album by Son of the Velvet Rat

== Television ==
- The Late Show (1957 TV series), a 1957–1959 Australian television variety show
- The Late Show (1986 talk show), a 1986–1988 American late-night talk show hosted by Joan Rivers, Arsenio Hall, and Ross Shafer that aired on Fox
- The Late Show (British TV programme), a 1989–1995 British television arts magazine programme
- The Late Show (1992 TV series), a 1992–1993 Australian sketch comedy television series
- The Late Show (franchise), an American television late-night talk show franchise broadcast on CBS since 1993, that includes:
  - Late Show with David Letterman (1993–2015)
  - The Late Show with Stephen Colbert (2015–2026)
- "Late Show" (Space Ghost Coast to Coast), a 1996 episode of the animated series
- "The Late Show" (Modern Family), a 2013 (season 5) episode of the American sitcom
- The Late Show with Ewen Cameron, a 2016 Scottish talk show television programme

== Other uses ==
- The Late Show (radio program), a 2008–2011 Canadian radio documentary program featuring obituaries
- The Late Show (novel), a 2017 book by Michael Connelly

== See also ==
- Late Night (disambiguation)
- The Late Late Show (disambiguation)
- The Late Shift (disambiguation)
