= Dog show (disambiguation) =

A dog show is an event where dogs are exhibited.

Dog show may also refer to:

- Dog Show (album), by God Bullies, 1990
- "Dog Show" (Penny Crayon), a 1990 television episode
- "Dog Show" (The Ren & Stimpy Show), a 1992 television episode
- "Dog Show", a recurring Saturday Night Live sketch

== See also ==
- Best in Show (disambiguation)
- Dog exhibition (disambiguation)
- Dog trial (disambiguation)
- "Dog and pony show", a highly promoted, over-staged event designed to sway opinions
- List of dog sports
