= Show =

Show may refer to:

== Competition, event, or artistic production ==
- Agricultural show, associated with agriculture and animal husbandry
- Animal show, a judged event in the hobby of animal fancy
  - Cat show
  - Dog show
  - Horse show
  - Specialty show, a dog show which reviews a single breed
- Fashion show, showcase of clothing and/or accessories
- Show, an artistic production, such as:
  - Concert
  - Game show
  - Radio show
  - Talk show
  - Television show
  - Theatre production
- Trade show

== Arts, entertainment, and media ==
=== Films ===
- Show (film), a 2002 film

=== Albums ===
- Show (The Cure album), 1993
- Show (The Jesus Lizard album), 1994

=== Songs ===
- "Show" (song), a song by Ado, 2023

== People ==
=== Given name ===
- Show Hayami (born 1958), Japanese voice actor
- Show Lo (born 1979), Taiwanese singer–actor

=== Surname ===
- Eric Show (1956–1994), American baseball pitcher
- Laurie Show, a 1991 Pennsylvania murder victim

=== Nickname ===
- Manuel Cafumana (born 1999), Angolan footballer nicknamed "Show"

== Other uses ==
- Show, a 3G telecommunication service of Korea Telecom
- Bloody show, a term used in labour medicine

== See also ==
- The Show (disambiguation)
- Best in Show (disambiguation)
- Dog show (disambiguation)
- Mr. Show, a sketch comedy series
- Show and tell (disambiguation)
- Show of hands (disambiguation)
- Showtime (disambiguation)
- Talk show (disambiguation)
