= Dog trial (disambiguation) =

Dog trial may refer to:

- Dog agility trial
- Field trial, a competitive event for hunting dogs
- Obedience trial, in which a dog executes tasks as directed by a handler
- Sheepdog trial, in which herding dogs move sheep as directed by a handler
- Tracking trial, in which dogs follow a food trail

== See also ==
- Dog show (disambiguation)
- Dog exhibition (disambiguation)
