= The Show Goes On =

The Show Goes On may refer to:

- The Show Goes On (film), a 1937 British musical comedy film
- The Show Goes On (1936 film), or Three Maxims, a British drama directed by Herbert Wilcox
- The Show Goes On (TV series), a 1950–1952 American variety show
- "The Show Goes On" (song), by Lupe Fiasco, 2010
- "The Show Goes On", a song by Bruce Hornsby and the Range from Scenes from the Southside, 1988
- The Show Goes On, a 1997 revue featuring the songs of Harvey Schmidt and Tom Jones

== See also ==
- The show must go on (disambiguation)
