= Show and tell (disambiguation) =

Show and tell is the practice of showing something to an audience and describing it to them.

Show and tell may also refer to:

== Film and television ==
- Show & Tell, a 1998 film featuring Marin Hinkle
- Show & Tell (talk show), a 1990s Philippine TV series
- Show and Tell, a 2011 British TV comedy chat show hosted by Chris Addison
- "Show and Tell" (Stargate SG-1), a TV episode
- "Show and Tell" (2 Stupid Dogs), a TV episode

== Music ==
- Show and Tell (The Birthday Massacre album), 2009
- Show and Tell (Silvertide album), 2004
- Show and Tell (Al Wilson album), 1973
- "Show and Tell" (song), written by Jerry Fuller and first recorded by Johnny Mathis in 1972, also covered by various artists
- "Show & Tell", a song by Cherish from the 2006 album Unappreciated
- "Show & Tell", a song by Burna Boy from the 2019 album African Giant
- "Show & Tell", a song by Melanie Martinez from the 2019 album K-12

== Other uses ==
- Show and Tell, a play by Anthony Clarvoe
- Show and Tell, a 1991 children's book by Robert Munsch
- Show'N Tell, a 1960s/70s record-playing toy

== See also ==
- Show, don't tell, a writing technique
