= Late at Night =

Late at Night may refer to:

- Late at Night (Billy Preston album), 1979
- Late at Night (Dover album), 1999
- "Late at Night" (Electronic song), 1999
- "Late at Night" (Roddy Ricch song), 2021
- "Late at Night", a song by George Benson with Vicki Randle, from the 1983 album In Your Eyes
