= The show must go on (disambiguation) =

"The show must go on" is a literal and idiomatic expression.

The Show Must Go On may also refer to:

== Film ==
- The Show Must Go On (2007 film), a South Korean film directed by Han Jae-rim
- The Show Must Go On (2010 film), a Croatian film directed by Nevio Marasović

== Television ==
- "The Show Must Go On" (The Big O), 2003
- "The Show Must Go On??" (The Brady Bunch), 1972
- "The Show Must Go On" (ER), 2005
- "The Show Must Go On" (Grimm), 2014
- "The Show Must Go On" (Hazbin Hotel), 2024
- "The Show Must Go On" (McLeod's Daughters), 2009
- "The Show Must Go On" (The Nanny), 1994
- "The Show Must Go On" (One Tree Hill), 2006
- "The Show Must Go On" (Star Wars: Young Jedi Adventures), an episode of Star Wars: Young Jedi Adventures
- "The Show Must Go On" (Hazbin Hotel), an episode of the first season of Hazbin Hotel

== Music ==
- The Show Must Go On (Shirley Bassey album), 1996
- The Show Must Go On (Four Tops album), 1976
- "The Show Must Go On" (Leo Sayer song), 1973; covered by Three Dog Night, 1974
- "The Show Must Go On" (Pink Floyd song), 1979
- "The Show Must Go On" (Queen song), 1991
- "The Show Must Go On", by Chicago from Chicago XXXII: Stone of Sisyphus, 2008
- "The Show Must Go On", by Insane Clown Posse from Riddle Box, 1995
- "The Show Must Go On", by Nirvana from All of Us, 1968
- "Day After Day (The Show Must Go On)", by the Alan Parsons Project from I Robot, 1977

== Theatre ==
- The Show Must Go On (play), a 1991 play by Koki Mitani

== See also ==
- The Show Goes On (disambiguation)
- The Showgirl Must Go On, a concert residency starring Bette Midler
- The Show Must Go Online, a 2020 British web series
- "Why Must the Show Go On?", a song written by Noël Coward, from the 1972 revue Cowardy Custard
