= The Show-Off (disambiguation) =

The Show-Off is a 1924 stage play written by George Kelly.

The Show-Off may also refer to the following films:

- The Show-Off (1926 film), an American silent comedy film
- The Show-Off (1934 film), an American comedy film
- The Show-Off (1946 film), an American comedy film
- The Show-Off (1955 film), a French crime drama film

== See also ==
- Men Are Like That, 1930
