= The Late Late Show =

The Late Late Show may refer to:

== Music ==
- The Late, Late Show (album), 1957 album by Dakota Staton
  - "The Late, Late Show", a song by Roy Alfred and Murray Berlin, included on Staton's album
  - Also recorded by Nat King Cole on the 1959 album Welcome to the Club (Nat King Cole album)

== Television ==
- The Late Late Show (Irish talk show), which started airing in 1962
- The Late Late Show (American talk show) on CBS, which started airing in 1995:
  - The Late Late Show with Tom Snyder (1995–1999)
  - The Late Late Show with Craig Kilborn (1999–2004)
  - The Late Late Show with Craig Ferguson (2005–2014)
  - The Late Late Show with James Corden (2015–2023)

== See also ==
- The Late Show
- The Late, Late Breakfast Show, a BBC television light entertainment show broadcast from 1982 to 1986
- The Late, Late, Late Show, 1996 album by Frankenstein Drag Queens from Planet 13
