= Dog exhibition =

Dog exhibition can refer to:

- Dog show or conformation show, the most-common meaning, in which dogs are rated for how well their appearance conforms to a standard
- Dog trial (disambiguation)
- World's Ugliest Dog Contest, a dog show for ugly dogs

== See also ==
- Dog sports
