= Talk That Talk (disambiguation) =

Talk That Talk is a 2011 album by Rihanna.

Talk That Talk may also refer to:

- Talk That Talk (The Jazz Crusaders album) (1966)
- Talk That Talk (Johnny "Hammond" Smith album) (1960)
- "Talk That Talk" (Jackie Wilson song) (1959)
- "Talk That Talk" (Rihanna song) (2012)
- "Talk That Talk" (Twice song) (2022)

== See also ==
- Walk That Walk, Talk That Talk, a 1991 album by the Fabulous Thunderbirds
- You Talk That Talk!, a 1971 album by Gene Ammons and Sonny Stitt
