= TalkTalk Mobile (Portugal) =

Portuguese mobile virtual network operator

TalkTalk Mobile is a mobile virtual network operator which was launched in 2006 in Portugal over the network Optimus Telecomunicações, S.A. It is the former sister company of TalkTalk from the United Kingdom.

TalkTalk held talks with O2, Vodafone and Virgin Media in 2017 to sell off their mobile business to focus more on their broadband business, though this did not result in any formal offer.
