= List of Sailor Moon episodes =

The first season DVD box set, released in North America in 2003 by ADV Films

Sailor Moon, originally released in Japan as Pretty Soldier Sailor Moon (美少女戦士セーラームーン, Bishōjo Senshi Sērā Mūn), and later as Pretty Guardian Sailor Moon, is an anime television series adapted from the manga series of the same name written and illustrated by Naoko Takeuchi. The series was directed by Junichi Sato, Kunihiko Ikuhara and Takuya Igarashi and produced by TV Asahi and Toei Animation. The first four seasons were originally dubbed in English and released in North America by DIC Entertainment and Cloverway. The series concentrates on the adventures of Usagi Tsukino, a schoolgirl who learns that she and several other girls can transform into superheroines, the Sailor Guardians, and fight against evil forces that threaten the world: the Dark Kingdom, the Makaiju, the Black Moon Clan, the Death Busters, the Dead Moon Circus, and Shadow Galactica.

The anime series aired from March 7, 1992, to February 8, 1997, on TV Asahi in Japan. In addition to the 200 episodes, three feature-length films were produced, as well as five short films. In North America, the episodes aired from August 28, 1995, to December 21, 2000, on YTV in Canada, and in first-run syndication (and later on Cartoon Network courtesy of General Mills via barter syndication) in the United States.

The first two seasons of the series, Sailor Moon and Sailor Moon R, were sold across 20 VHS volumes in Japan in 1995, and by the end of that year, each volume had sold more than 300,000 copies. In 2000, ADV Films released the English dubs of the first two seasons to 20 VHS volumes. The first two English-language seasons were released on 14 Region 1 DVDs in 2002 by ADV. ADV also released subtitled, uncensored and uncut versions of the first two seasons in two separate Limited Edition DVD box sets in 2003. Pioneer Entertainment released both edited and unedited versions of the third and fourth seasons, Sailor Moon S and Sailor Moon Super S respectively, on DVD and VHS in 2001 and 2002. In 2004, the North American licensing rights to the anime series expired, as did General Mills' license to syndicate the show.

At the start of Sailor Moon S, the episode numbers for the English dub were adjusted by YTV to match those of the original Japanese version. There had previously been a gap in numbering because of seven episodes that had been cut or merged in the previous two seasons. Because of this, episode numbers 83–89 were never used for the dub. However, in the United States, 83–89 were used for the dub on Cartoon Network, and did not match those of the original Japanese version.

In May 2014, the entire anime (all 200 TV episodes, all three movies, and the TV specials) was relicensed by Viz Media in North America. The company began redubbing the entire series later that year in a process that looked to more closely follow the original translated scripts from the Japanese version compared to the original dub.

== Series overview ==
| Season | Title | Episodes | Originally released | | Direction |
| Season | Title | Episodes | First released | Last released | Direction |
|---|---|---|---|---|---|
| 1 | Sailor Moon | 46 | March 7, 1992 | February 27, 1993 | Junichi Sato |
| 2 | Sailor Moon R | 43 | March 6, 1993 | March 12, 1994 | Kunihiko Ikuhara; Junichi Sato (#1–13) |
| 3 | Sailor Moon S | 38 | March 19, 1994 | February 25, 1995 | Kunihiko Ikuhara |
| 4 | Sailor Moon SuperS | 39 | March 4, 1995 | March 2, 1996 | Kunihiko Ikuhara |
| 5 | Sailor Stars | 34 | March 9, 1996 | February 8, 1997 | Takuya Igarashi |

== Episodes ==
=== Season 1 (1992–93) ===
| Orig. | DiC | No. in season | DiC title Original Japanese & Viz titles | Directed by | Written by | Art directed by | Animation directed by | Original release date | English air date |
|---|---|---|---|---|---|---|---|---|---|
| 1 | 1 | 1 | "A Moon Star is Born" "The Crybaby: Usagi's Beautiful Transformation"; Transliteration: "Nakimushi Usagi no Karei naru Henshin" (Japanese: 泣き虫うさぎの華麗なる変身) | Junichi Sato | Sukehiro Tomita | Yoshiyuki Shikano | Hiromi Matsushita | 7 March 1992 | 28 August 1995; 19 May 2014 |
| 2 | — | 2 | "Punishment Awaits! The House of Fortune is the Monster Mansion"; Transliteration: "Oshiokiyo! Uranai Hausu wa Yōma no Yakata" (Japanese: おしおきよ! 占いハウスは妖魔の館) | Takao Yoshizawa | Shigeru Yanagikawa | Yoshiyuki Shikano | Katsuji Matsumoto | 14 March 1992 | 19 May 2014; 7 June 2024 (Note: The English broadcast premiere dates of Viz Media's dub on Adult Swim's Toonami Rewind programming block are shown for any episodes that were skipped over in DIC Entertainment's dub.) |
| 3 | 2 | 3 | "Talk Radio" "The Mysterious Sleeping Sickness: Protect the Girls in Love"; Transliteration: "Nazo no Nemuribyō, Mamore Otome no Koisuru Kokoro" (Japanese: 謎のねむり病、守れ乙女の恋する心) | Kazuhisa Takenouchi | Katsuyuki Sumisawa | Minoru Ōkōchi | Kunihiko Natsume | 21 March 1992 | 29 August 1995; 19 May 2014 |
| 4 | 3 | 4 | "Slim City" "Learn How to Be Skinny From Usagi"; Transliteration: "Usagi ga Oshiemasu! Surimu ni naru Hō" (Japanese: うさぎが教えます! スリムになる法) | Harume Kosaka | Sukehiro Tomita | Yoshiyuki Shikano | Kiyoshi Matsumoto | 28 March 1992 | 30 August 1995; 19 May 2014 |
| 5 | — | 5 | "Scent of a Monster! Chanela Will Steal Your Love"; Transliteration: "Yōma no Kaori! Shanēra wa ai o Nusumu" (Japanese: 妖魔の香り! シャネーラは愛を盗む) | Yūji Endō | Shigeru Yanagikawa | Kenichi Tajiri | Ikuko Itō | 11 April 1992 | 26 May 2014; 28 June 2024 |
| 6 | — | 6 | "Protect the Melody of Love: Usagi Plays Cupid"; Transliteration: "Mamore Koi no Merodi! Usagi wa Kyūpiddo" (Japanese: 守れ恋の曲! うさぎはキューピッド) | Kunihiko Ikuhara | Katsuyuki Sumisawa | Yoshiyuki Shikano | Kazuko Tadano | 18 April 1992 | 26 May 2014; 5 July 2024 |
| 7 | 4 | 7 | "So You Want to Be a Superstar" "Usagi Learns Her Lesson: Becoming a Star is Hard Work"; Transliteration: "Usagi Hansei! Sutā no Michi wa Kibishī" (Japanese: うさぎ反省! スターの道はきびしい) | Junichi Sato | Shigeru Yanagikawa | Minoru Ōkōchi | Katsuji Matsumoto | 25 April 1992 | 31 August 1995; 2 June 2014 |
| 8 | 5 | 8 | "Computer School Blues" "The Girl Genius is a Monster: The Brainwashing Cram School of Horror"; Transliteration: "Tensai Shōjo wa Yōma na no? Kyōfu no Sen'nō Juku" (Japanese: 天才少女は妖魔なの? 恐怖の洗脳塾) | Takao Yoshizawa | Sukehiro Tomita | Kenichi Tajiri | Kunihiko Natsume | 2 May 1992 | 1 September 1995; 2 June 2014 |
| 9 | 6 | 9 | "Time Bomb" "Usagi's Disaster: Beware of the Clock of Confusion"; Transliteration: "Usagi no Sainan! Awate Tokei ni Goyōjin" (Japanese: うさぎの災難! あわて時計にご用心) | Harume Kosaka | Katsuyuki Sumisawa | Kazuyuki Hashimoto | Akira Nakamura | 9 May 1992 | 6 September 1995; 9 June 2014 |
| 10 | 7 | 10 | "An Uncharmed Life" "The Cursed Bus: Enter Mars, the Guardian of Fire"; Transliteration: "Norowareta Basu! Honō no Senshi Māzu Tōjō" (Japanese: 呪われたバス! 炎の戦士マーズ登場) | Kazuhisa Takenouchi | Sukehiro Tomita | Yoshiyuki Shikano | Kiyoshi Matsumoto | 16 May 1992 | 7 September 1995; 9 June 2014 |
| 11 | 8 | 11 | "Nightmare in Dreamland" "Usagi vs. Rei: Nightmare in Dream Land"; Transliteration: "Usagi to Rei Taiketsu? Yume Rando no Akumu" (Japanese: うさぎとレイ対決? 夢ランドの悪夢) | Kunihiko Ikuhara | Shigeru Yanagikawa | Minoru Ōkōchi | Masahiro Ando | 23 May 1992 | 8 September 1995; 16 June 2014 |
| 12 | 9 | 12 | "Cruise Blues" "I Want a Boyfriend: The Luxury Cruise Ship is a Trap"; Transliteration: "Watashi Datte Kare ga Hoshī! Gōkasen no Wana" (Japanese: 私だって彼が欲しい! 豪華船のワナ) | Yūji Endō | Katsuyuki Sumisawa | Kenichi Tajiri | Kazuko Tadano | 30 May 1992 | 11 September 1995; 16 June 2014 |
| 13 | 10 | 13 | "Fight to the Finish" "Girls Unite: The End of Jadeite"; Transliteration: "On'na no ko wa Danketsu yo! Jedaito no Saigo" (Japanese: 女の子は団結よ! ジェダイトの最期) | Harume Kosaka | Sukehiro Tomita | Kazuyuki Hashimoto | Akira Nakamura | 6 June 1992 | 12 September 1995; 23 June 2014 |
| 14 | 11 | 14 | "Match Point for Sailor Moon" "A New Enemy Appears: Nephrite's Evil Crest"; Transliteration: "Arata naru Kyōteki, Nefuraito ma no Monshō" (Japanese: 新たなる強敵、ネフライト魔の紋章) | Junichi Sato | Shigeru Yanagikawa | Yoshiyuki Shikano | Hisashi Kagawa | 13 June 1992 | 13 September 1995; 23 June 2014 |
| 15 | 12 | 15 | "An Unnatural Phenomena" "Usagi's Panic: Rei's First Date"; Transliteration: "Usagi Aseru! Rei-chan Hatsu Dēto" (Japanese: うさぎアセる! レイちゃん初デート) | Kunihiko Ikuhara | Katsuyuki Sumisawa | Minoru Ōkōchi | Kiyoshi Matsumoto | 20 June 1992 | 14 September 1995; 11 August 2014 |
| 16 | 13 | 16 | "Wedding Day Blues" "A Girl's Dream: Usagi Becomes a Bride"; Transliteration: "Junpaku Doresu no Yume! Usagi Hanayome ni naru" (Japanese: 純白ドレスの夢! うさぎ花嫁になる) | Kazuhisa Takenouchi | Megumi Sugihara | Kenichi Tajiri | Masahiro Ando | 27 June 1992 | 15 September 1995; 30 June 2014 |
| 17 | 14 | 17 | "Shutter Bugged" "Usagi's a Model: The Flash of the Monster Camera"; Transliteration: "Moderu wa Usagi? Yōma Kamera no Nessha" (Japanese: モデルはうさぎ? 妖魔カメラの熱写) | Yūji Endō | Sukehiro Tomita | Kazuyuki Hashimoto | Kazuko Tadano | 4 July 1992 | 18 September 1995; 30 June 2014 |
| 18 | 15 | 18 | "Dangerous Dollies" "Shingo's Love: The Grieving Doll"; Transliteration: "Shingo no Junjō! Kanashimi no Furansu Ningyō" (Japanese: 進悟の純情! 哀しみのフランス人形) | Harume Kosaka | Shigeru Yanagikawa | Yoshiyuki Shikano | Ikuko Itō | 11 July 1992 | 19 September 1995; 7 July 2014 |
| 19 | 16 | 19 | "Who is That Masked Man?" "Usagi's Joy: A Love Letter From Tuxedo Mask"; Transliteration: "Usagi Kangeki! Takishīdo Kamen no Rabu Reta" (Japanese: うさぎ感激! タキシード仮面の恋文) | Takao Yoshizawa | Sukehiro Tomita | Minoru Ōkōchi | Akira Nakamura | 25 July 1992 | 20 September 1995; 7 July 2014 |
| 20 | — | 20 | "The Summer, the Beach, Youth and Ghosts"; Transliteration: "Natsu yo Umi yo Seishun yo! Omake ni Yūrei mo yo" (Japanese: 夏よ海よ青春よ! おまけに幽霊もよ) | Kazuhisa Takenouchi | Megumi Sugihara | Kenichi Tajiri | Hisashi Kagawa | 1 August 1992 | 14 July 2014; 30 August 2024 |
| 21 | 17 | 21 | "An Animated Mess" "Protect the Children's Dreams: Friendship Through Anime"; Transliteration: "Kodomodachi no Yume Mamore! Anime ni Musubu Yūjō" (Japanese: 子供達の夢守れ! アニメに結ぶ友情) | Kunihiko Ikuhara | Katsuyuki Sumisawa | Kazuyuki Hashimoto | Hiromi Matsushita & Kazuko Tadano | 8 August 1992 | 21 September 1995; 14 July 2014 |
| 22 | 18 | 22 | "Worth a Princess' Ransom" "Romance Under the Moon: Usagi's First Kiss"; Transliteration: "Gekka no Romansu! Usagi no Hatsu Kissu" (Japanese: 月下のロマンス! うさぎの初キッス) | Yūji Endō | Sukehiro Tomita | Yoshiyuki Shikano | Kiyoshi Matsumoto | 15 August 1992 | 22 September 1995; 21 July 2014 |
| 23 | 19 | 23 | "Molly's Folly" "Wish Upon a Star: Naru's First Love"; Transliteration: "Nagare Hoshi ni Negai wo! Naru-chan no Jun'ai" (Japanese: 流れ星に願いを! なるちゃんの純愛) | Harume Kosaka | Shigeru Yanagikawa | Yoshiyuki Shikano | Masahiro Ando | 22 August 1992 | 25 September 1995; 21 July 2014 |
| 24 | 20 | 24 | "A Friend in Wolf's Clothing" "Naru's Tears: Nephrite Dies for Love"; Transliteration: "Naru-chan Gōkyū! Nefuraito Ai no Shi" (Japanese: なるちゃん号泣! ネフライト愛の死) | Junichi Sato & Takuya Igarashi | Sukehiro Tomita | Minoru Ōkōchi | Ikuko Itō | 29 August 1992 | 26 September 1995; 28 July 2014 |
| 25 | 21 | 25 | "Jupiter Comes Thundering In" "Jupiter, the Powerful Girl in Love"; Transliteration: "Koisuru Kairiki Shōjo, Jupitā-chan" (Japanese: 恋する怪力少女、ジュピターちゃん) | Kazuhisa Takenouchi | Shigeru Yanagikawa | Kenichi Tajiri | Hisashi Kagawa | 5 September 1992 | 27 September 1995; 28 July 2014 |
| 26 | 22 | 26 | "The Power of Friendship" "Restore Naru's Smile: Usagi's Friendship"; Transliteration: "Naru-chan ni Egao o! Usagi no Yūjō" (Japanese: なるちゃんに笑顔を! うさぎの友情) | Kunihiko Ikuhara | Sukehiro Tomita | Kazuyuki Hashimoto | Akira Nakamura | 12 September 1992 | 28 September 1995; 4 August 2014 |
| 27 | 23 | 27 | "Mercury's Mental Match" "Crushing on Ami: The Boy Who Can See the Future"; Transliteration: "Ami-chan e no Koi!? Mirai Yochi no Shōnen" (Japanese: 亜美ちゃんへの恋!? 未来予知の少年) | Takao Yoshizawa | Katsuyuki Sumisawa | Yoshiyuki Shikano | Masahiro Ando | 10 October 1992 | 29 September 1995; 4 August 2014 |
| 28 | 24 | 28 | "An Artful Attack" "The Painting of Love: Usagi and Mamoru Get Closer"; Transliteration: "Koi no Irasuto, Usagi to Mamoru ga Sekkin?" (Japanese: 恋のイラスト、うさぎと衛が接近?) | Yūji Endō | Megumi Sugihara | Minoru Ōkōchi | Kazuko Tadano | 17 October 1992 | 2 October 1995; 11 August 2014 |
| 29 | 25 | 29 | "Too Many Girlfriends" "Total Chaos: The Messy Love Rectangle"; Transliteration: "Daikonsen! Guchagucha Koi no Shikaku Kankei" (Japanese: 大混線! グチャグチャ恋の四角関係) | Harume Kosaka | Shigeru Yanagikawa | Kenichi Tajiri | Kiyoshi Matsumoto | 24 October 1992 | 3 October 1995; 11 August 2014 |
| 30 | 26 | 30 | "Grandpa's Follies" "Grandpa Loses Control: Rei in Danger"; Transliteration: "Ojī-chan Ranshin, Rei-chan no Kiki" (Japanese: お爺ちゃん乱心、レイちゃんの危機) | Kazuhisa Takenouchi | Sukehiro Tomita | Kazuyuki Hashimoto | Akira Nakamura | 31 October 1992 | 4 October 1995; 18 August 2014 |
| 31 | 27 | 31 | "Kitty Chaos" "Loved and Chased: Luna's Worst Day Ever"; Transliteration: "Koisarete Owarete! Runa no Saiaku no Hi" (Japanese: 恋されて追われて! ルナの最悪の日) | Kunihiko Ikuhara | Katsuyuki Sumisawa | Yoshiyuki Shikano | Ikuko Itō | 7 November 1992 | 5 October 1995; 18 August 2014 |
| 32 | 28 | 32 | "Tuxedo Melvin" "Umino's Resolve: I'll Protect Naru"; Transliteration: "Umino no Kesshin! Naru-chan wa Boku ga Mamoru" (Japanese: 海野の決心! なるちゃんは僕が守る) | Takao Yoshizawa | Shigeru Yanagikawa | Minoru Ōkōchi | Hisashi Kagawa | 14 November 1992 | 6 October 1995; 25 August 2014 |
| 33 | 29 | 33 | "Sailor Venus Makes the Scene" "Enter Venus, the Last Sailor Guardian"; Transliteration: "Saigo no Sērā Senshi, Vīnasu Tōjō" (Japanese: 最後のセーラー戦士、ヴィーナス登場) | Yūji Endō | Megumi Sugihara | Kenichi Tajiri | Masahiro Ando | 21 November 1992 | 9 October 1995; 25 August 2014 |
| 34 | 30 | 34 | "A Crystal Clear Destiny" "The Shining Silver Crystal: The Moon Princess Appears"; Transliteration: "Hikari Kagayaku Ginsuishō! Tsuki no Purinsesu Tōjō" (Japanese: 光輝く銀水晶! 月のプリンセス登場) | Harume Kosaka | Katsuyuki Sumisawa | Kazuyuki Hashimoto | Kazuko Tadano | 28 November 1992 | 10 October 1995; 1 September 2014 |
| 35 | 31 | 35 | "A Reluctant Princess" "Returning Memories: Usagi and Mamoru's Past"; Transliteration: "Yomigaeru Kioku! Usagi to Mamoru no Kako" (Japanese: よみがえる記憶! うさぎと衛の過去) | Takuya Igarashi | Katsuyuki Sumisawa | Yoshiyuki Shikano | Akira Nakamura | 5 December 1992 | 11 October 1995; 1 September 2014 |
| 36 | 32 | 36 | "Bad Hair Day" "Usagi's Confusion: Is Tuxedo Mask Evil?"; Transliteration: "Usagi Konran! Takishīdo Kamen wa Aku?" (Japanese: うさぎ混乱! タキシード仮面は悪?) | Kunihiko Ikuhara | Sukehiro Tomita | Minoru Ōkōchi | Kiyoshi Matsumoto | 12 December 1992 | 12 October 1995; 8 September 2014 |
| 37 | 33 | 37 | "Little Miss Manners" "Let's Become a Princess: Usagi's Bizarre Training"; Transliteration: "Mezase Purinsesu? Usagi no Chin Tokkun" (Japanese: めざせプリンセス? うさぎの珍特訓) | Hiromichi Matano | Shigeru Yanagikawa | Kenichi Tajiri | Ikuko Itō | 19 December 1992 | 13 October 1995; 8 September 2014 |
| 38 | 34 | 38 | "Ski Bunny Blues" "The Snow, the Mountains, Friendship and Monsters"; Transliteration: "Yuki yo Yama yo Yūjō yo! Yappari Yōma mo yo" (Japanese: 雪よ山よ友情よ! やっぱり妖魔もよ) | Takao Yoshizawa | Katsuyuki Sumisawa | Kazuyuki Hashimoto | Hisashi Kagawa | 26 December 1992 | 16 October 1995; 15 September 2014 |
| 39 | 35 | 39 | "The Ice Princess" "Paired with a Monster: Mako, the Ice Skating Queen"; Transliteration: "Yōma to Pea!? Hyojo no Joō Mako-chan" (Japanese: 妖魔とペア!? 氷上の女王まこちゃん) | Kazuhisa Takenouchi | Megumi Sugihara | Yoshiyuki Shikano | Kazuko Tadano | 9 January 1993 | 17 October 1995; 15 September 2014 |
| 40 | 36 | 40 | "The Last Resort" "The Legendary Lake Yokai: The Bond of Usagi's Family"; Transliteration: "Mizūmi no Densetsu Yōkai! Usagi Kazoku no Kizuna" (Japanese: 湖の伝説妖怪! うさぎ家族のきずな) | Harume Kosaka | Megumi Sugihara | Minoru Ōkōchi | Masahiro Ando | 16 January 1993 | 18 October 1995; 22 September 2014 |
| 41 | 37 | 41 | "Tuxedo Unmask" "I Won't Run Away from Love Anymore: Ami vs. Mamoru"; Transliteration: "Mō Koi kara Nigenai! Ami to Mamoru Taiketsu" (Japanese: もう恋から逃げない! 亜美と衛対決) | Yūji Endō | Katsuyuki Sumisawa | Kenichi Tajiri | Akira Nakamura | 23 January 1993 | 19 October 1995; 22 September 2014 |
| 42 | — | 42 | "Sailor Venus' Past: Minako's Tragic Love"; Transliteration: "Sērā Vīnasu no Kako, Minako no Hiren" (Japanese: S(セーラー)ヴィーナスの過去、美奈子の悲恋) | Takuya Igarashi | Sukehiro Tomita | Kazuyuki Hashimoto | Kiyoshi Matsumoto | 30 January 1993 | 29 September 2014; 15 November 2024 |
| 43 | 38 | 43 | "Fractious Friends" "Usagi Abandoned: The Falling-Out of the Sailor Guardians"; Transliteration: "Usagi ga Koritsu? Sērā Senshi-tachi no Ogenka" (Japanese: うさぎが孤立? S(セーラー)戦士達の大ゲンカ) | Kazuhisa Takenouchi | Shigeru Yanagikawa | Yoshiyuki Shikano | Katsumi Tamegai | 6 February 1993 | 20 October 1995; 29 September 2014 |
| 44 | 39 | 44 | "The Past Returns" "Usagi's Awakening: A Message from the Distant Past"; Transliteration: "Usagi no Kakusei! Chōkako no Messēji" (Japanese: うさぎの覚醒! 超過去のメッセージ) | Takao Yoshizawa | Sukehiro Tomita | Minoru Ōkōchi | Hisashi Kagawa | 13 February 1993 | 23 October 1995; 6 October 2014 |
| 45 | 40a | 45 | "The Day of Destiny" "Death of the Sailor Guardians: The Tragic Final Battle"; Transliteration: "Sērā Senshi Shisu! Hisō naru Saishūsen" (Japanese: セーラー戦士死す! 悲壮なる最終戦) | Kōnosuke Uda | Shigeru Yanagikawa | Kenichi Tajiri | Ikuko Itō | 20 February 1993 | 24 October 1995; 6 October 2014 |
| 46 | 40b | 46 | "Brand New Life" "Usagi's Eternal Wish: A Brand New Life"; Transliteration: "Usagi no Omoi wa Towa ni! Atarashiki Tensei" (Japanese: うさぎの想いは永遠に! 新しき転生) | Kunihiko Ikuhara | Sukehiro Tomita | Kazuyuki Hashimoto | Kazuko Tadano | 27 February 1993 | 24 October 1995; 13 October 2014 |

=== Season 2: R (1993–94) ===
| Orig. | DiC | No. in season | DiC title Original Japanese and Viz titles | Directed by | Written by | Art director(s) | Animation director(s) | Original release date | English air date |
|---|---|---|---|---|---|---|---|---|---|
| 47 | 41 | 1 | "The Return of Sailor Moon" "Moon Returns: The Mysterious Aliens Appear"; Transliteration: "Mūn fukkatsu! Nazo no eirian shutsugen" (Japanese: ムーン復活!謎のエイリアン出現) | Kazuhisa Takenouchi | Shigeru Yanagawa | Yoshiyuki Shikano | Taichi Nakamura | March 6, 1993 | November 10, 1995 |
| 48 | 42 | 2 | "So You Want to Be in Pictures" "For Love and for Justice: Sailor Guardians Once Again"; Transliteration: "Ai to seigi yue! Sērā Senshi futatabi" (Japanese: 愛と正義ゆえ!セーラー戦士再び) | Yūji Endō | Katsuyuki Sumisawa | Minoru Ōkōchi | Shinya Hasegawa | March 13, 1993 | November 13, 1995 |
| 49 | 43 | 3 | "A Knight to Remember" "For Whom is the White Rose? The Moonlight Knight Appears"; Transliteration: "Shiroi bara wa dare ni? Tsukikage no Naito tōjō" (Japanese: 白いバラは誰に?月影の騎士登場) | Harume Kosaka | Sukehiro Tomita | Kenichi Tajiri | Masahiro Andō | March 20, 1993 | November 14, 1995 |
| 50 | 44 | 4 | "VR Madness" "Usagi's Crisis: The Tiara Stops Working"; Transliteration: "Usagi no kiki! Tiara sadō sezu" (Japanese: うさぎの危機!ティアラ作動せず) | Takao Yoshizawa | Megumi Sugihara | Kazuyuki Hashimoto | Katsumi Tamegai | April 10, 1993 | November 15, 1995 |
| 51 | 45 | 5 | "Cherry Blossom Time" "A New Transformation: Usagi's Power-Up"; Transliteration: "Atarashiki henshin! Usagi pawā appu" (Japanese: 新しき変身!うさぎパワーアップ) | Kunihiko Ikuhara | Shigeru Yanagawa | Yoshiyuki Shikano | Hisashi Kagawa | April 17, 1993 | November 16, 1995 |
| 52 | 46 | 6 | "Kindergarten Chaos" "The Targeted Kindergarteners: Venus to the Rescue"; Transliteration: "Nerawareta enji! Vīnasu daikatsuyaku" (Japanese: 狙われた園児!ヴィーナス大活躍) | Takuya Igarashi | Katsuyuki Sumisawa | Minoru Ōkōchi | Taichi Nakamura | April 24, 1993 | November 17, 1995 |
| 53 | 47 | 7 | "Much Ado About Babysitting" "Mamoru and Usagi's Babysitting Mayhem"; Transliteration: "Mamoru to Usagi no bebīshittā sōdō" (Japanese: 衛とうさぎのベビーシッター騒動) | Yūji Endō | Sukehiro Tomita | Kenichi Tajiri | Kazuko Tadano | May 1, 1993 | November 20, 1995 |
| 54 | 48 | 8 | "Raye's Day in the Spotlight" "The School Festival is for Me?! Queen Rei's Song"; Transliteration: "Bunkasai wa watashi no tame?! Rei joō nesshō" (Japanese: 文化祭は私のため?!レイ女王熱唱) | Harume Kosaka | Katsuyuki Sumisawa | Kazuyuki Hashimoto | Masahiro Andō | May 8, 1993 | November 21, 1995 |
| 55 | 49 | 9 | "Food Fetish" "Is Seijuro the Moonlight Knight? Mako on Fire"; Transliteration: "Tsukikage wa Seijūrō? Moeru Mako-chan" (Japanese: 月影は星十郎?もえるまこちゃん) | Kazuhisa Takenouchi | Megumi Sugihara | Yoshiyuki Shikano | Ikuko Ito | May 22, 1993 | November 22, 1995 |
| 56 | 50 | 10 | "Mirror, Mirror on the Wall" "Steal a Kiss from Mamoru! An's Project Snow White"; Transliteration: "Mamoru no kisu ubae! An no Shirayuki-hime sakusen" (Japanese: 衛のキス奪え!アンの白雪姫作戦) | Noriyo Sasaki | Sukehiro Tomita | Minoru Ōkōchi | Shinya Hasegawa | May 29, 1993 | November 23, 1995 |
| 57 | 51 | 11 | "Detention Doldrums" "After School Trouble: Usagi is a Target"; Transliteration: "Hōkago ni goyōjin! Nerawareta Usagi" (Japanese: 放課後にご用心!狙われたうさぎ) | Yūji Endō | Katsuyuki Sumisawa | Kenichi Tajiri | Taichi Nakamura | June 5, 1993 | November 4, 1995 |
| 58 | 52 | 12 | "Secret Garden (Part 1 of 2)" "Disconnecting Love: The Raging Makai Tree"; Transliteration: "Surechigau ai no kokoro! Ikari no Makaiju" (Japanese: すれちがう愛の心!怒りの魔界樹) | Takao Yoshizawa | Shigeru Yanagawa | Kazuyuki Hashimoto | Kazuko Tadano | June 12, 1993 | November 27, 1995 |
| 59 | 53 | 13 | "Treed (Part 2 of 2)" "True Love Awakens: The Makai Tree's Secret"; Transliteration: "Mezameru shinjitsu no ai! Makaiju no himitsu" (Japanese: めざめる真実の愛!魔界樹の秘密) | Kazuhisa Takenouchi | Shigeru Yanagawa | Yoshiyuki Shikano | Katsumi Tamegai | June 19, 1993 | November 28, 1995 |
| 60 | 54 | 14 | "Serena Times Two" "Angel or Devil? The Mysterious Girl from the Sky"; Transliteration: "Tenshi? Akuma? Sora kara kita nazo no shōjo" (Japanese: 天使?悪魔?空からきた謎の少女) | Kunihiko Ikuhara | Sukehiro Tomita | Minoru Ōkōchi | Masahiro Andō | June 26, 1993 | October 25, 1995 |
| 61 | 55 | 15 | "The Cosmetic Caper" "Usagi Devastated: Mamoru Declares a Break-Up"; Transliteration: "Usagi daishokku! Mamoru no zekkō sengen" (Japanese: うさぎ大ショック!衛の絶交宣言) | Kōnosuke Uda | Sukehiro Tomita | Kenichi Tajiri | Masahide Yanagisawa | July 3, 1993 | October 26, 1995 |
| 62 | 56 | 16 | "Sailor Mercury Moving On?" "A Guardian's Friendship: Goodbye, Ami"; Transliteration: "Senshi no yūjō! Sayonara Ami-chan" (Japanese: 戦士の友情!さよなら亜美ちゃん) | Harume Kosaka | Katsuyuki Sumisawa | Kazuyuki Hashimoto | Taichi Nakamura | July 10, 1993 | October 27, 1995 |
| 63 | 57 | 17 | "Gramps in a Pickle" "Women Must Be Strong and Beautiful: Rei's New Special Technique"; Transliteration: "Onna wa tsuyoku utsukushiku! Rei no shin hissatsu waza" (Japanese: 女は強く美しく!レイの新必殺技) | Yūji Endō | Shigeru Yanagawa | Yoshiyuki Shikano | Shinya Hasegawa | July 24, 1993 | October 30, 1995 |
| 64 | 58 | 18 | "Trouble Comes Thundering Down" "In Search of the Silver Crystal: Chibi-Usa's Secret"; Transliteration: "Ginzuishou wo motomete! Chibiusa no himitsu" (Japanese: 銀水晶を求めて!ちびうさの秘密) | Takao Yoshizawa | Sukehiro Tomita | Minoru Ōkōchi | Kazuko Tadano | July 31, 1993 | October 31, 1995 |
| 65 | 59 | 19 | "A Charmed Life" "Dispute Over Love: Minako and Makoto's Conflict"; Transliteration: "Koi no ronsō! Minako to Makoto ga tairitsu" (Japanese: 恋の論争!美奈子とまことが対立) | Takuya Igarashi | Megumi Sugihara | Yoshiyuki Shikano | Masahiro Andō | August 14, 1993 | November 1, 1995 |
| 66 | 60 | 20 | "A Curried Favor" "Usagi's Parental Love: The Curry Romance Triangle"; Transliteration: "Usagi no oyagokoro!? Karē na sankaku kankei" (Japanese: うさぎの親心?カレーな三角関係) | Harume Kosaka | Shigeru Yanagawa | Kazuyuki Hashimoto | Katsumi Tamegai | August 21, 1993 | November 2, 1995 |
| 67 | — | 21 | "The Beach, the Island and a Vacation: The Guardians' Break"; Transliteration: "Umi yo, Shima yo, Bakansu yo! Senshi no kyūsoku" (Japanese: 海よ島よバカンスよ!戦士の休息) | Yūji Endō | Katsuyuki Sumisawa | Yoshiyuki Shikano | Taichi Nakamura | August 28, 1993 | — |
| 68 | 61 | 22 | "Naughty 'N' Nice" "Protect Chibi-Usa: Clash of the Ten Warriors"; Transliteration: "Chibiusa wo mamore! Jū senshi no daigekisen" (Japanese: ちびうさを守れ!10戦士の大激戦) | Kunihiko Ikuhara | Sukehiro Tomita | Minoru Ōkōchi | Ikuko Ito | September 11, 1993 | November 3, 1995 |
| 69 | 62 | 23 | "Prediction of Doom" "Awaken the Sleeping Beauty: Mamoru's Distress"; Transliteration: "Mezame yo nemureru bishōjo! Mamoru no kunō" (Japanese: 目覚めよ眠れる美少女!衛の苦悩) | Takao Yoshizawa | Sukehiro Tomita | Yoshiyuki Shikano | Kazuko Tadano | September 25, 1993 | November 6, 1995 |
| 70 | 63 | 24 | "Enemies No More" "Battle of the Flames of Love! Mars vs. Koan"; Transliteration: "Ai no honō no taiketsu! Māzu tai Kōan" (Japanese: 愛の炎の対決!マーズVSコーアン) | Kōnosuke Uda | Katsuyuki Sumisawa | Minoru Ōkōchi | Hisashi Kagawa | October 2, 1993 | November 7, 1995 |
| 71 | 64 | 25 | "Checkmate" "For Friendship! Ami vs. Berthier"; Transliteration: "Yūjō no tame! Ami to Beruche gekitotsu" (Japanese: 友情のため!亜美とベルチェ激突) | Harume Kosaka | Shigeru Yanagawa | Kenichi Tajiri | Masahiro Andō | October 16, 1993 | November 8, 1995 |
| 72 | 65 | 26 | "Sibling Rivalry" "Rubeus the Heartless: The Tragic Sisters"; Transliteration: "Hijō no Rubeusu! Kanashimi no yon shimai" (Japanese: 非情のルベウス!悲しみの四姉妹) | Noriyo Sasaki | Megumi Sugihara | Kazuyuki Hashimoto | Katsumi Tamegai | October 30, 1993 | November 9, 1995 |
| 73 | 66 | 27 | "Rubeus Evens the Score (Part 1 of 2)" "A UFO Appears: The Sailor Guardians Abducted"; Transliteration: "Yūfō shutsugen! Sarawareta Sērā Senshi-tachi" (Japanese: UFO出現!さらわれたセーラー戦士たち) | Yūji Endō | Katsuyuki Sumisawa | Yoshiyuki Shikano | Taichi Nakamura | November 6, 1993 | September 20, 1997 |
| 74 | 67 | 28 | "Rubeus Strikes Back (Part 2 of 2)" "Defeat Rubeus: The Battle in Space"; Transliteration: "Rubeusu wo taose! Uchūkūkan no kessen" (Japanese: ルベウスを倒せ!宇宙空間の決戦) | Hiroki Shibata | Katsuyuki Sumisawa | Kenichi Tajiri | Katsumi Tamegai | November 13, 1993 | September 27, 1997 |
| 75 | 68 | 29 | "The Secret of the Luna Sphere" "The Mysterious New Guardian: Sailor Pluto Appears"; Transliteration: "Nazo no shin Senshi, Sērā Purūtō tōjō" (Japanese: 謎の新戦士, セーラープルート登場) | Takuya Igarashi | Shigeru Yanagawa | Yoshiyuki Shikano | Masahiro Andō | November 20, 1993 | October 4, 1997 |
| 76 | 69 | 30 | "Emerald Takes Over" "Magic of Darkness: Esmeraude's Invasion"; Transliteration: "Ankoku no maryoku! Esmerōdo no shinryaku" (Japanese: 暗黒の魔力!エスメロードの侵略) | Tsunekiyo Otani | Megumi Sugihara | Kazuyuki Hashimoto | Taichi Nakamura | December 4, 1993 | October 11, 1997 |
| 77 | 70 | 31 | "Promises Fulfilled" "Shared Feelings: Usagi and Mamoru in Love Once Again"; Transliteration: "Omoi wa onaji! Usagi to Mamoru no ai futatabi" (Japanese: 想いは同じ!うさぎと衛の愛再び) | Harume Kosaka | Sukehiro Tomita | Yoshiyuki Shikano | Hideyuki Motohashi | December 11, 1993 | October 18, 1997 |
| 78 | 71 | 32 | "No Thanks, Nurse Venus!" "Venus Minako's Nurse Mayhem"; Transliteration: "Vīnasu Minako no nāsu daisōdō" (Japanese: ヴィーナス美奈子のナース大騒動) | Noriyo Sasaki | Katsuyuki Sumisawa | Kenichi Tajiri | Masahiro Andō | December 18, 1993 | October 25, 1997 |
| 79 | 72 | 33 | "Dog Day for Artemis" "Artemis' Adventure: The Monster Animal Kingdom"; Transliteration: "Arutemisu no bōken! Ma no dōbutsu ōkoku" (Japanese: アルテミスの冒険!魔の動物王国) | Yūji Endō | Shigeru Yanagawa | Yoshiyuki Shikano | Katsumi Tamegai | December 25, 1993 | November 1, 1997 |
| 80 | 73 | 34 | "Smart Payoff" "The Terrifying Illusion: Ami All Alone"; Transliteration: "Kyōfu no gen'ei! Hitoribocchi no Ami" (Japanese: 恐怖の幻影!ひとりぼっちの亜美) | Hiroki Shibata | Sukehiro Tomita | Kazuyuki Hashimoto | Hideyuki Motohashi | January 8, 1994 | November 7, 1997 |
| 81 | 74 | 35 | "Child's Play" "The Dark Gate is Completed? The Targeted Elementary School"; Transliteration: "Ankoku gēto kansei? Nerawareta shōgakkō" (Japanese: 暗黒ゲート完成?狙われた小学校) | Kōnosuke Uda | Shigeru Yanagawa | Kazuhisa Asai | Taichi Nakamura | January 15, 1994 | November 11, 1997 |
| 82 | 75 | 36 | "Future Shocked" "Journey to the Future: Battle in the Space-Time Corridor"; Transliteration: "Mirai he no tabidachi! Jikū kairō no tatakai" (Japanese: 未来への旅立ち!時空回廊の戦い) | Harume Kosaka | Katsuyuki Sumisawa | Kenichi Tajiri | Hideyuki Motohashi | January 22, 1994 | November 12, 1997 |
| 83 | 76 | 37 | "The Legend of Black Moon" "The Shocking Future: Demande's Dark Ambition"; Transliteration: "Shōgeki no mirai! Demando no kuroki yabō" (Japanese: 衝撃の未来!デマンドの黒き野望) | Noriyo Sasaki | Sukehiro Tomita | Yoshiyuki Shikano | Masahiro Andō | January 29, 1994 | November 13, 1997 |
| 84 | 77 | 38 | "Jealousy's Just Reward" "Wiseman's Evil Hand: Chibi-Usa Disappears"; Transliteration: "Waizuman no mashu! Chibiusa shōmetsu" (Japanese: ワイズマンの魔手!ちびうさ消滅) | Yūji Endō | Megumi Sugihara | Kazuyuki Hashimoto | Katsumi Tamegai | February 5, 1994 | November 14, 1997 |
| 85 | 78 | 39 | "The Birth of Wicked Lady" "The Dark Queen: Birth of Black Lady"; Transliteration: "Ankoku no joō, Burakku Redi no tanjō" (Japanese: 暗黒の女王, ブラックレディの誕生) | Hiroki Shibata | Sukehiro Tomita | Kenichi Tajiri | Hisashi Kagawa | February 12, 1994 | November 17, 1997 |
| 86 | 79 | 40 | "Brotherly Love" "Saphir Dies: Wiseman's Trap"; Transliteration: "Safīru zetsumei! Waizuman no wana" (Japanese: サフィール絶命!ワイズマンの罠) | Kōnosuke Uda | Katsuyuki Sumisawa | Kenichi Tajiri | Shinya Hasegawa | February 19, 1994 | November 18, 1997 |
| 87 | 80 | 41 | "Diamond in the Rough" "Believing in Love and the Future: Usagi's Decision"; Transliteration: "Ai to mirai wo shinjite! Usagi no kesshin" (Japanese: 愛と未来を信じて!うさぎの決心) | Harume Kosaka | Sukehiro Tomita | Kazuhisa Asai | Taichi Nakamura | February 26, 1994 | November 19, 1997 |
| 88 | 81 | 42 | "The Final Battle" "The Final Battle Between Light and Dark: Pledge of Love to the Future"; Transliteration: "Hikari to yami no saishū kessen! Mirai he chikau ai" (Japanese: 光と闇の最終決戦!未来へ誓う愛) | Takuya Igarashi | Sukehiro Tomita | Kazuyuki Hashimoto | Kazuko Tadano | March 5, 1994 | November 20, 1997 |
| 89 | 82 | 43 | "Follow the Leader" "Usagi and the Girls' Resolve: Prelude to a New Battle"; Transliteration: "Usagi-tachi no ketsui! Atarashiki tatakai no jokyoku" (Japanese: うさぎ達の決意!新しき戦いの序曲) | Kōnosuke Uda | Katsuyuki Sumisawa | — | — | March 12, 1994 | November 21, 1997 |

=== Season 3: S (1994–95) ===
| No. overall | No. in season | Cloverway title Original Japanese and Viz titles | Directed by | Written by | Art director(s) | Animation director(s) | Original release date | English air date |
|---|---|---|---|---|---|---|---|---|
| 90 | 1 | "Star Struck, Bad Luck" "Premonition of the Apocalypse: The Mysterious New Guardians Appear"; Transliteration: "Chikyū hōkai no yokan? Nazo no shin Senshi shutsugen" (Japanese: 地球崩壊の予感?謎の新戦士出現) | Junichi Sato | Sukehiro Tomita | Kenichi Tajiri | Masahiro Andō | March 19, 1994 | June 12, 2000 |
| 91 | 2 | "Crystal Clear Again" "The Rod of Love is Born: Usagi's New Transformation"; Transliteration: "Ai no roddo tanjō! Usagi no shin henshin" (Japanese: 愛のロッド誕生!うさぎの新変身) | Yūji Endō | Shigeru Yanagawa | Yoshiyuki Shikano | Katsumi Tamegai | March 26, 1994 | June 13, 2000 |
| 92 | 3 | "Driving Dangerously" "A Handsome Boy? Haruka Tenoh's Secret"; Transliteration: "Suteki na bishōnen? Ten'ō Haruka no himitsu" (Japanese: 素敵な美少年?天王はるかの秘密) | Kunihiko Ikuhara | Katsuyuki Sumisawa | Kazuhisa Asai | Hisashi Kagawa | April 16, 1994 | June 14, 2000 |
| 93 | 4 | "Bad Harmony" "Usagi's Idol: The Graceful Genius Michiru"; Transliteration: "Usagi no akogare! Yūbi no tensai Michiru" (Japanese: うさぎの憧れ!優美な天才みちる) | Hiroki Shibata | Megumi Sugihara | Kazuyuki Hashimoto | Taichi Nakamura | April 23, 1994 | June 15, 2000 |
| 94 | 5 | "Swept Off Her Feet" "Protect the Pure Heart: The Three-Way Battle"; Transliteration: "Pyua na kokoro wo mamore! Teki mikata mittsu tomoe ransen" (Japanese: 純な心を守れ!敵味方三つ巴乱戦) | Noriyo Sasaki | Sukehiro Tomita | Kenichi Tajiri | Ikuko Itō | April 30, 1994 | June 16, 2000 |
| 95 | 6 | "Blinded By Love's Light" "Let Moon Help with Your Love Problems"; Transliteration: "Koi no otasuke wa Mūn ni omakase" (Japanese: 恋のおたすけはムーンにおまかせ) | Harume Kosaka | Shigeru Yanagawa | Yoshiyuki Shikano | Mari Tominaga | May 7, 1994 | June 19, 2000 |
| 96 | 7 | "Lita Borrows Trouble" "Coldhearted Uranus: Makoto in Danger"; Transliteration: "Reikoku na Uranusu? Makoto no pinchi" (Japanese: 冷酷なウラヌス?まことのピンチ) | Kōnosuke Uda | Yoji Enokido | Kazuhisa Asai | Masahiro Andō | May 14, 1994 | June 20, 2000 |
| 97 | 8 | "Damp Spirits" "The Labyrinth of Water: Ami Targeted"; Transliteration: "Mizu no rabirinsu! Nerawareta Ami" (Japanese: 水のラビリンス!ねらわれた亜美) | Junichi Sato | Megumi Sugihara | Kazuyuki Hashimoto | Katsumi Tamegai | May 21, 1994 | June 21, 2000 |
| 98 | 9 | "Friendly Foes" "To Save Our Friends: Moon and Uranus Join Forces"; Transliteration: "Tomodachi wo sukue! Mūn Uranusu rengō" (Japanese: 友達を救え!ムーンウラヌス連合) | Yūji Endō | Sukehiro Tomita | Kenichi Tajiri | Taichi Nakamura | May 28, 1994 | June 22, 2000 |
| 99 | 10 | "Mixed Emotions" "A Man’s Kindness: Yuichiro, Heartbroken by Rei"; Transliteration: "Otoko no yasashisa! Yūichirō, Rei ni shitsuren?" (Japanese: 男の優しさ!雄一郎, レイに失恋?) | Harume Kosaka | Megumi Sugihara | Yoshiyuki Shikano | Shinya Hasegawa | June 18, 1994 | June 23, 2000 |
| 100 | 11 | "Individual Happiness" "I Want to Quit Being a Sailor Guardian: Minako's Dilemma"; Transliteration: "Sērā Senshi wo yametai!? Minako no nayami" (Japanese: S戦士を辞めたい!?美奈子の悩み) | Hiroki Shibata | Yoji Enokido | Kazuhisa Asai | Mari Tominaga | June 25, 1994 | June 26, 2000 |
| 101 | 12 | "Birthday Blues, Part 1" "Usagi in Tears: A Glass Slipper for My Birthday"; Transliteration: "Usagi namida! Tanjōbi ni garasu no kutsu wo" (Japanese: うさぎ涙!誕生日にガラスの靴を) | Yūji Endō | Katsuyuki Sumisawa | Kazuyuki Hashimoto | Masahiro Andō | July 2, 1994 | June 27, 2000 |
| 102 | 13 | "Birthday Blues, Part 2" "The Stolen Pure Heart: Usagi's Crisis"; Transliteration: "Ubawareta pyua na kokoro! Usagi zettai zetsumei" (Japanese: 奪われた純な心!うさぎ絶体絶命) | Noriyo Sasaki | Katsuyuki Sumisawa | Kenichi Tajiri | Taichi Nakamura | July 16, 1994 | June 28, 2000 |
| 103 | 14 | "Hello, Sailor Mini Moon" "The Arrival of a Tiny Pretty Guardian"; Transliteration: "Yatte kita chiccha na Bishōjo Senshi" (Japanese: やって来たちっちゃな美少女戦士) | Kunihiko Ikuhara | Shigeru Yanagawa | Yoshiyuki Shikano | Kazuya Kuroda | August 6, 1994 | June 29, 2000 |
| 104 | 15 | "Tainted Tea Party" "Making New Friends: Chibi Moon's Adventure"; Transliteration: "Tomodachi wo motomete! Chibi Mūn no katsuyaku" (Japanese: 友達を求めて!ちびムーンの活躍) | Junichi Sato | Megumi Sugihara | Kazuhisa Asai | Ikuko Itō | August 20, 1994 | June 30, 2000 |
| 105 | 16 | "People Who Need People" "I Want Power: Mako Lost in Doubt"; Transliteration: "Pawā ga hoshī! Mako-chan no mayoi michi" (Japanese: 力が欲しい!まこちゃんの迷い道) | Hiroki Shibata | Shigeru Yanagawa | Yoshiyuki Shikano | Mari Tominaga | August 27, 1994 | July 3, 2000 |
| 106 | 17 | "Related By Destiny" "The Bond of Destiny: Uranus' Distant Past"; Transliteration: "Unmei no kizuna! Uranusu no tōi hi" (Japanese: 運命のきずな!ウラヌスの遠い日) | Takuya Igarashi | Yoji Enokido | Kenichi Tajiri | Katsumi Tamegai | September 3, 1994 | July 4, 2000 |
| 107 | 18 | "Art Appreciation" "Art is an Explosion of Love: Chibiusa’s First Love"; Transliteration: "Geijutsu wa ai no bakuhatsu! Chibiusa no hatsukoi" (Japanese: 芸術は愛の爆発!ちびうさの初恋) | Yūji Endō | Katsuyuki Sumisawa | Minoru Ōkōchi | Taichi Nakamura | September 10, 1994 | July 5, 2000 |
| 108 | 19 | "Everything's Coming Up Rosey" "Usagi Dancing to the Waltz"; Transliteration: "Usagi no dansu wa warutsu ni notte" (Japanese: うさぎのダンスはワルツに乗って) | Harume Kosaka | Megumi Sugihara | Kazuhisa Asai | Masahiro Andō | September 17, 1994 | July 6, 2000 |
| 109 | 20 | "No Turning Back" "The Shocking Moment: Everyone’s Identities Revealed"; Transliteration: "Shōgeki no toki! Akasareta tagai no shōtai" (Japanese: 衝撃の刻!明かされた互いの正体) | Junichi Sato | Sukehiro Tomita | Yoshiyuki Shikano | Kazuya Kuroda | September 24, 1994 | July 7, 2000 |
| 110 | 21 | "Destiny's Arrival" "The Death of Uranus and Neptune: The Talismans Appear"; Transliteration: "Uranusu-tachi no shi? Tarisuman shutsugen" (Japanese: ウラヌス達の死?タリスマン出現) | Kunihiko Ikuhara | Yoji Enokido | Kenichi Tajiri | Mari Tominaga | October 15, 1994 | July 10, 2000 |
| 111 | 22 | "The Purity Chalice" "The Holy Grail's Mystical Power: Moon's Double Transformation"; Transliteration: "Seihai no shinpi na chikara! Mūn nidan henshin" (Japanese: 聖杯の神秘な力!ムーン二段変身) | Hiroki Shibata | Sukehiro Tomita | Kazuyuki Hashimoto | Ikuko Itō | October 22, 1994 | July 11, 2000 |
| 112 | 23 | "Show Stoppers" "Who is the True Messiah? Chaos of Light and Darkness"; Transliteration: "Shin no Meshia wa dare? Hikari to kage no kaosu" (Japanese: 真の救世主は誰?光と影のカオス) | Noriyo Sasaki | Shigeru Yanagawa | Minoru Ōkōchi | Shinya Hasegawa | November 5, 1994 | July 12, 2000 |
| 113 | 24 | "Rini's Risky Friendship" "A House Filled with Evil Presence: The Beautiful Hotaru’s Secret"; Transliteration: "Yōki tadayou ie! Bishōjo Hotaru no himitsu" (Japanese: 妖気漂う家!美少女ほたるの秘密) | Kōnosuke Uda | Megumi Sugihara | Kenichi Tajiri | Taichi Nakamura | November 12, 1994 | July 13, 2000 |
| 114 | 25 | "Mimet's Mess" "I Love Idols: Mimete's Dilemma"; Transliteration: "Aidoru daisuki! Nayameru Mimetto" (Japanese: アイドル大好き!悩めるミメット) | Harume Kosaka | Yoji Enokido | Yoshiyuki Shikano | Masahiro Andō | November 19, 1994 | July 14, 2000 |
| 115 | 26 | "The Shadow of Silence" "Shadow of Silence: The Pale Glimmer of a Firefly"; Transliteration: "Chinmoku no kage!? Awaki Hotaru bi no yurameki" (Japanese: 沈黙の影!?あわき蛍火のゆらめき) | Takuya Igarashi | Yoji Enokido | Kenichi Tajiri | Katsumi Tamegai | November 26, 1994 | July 17, 2000 |
| 116 | 27 | "Thorny Weather" "Sunny Skies After a Storm: A Friendship Dedicated to Hotaru"; Transliteration: "Arashi nochi hare! Hotaru ni sasageru yūjō" (Japanese: 嵐のち晴れ!ほたるに捧げる友情) | Yūji Endō | Megumi Sugihara | Kazuhisa Asai | Jouji Yanase | December 3, 1994 | July 18, 2000 |
| 117 | 28 | "Heightened Hazard" "Higher and Stronger: A Cheer from Usagi"; Transliteration: "Yori takaku, yori tsuyoku! Usagi no ōen" (Japanese: より高くより強く!うさぎの応援) | Kunihiko Ikuhara | Shigeru Yanagawa | Minoru Ōkōchi | Taichi Nakamura | December 10, 1994 | July 19, 2000 |
| 118 | 29 | "It's in the Cards" "The Battle Inside the Demonic Space: The Sailor Guardians' Gamble"; Transliteration: "Makū no tatakai! Sērā Senshi no kake" (Japanese: 魔空の戦い!セーラー戦士の賭け) | Noriyo Sasaki | Katsuyuki Sumisawa | Kenichi Tajiri | Masahide Yanagisawa | December 17, 1994 | July 20, 2000 |
| 119 | 30 | "Goodness Eclipsed" "The Messiah of Silence Awakens? Stars of Destiny"; Transliteration: "Chinmoku no Meshia kakusei? Unmei no hoshiboshi" (Japanese: 沈黙のメシアの覚せい?運命の星々) | Harume Kosaka | Yoji Enokido | Kazuhisa Asai | Shinya Hasegawa | December 24, 1994 | September 13, 2000 |
| 120 | 31 | "Next in Line" "An Invasion from another Dimension: Mystery of Infinity Academy"; Transliteration: "Ijigen kara no shinryaku! Mugen Gakuen no nazo" (Japanese: 異次元からの侵略!無限学園の謎) | Kōnosuke Uda | Megumi Sugihara | Minoru Ōkōchi | Katsumi Tamegai | January 7, 1995 | July 21, 2000 |
| 121 | 32 | "Fiendish Ferns" "A Heart-Snatching Demon Flower: Tellu, the Third Witch"; Transliteration: "Kokoro wo ubau yōka! Daisan no majō, Teruru" (Japanese: 心を奪う妖花!第三の魔女,テルル) | Takuya Igarashi | Shigeru Yanagawa | Kazuyuki Hashimoto | Taichi Nakamura | January 14, 1995 | July 24, 2000 |
| 122 | 33 | "The Science of Love" "Believe in Love: Ami, the Kindhearted Guardian"; Transliteration: "Ai wo shinjite! Ami, kokoro yasashiki Senshi" (Japanese: 愛を信じて!亜美心優しき戦士) | Yūji Endō | Sukehiro Tomita | Kenichi Tajiri | Hideyuki Motohashi | January 21, 1995 | July 25, 2000 |
| 123 | 34 | "Wake Up Call" "Shadows of Destruction: The Messiah of Silence Awakens"; Transliteration: "Hametsu no kage! Chinmoku no Meshia no mezame" (Japanese: 破滅の影!沈黙のメシアの目覚め) | Harume Kosaka | Megumi Sugihara | Minoru Ōkōchi | Mari Tominaga | January 28, 1995 | July 26, 2000 |
| 124 | 35 | "Who's Really Who?" "The Imminent Terror of Darkness: Struggles of the Eight Guardians"; Transliteration: "Semari kuru yami no kyōfu! Kusen no Hassenshi" (Japanese: 迫り来る闇の恐怖!苦戦の8戦士) | Takuya Igarashi | Yoji Enokido | Kazuyuki Hashimoto | Ikuko Itō | February 4, 1995 | July 28, 2000 |
| 125 | 36 | "Darkness, My Old Friend" "The Shining Shooting Star: Saturn and the Messiah"; Transliteration: "Kagayaku ryūsei! Satān soshite Meshia" (Japanese: 輝く流星!サターンそして救世主) | Kōnosuke Uda | Yoji Enokido | Kenichi Tajiri | Ikuko Itō | February 11, 1995 | July 29, 2000 |
| 126 | 37 | "Second Chance" "A New Life: Parting of the Stars of Destiny"; Transliteration: "Atarashiki inochi! Unmei no hoshiboshi wakare no toki" (Japanese: 新しき生命!運命の星々別離の時) | Yūji Endō | Megumi Sugihara | Kazuhisa Asai | Taichi Nakamura | February 18, 1995 | July 30, 2000 |
| 127 | 38 | "Tough Kindness" "A Guardian’s Realization: Strength Lies Within a Pure Heart"; Transliteration: "Senshi no jikaku! Tsuyosa wa pyua na kokoro no naka ni" (Japanese: 戦士の自覚! 強さは純な心の中に) | Harume Kosaka | Sukehiro Tomita | TBA | Masahiro Ando | February 25, 1995 | August 1, 2000 |

=== Season 4: SuperS (1995–96) ===
| No. overall | No. in season | Cloverway title Original Japanese and Viz titles | Directed by | Written by | Art director(s) | Animation director(s) | Original release date | English air date |
|---|---|---|---|---|---|---|---|---|
| 128 | 1 | "Dreams Take Flight" "Meeting of Destiny: The Night Pegasus Dances"; Transliteration: "Unmei no deai! Pegasasu no mau yoru" (Japanese: 運命の出会い!ペガサスの舞う夜) | Kunihiko Ikuhara | Yoji Enokido | Kazuyuki Hashimoto | Katsumi Tamegai | March 4, 1995 | September 26, 2000 |
| 129 | 2 | "No Ordinary Horsepower" "Super Transformation Once Again: Pegasus' Power"; Transliteration: "Supā henshin futatabi! Pegasasu no pawā" (Japanese: スーパー変身再び!ペガサスの力) | Noriyo Sasaki | Megumi Sugihara | Kenichi Tajiri | Mari Tominaga | March 11, 1995 | September 27, 2000 |
| 130 | 3 | "Sweet Dreams" "Protect Mom's Dream: Double Moon's New Attack"; Transliteration: "Mamore haha no yume! Daburu Mūn no shin hissatsu waza" (Japanese: 守れ母の夢!Wムーンの新必殺技) | Hiroki Shibata | Ryota Yamaguchi | Kazuhisa Asai | Hisashi Kagawa | March 18, 1995 | September 28, 2000 |
| 131 | 4 | "Baiting the Trap" "Catch Pegasus: The Amazon's Trap"; Transliteration: "Pegasasu wo toraero! Amazon no wana" (Japanese: ペガサスを捕えろ!アマゾンの罠) | Yūji Endō | Genki Yoshimura | Minoru Ōkōchi | Shinya Hasegawa | March 25, 1995 | September 29, 2000 |
| 132 | 5 | "Perfect Couple" "The Perfect Couple: Usagi and Mamoru's Love"; Transliteration: "Oniai no futari! Usagi to Mamoru no ai" (Japanese: お似合いの二人!うさぎと衛の愛) | Junichi Sato | Yōji Enokido | Kazuhisa Asai | Masahiro Andō | April 15, 1995 | October 2, 2000 |
| 133 | 6 | "Much Ado About Kitten" "Artemis is Cheating? Enter the Mysterious Kitten"; Transliteration: "Arutemisu no uwaki? Nazo no koneko tōjō" (Japanese: アルテミスの浮気?謎の子猫登場) | Harume Kosaka | Megumi Sugihara | Kenichi Tajiri | Mari Tominaga | April 29, 1995 | October 3, 2000 |
| 134 | 7 | "A Pegasus Page Turner" "Makoto's Friendship: A Girl Who Admired Pegasus"; Transliteration: "Makoto no yūjō! Tenba ni akogareta shōjo" (Japanese: まことの友情!天馬に憧れた少女) | Hiroki Shibata | Ryōta Yamaguchi | Minoru Ōkōchi | Katsumi Tamegai | May 13, 1995 | October 4, 2000 |
| 135 | 8 | "A Teacher's Lesson" "Connecting Hearts: Chibiusa and Pegasus"; Transliteration: "Fureau kokoro! Chibiusa to Pegasasu" (Japanese: 触れ合う心!ちびうさとペガサス) | Noriyo Sasaki | Yoji Enokido | Kazuyuki Hashimoto | Hisashi Kagawa | May 20, 1995 | October 5, 2000 |
| 136 | 9 | "The Trouble with Love" "Protect Mamoru: Ninja Usagi's Jealousy"; Transliteration: "Mamoru wo mamore! Ninja Usagi no yakimochi" (Japanese: 衛を守れ!忍者うさぎのヤキモチ) | Yūji Endō | Megumi Sugihara | Kazuhisa Asai | Shinya Hasegawa | May 27, 1995 | October 6, 2000 |
| 137 | 10 | "Phony Fairy" "Forest of Illusion: A Beautiful Fairy's Invitation"; Transliteration: "Ayakashi no mori! Utsukushiki yōsei no izanai" (Japanese: あやかしの森!美しき妖精の誘い) | Kunihiko Ikuhara | Genki Yoshimura | Kenichi Tajiri | Taichi Nakamura | June 3, 1995 | October 9, 2000 |
| 138 | 11 | "Driven Dreamer" "Drive to the Heavens: The Dream Car Fueled with Love"; Transliteration: "Tengoku made hashire! Yume no kuruma ni kakeru ai" (Japanese: 天国まで走れ!夢の車にかける愛) | Hiroki Shibata | Ryota Yamaguchi | Minoru Ōkōchi | Masahiro Andō | June 10, 1995 | October 10, 2000 |
| 139 | 12 | "Cutting it Close" "Aiming for the Top: The Pretty Swordswoman's Dilemma"; Transliteration: "Mezase Nippon ichi! Bishōjo kenshi no nayami" (Japanese: 目指せ日本一!美少女剣士の悩み) | Harume Kosaka | Mutsuri Nakano | Kazuyuki Hashimoto | Ikuko Itō | June 17, 1995 | October 11, 2000 |
| 140 | 13 | "Clothes Call" "We Love Fashion: The Stylish Guardians"; Transliteration: "Mini ga daisuki! Oshare na Senshitachi" (Japanese: ミニが大好き!おしゃれな戦士達) | Junichi Sato | Genki Yoshimura | Kazuhisa Asai | Mari Tominaga | July 1, 1995 | October 12, 2000 |
| 141 | 14 | "Double Trouble" "Storm of Love: Minako's Grand Two-Timing Plan"; Transliteration: "Koi no arashi! Minako no futamata daisakusen" (Japanese: 恋の嵐!美奈子のフタマタ大作戦) | Takuya Igarashi | Ryota Yamaguchi | Kenichi Tajiri | Hisashi Kagawa | July 8, 1995 | October 13, 2000 |
| 142 | 15 | "Recipe for Danger" "The Secret Mansion: A Menu of Love for You"; Transliteration: "Himitsu no yakata! Ai no menyū wo anata ni" (Japanese: 秘密の館!愛のメニューを貴方に) | Yūji Endō | Megumi Sugihara | Minoru Ōkōchi | Katsumi Tamegai | July 15, 1995 | October 16, 2000 |
| 143 | 16 | "Kicking into High Gear" "Believe in Pegasus: The Four Guardians' Super Transformation"; Transliteration: "Pegasasu wo shinjiru toki! Yon Senshi no supā henshin" (Japanese: 天馬を信じる時!4戦士の超変身) | Noriyo Sasaki | Yoji Enokido | Kazuyuki Hashimoto | Taichi Nakamura | July 22, 1995 | October 17, 2000 |
| 144 | 17 | "Beach Blanket Bungle" "Shining Summer Days: Ami Under the Sea-Breeze"; Transliteration: "Kirameku natsu no hi! Shiokaze no shōjo Ami" (Japanese: きらめく夏の日!潮風の少女亜美) | Hiroki Shibata | Ryota Yamaguchi | Kazuhisa Asai | Masahiro Andō | August 12, 1995 | October 18, 2000 |
| 145 | 18 | "Tutu Treachery" "Become a Prima: Usagi's Ballet"; Transliteration: "Purima wo nerae! Usagi no barei" (Japanese: プリマをねらえ!うさぎのバレエ) | Harume Kosaka | Genki Yoshimura | Kenichi Tajiri | Mari Tominaga | August 19, 1995 | October 19, 2000 |
| 146 | 19 | "The Duchess' Day Off" "Juban Holiday: The Carefree Princess"; Transliteration: "Jūbangai no kyūjitsu! Mujaki na ōjosama" (Japanese: 十番街の休日!無邪気な王女様) | Junichi Sato | Megumi Sugihara | Minoru Ōkōchi | Miho Shimogasa | August 26, 1995 | October 20, 2000 |
| 147 | 20 | "No Prince Charming" "Destined Partners? Makoto's Innocence"; Transliteration: "Unmei no pātonā? Makoto no junjō" (Japanese: 運命のパートナー?まことの純情) | Yūji Endō | Ryota Yamaguchi | Kazuyuki Hashimoto | Hisashi Kagawa | September 2, 1995 | October 23, 2000 |
| 148 | 21 | "A True Reflection" "Shadow of Evil: The Trio's Last Chance"; Transliteration: "Kyoaku no kage! Oitsumerareta torio" (Japanese: 巨悪の影!追いつめられたトリオ) | Kōnosuke Uda | Yoji Enokido | Kazuhisa Asai | Taichi Nakamura | September 23, 1995 | October 24, 2000 |
| 149 | 22 | "Eternal Dreams" "Mirrors of Dreams: The Amazon's Last Stage"; Transliteration: "Yume no kagami! Amazon saigo no sutēji" (Japanese: 夢の鏡!アマゾン最後のステージ) | Hiroki Shibata | Yoji Enokido | Kenichi Tajiri | Katsumi Tamegai | October 21, 1995 | October 25, 2000 |
| 150 | 23 | "A New Nightmare" "The Amazoness: Nightmare from Behind the Mirrors"; Transliteration: "Amazonesu! Kagami no ura kara kita akumu" (Japanese: アマゾネス!鏡の裏から来た悪夢) | Kunihiko Ikuhara | Yoji Enokido | Minoru Ōkōchi | Masahiro Andō | October 28, 1995 | October 26, 2000 |
| 151 | 24 | "Heartfelt Melody" "True Power Explodes: Ami's Melody of the Heart"; Transliteration: "Shin no pawā bakuhatsu! Ami kokoro no shirabe" (Japanese: 真のパワー爆発!亜美心のしらべ) | Takuya Igarashi | Ryota Yamaguchi | Kazuyuki Hashimoto | Mari Tominaga | November 4, 1995 | October 27, 2000 |
| 152 | 25 | "Dreams of Her Own" "Flames of Passion: Mars' Raging Super Attack"; Transliteration: "Honō no jōnetsu! Māzu ikari no chōhissatsu waza" (Japanese: 炎の情熱!マーズ怒りの超必殺技) | Harume Kosaka | Megumi Sugihara | Kazuhisa Asai | Ikuko Itō | November 11, 1995 | December 21, 2000 |
| 153 | 26 | "Dental Dilemma" "Dentist of Horrors? PallaPalla's House"; Transliteration: "Kyōfu no haishasan? ParaPara no yakata" (Japanese: 恐怖の歯医者さん?パラパラの館) | Noriyo Sasaki | Genki Yoshimura | Kazuyuki Hashimoto | Masahiro Andō | November 18, 1995 | October 30, 2000 |
| 154 | 27 | "Nightmare Garden" "Clash of Dreams: Minako and Makoto's Broken Friendship"; Transliteration: "Yume taiketsu! Minako to Makoto zekkō sengen" (Japanese: 夢対決!美奈子とまこと絶交宣言) | Yūji Endō | Ryota Yamaguchi | Kazuhisa Asai | Shigetaka Kiyoyama | November 25, 1995 | October 31, 2000 |
| 155 | 28 | "Vaulting to Victory" "Overcome Your Fear: The Jump to Freedom"; Transliteration: "Kyōfu wo koete! Jiyū he no jampu" (Japanese: 恐怖を越えて!自由へのジャンプ) | Kōnosuke Uda | Megumi Sugihara | Minoru Ōkōchi | Miho Shimogasa | December 2, 1995 | November 1, 2000 |
| 156 | 29 | "Reflections of Reality" "Don't Lose Sight of Your Dreams: The Mirror of Truth"; Transliteration: "Yume wo miushinawanaide! Shinjitsu wo utsusu kagami" (Japanese: 夢を見失わないで!真実を映す鏡) | Takuya Igarashi | Genki Yoshimura | Kazuhisa Asai | Katsumi Tamegai | December 9, 1995 | November 2, 2000 |
| 157 | 30 | "Dream Believer" "Pegasus Disappears: Wavering Friendship"; Transliteration: "Pegasasu ga kieta!? Yure ugoku yūjō" (Japanese: ペガサスが消えた!?ゆれ動く友情) | Harume Kosaka | Ryota Yamaguchi | Kazuyuki Hashimoto | Yūji Kondō | December 16, 1995 | November 3, 2000 |
| 158 | 31 | "Pegasus Revealed" "Pegasus' Secret: The Boy Who Protects the Dream World"; Transliteration: "Pegasasu no himitsu! Yume sekai wo mamoru bishōnen" (Japanese: 天馬の秘密!夢世界を守る美少年) | Junichi Sato | Genki Yoshimura | Minoru Ōkōchi | Mamoru Kurosawa | December 23, 1995 | November 6, 2000 |
| 159 | 32 | "Rini's Lovely Rhapsody" "Chibi-Usa's Little Rhapsody of Love"; Transliteration: "Chibiusa no chiisana koi no rapusodi" (Japanese: ちびうさの小さな恋のラプソディ) | Kunihiko Ikuhara | Megumi Sugihara | Kazuhisa Asai | Ikuko Itō | January 13, 1996 | November 7, 2000 |
| 160 | 33 | "Tomorrow's Big Dreams" "Dream to Be an Adult: The Amazoness' Confusion"; Transliteration: "Otona ni naru yume! Amazonesu no tōwaku" (Japanese: 大人になる夢!アマゾネスの当惑) | Harume Kosaka | Megumi Sugihara | Kenichi Tajiri | Masahiro Andō | January 20, 1996 | November 8, 2000 |
| 161 | 34 | "Day of Night" "Terror in Motion: The Dark Queen's Evil Hand"; Transliteration: "Ugoki dashita kyōfu! Yami no joō no mashu" (Japanese: 動き出した恐怖!闇の女王の魔手) | Noriyo Sasaki | Genki Yoshimura | Tadao Kubota | Shigetaka Kiyoyama | January 27, 1996 | November 9, 2000 |
| 162 | 35 | "Show Time Showdown" "The Source of Darkness: Dead Moon Circus"; Transliteration: "Yami no shingenchi Deddo Mūn Sākasu" (Japanese: 闇の震源地デッドムーンサーカス) | Yūji Endō | Ryota Yamaguchi | Minoru Ōkōchi | Minako Ito | February 3, 1996 | November 10, 2000 |
| 163 | 36 | "The Dark Legend" "Labyrinth of Mirrors: Chibi Moon Captured"; Transliteration: "Kagami no meikyū! Toraerareta Chibi Mūn" (Japanese: 鏡の迷宮!捕えられたちびムーン) | Harume Kosaka | Yoji Enokido | Kazuyuki Hashimoto | Mari Tominaga | February 10, 1996 | November 13, 2000 |
| 164 | 37 | "One in the Hand" "The Golden Crystal Appears: Nehellenia's Magic"; Transliteration: "Gōruden Kurisutaru shutsugen! Neherenia no maryoku" (Japanese: 黄金水晶出現!ネヘレニアの魔力) | Takuya Igarashi | Yoji Enokido | Kenichi Tajiri | Masahiro Andō | February 17, 1996 | November 14, 2000 |
| 165 | 38 | "Golden Revival" "When the Crystal Shines: The Beautiful Power of Dreams"; Transliteration: "Kurisutaru kagayaku toki! Utsukushiki yume no chikara" (Japanese: クリスタル輝く時!美しき夢の力) | Yūji Endō | Yoji Enokido | Kenichi Tajiri | Takayuki Ushirai | February 24, 1996 | November 15, 2000 |
| 166 | 39 | "The Sweetest Dream" "Dreams Forever: Fill the Heavens with Light"; Transliteration: "Yume yo itsumademo! Hikari, ten ni michite" (Japanese: 夢よいつまでも!光, 天に満ちて) | Kunihiko Ikuhara | Yoji Enokido | Kazuhisa Asai | Ikuko Itō | March 2, 1996 | November 16, 2000 |

=== Season 5: Sailor Stars (1996–97) ===
| No. overall | No. in season | Title | Directed by | Written by | Art director(s) | Animation director(s) | Original release date | Japanese viewers (percentage) |
|---|---|---|---|---|---|---|---|---|
Resurrection of Nehelenia Arc
| 167 | 1 | "The Flower of Nightmares Scatters! The Queen of Darkness Returns"; Transliteration: "Akumu hana wo chirasu toki! Yami no Joō fukkatsu" (Japanese: 悪夢花を散らす時!闇の女王復活) | Takuya Igarashi | Ryōta Yamaguchi | Kenichi Tajiri | Katsumi Tamegai | March 9, 1996 | 12.7 |
| 168 | 2 | "Saturn Awakens! The Ten Sailor Guardians Unite"; Transliteration: "Satān no mezame! Sērā Jū Senshi shūketsu" (Japanese: サターンの目覚め!S10戦士集結) | Harume Kosaka | Genki Yoshimura | Kenichi Tajiri | Shigetaka Kiyoyama | March 23, 1996 | 10.6 |
| 169 | 3 | "The Cursed Mirror! Mamoru Caught in a Nightmare"; Transliteration: "Noroi no makyō! Akumu ni torawareta Mamoru" (Japanese: 呪いの魔鏡!悪夢にとらわれた衛) | Noriyo Sasaki | Genki Yoshimura | Minoru Ōkōchi | Minako Itō | April 13, 1996 | 8.9 |
| 170 | 4 | "Night of Destiny! The Sailor Guardians' Ordeals"; Transliteration: "Unmei no ichiya! Sērā Senshi no kunan" (Japanese: 運命の一夜!セーラー戦士の苦難) | Yuji Endo | Ryōta Yamaguchi | Kazuyuki Hashimoto | Masahiro Andō | April 20, 1996 | 7.2 |
| 171 | 5 | "For Love! The Endless Battle in the Dark World"; Transliteration: "Ai yue ni! Hateshinaki makai no tatakai" (Japanese: 愛ゆえに!果てしなき魔界の戦い) | Hiroki Shibata | Ryōta Yamaguchi | Kenichi Tajiri | Takayuki Gorai | April 27, 1996 | 9.2 |
| 172 | 6 | "Moon Power of Love! The Nightmare Ends"; Transliteration: "Ai no mūn pawā! Akumu no owaru toki" (Japanese: 愛のムーンパワー!悪夢の終わる時) | Junichi Sato | Ryōta Yamaguchi | Kenichi Tajiri | Miho Shimogasa | May 4, 1996 | 7.5 |
Sailor Galaxia Arc
| 173 | 7 | "Farewells and Encounters! The Transitioning Stars of Destiny"; Transliteration: "Wakare to deai! Unmei no hoshiboshi no ryūten" (Japanese: 別れと出会い!運命の星々の流転) | Takuya Igarashi | Ryōta Yamaguchi | Kenichi Tajiri | Yoshihiro Kitano | May 11, 1996 | 10.5 |
| 174 | 8 | "A School Storm! The Transfer Students Are Idols"; Transliteration: "Gakuen ni fuku arashi! Tenkōsei wa aidoru" (Japanese: 学園に吹く嵐!転校生はアイドル) | Harume Kosaka | Kazuhiko Kanbe | Kenichi Tajiri | Minako Itō | May 18, 1996 | 8.5 |
| 175 | 9 | "Becoming an Idol! Minako's Ambition"; Transliteration: "Aidoru wo mezase! Minako no yabō" (Japanese: アイドルをめざせ!美奈子の野望) | Yuji Endo | Atsushi Maekawa | Kazuyuki Hashimoto | Takayuki Gorai | May 25, 1996 | 8.2 |
| 176 | 10 | "Fighter's Secret Identity! The Shocking Super Transformation"; Transliteration: "Faitā no shōtai! Shōgeki no chōhenshin" (Japanese: ファイターの正体!衝撃の超変身) | Noriyo Sasaki | Ryōta Yamaguchi | Kazuhisa Asai | Miho Shimogasa | June 8, 1996 | 9.9 |
| 177 | 11 | "A Star of Dreams and Wishes! Taiki's Transformation"; Transliteration: "Hoshi ni takusu yume to roman! Taiki no henshin" (Japanese: 星に託す夢とロマン!大気の変身) | Hiroki Shibata | Kazuhiko Kanbe | Kenichi Tajiri | Shigetaka Kiyoyama | June 15, 1996 | 9.5 |
| 178 | 12 | "Luna's Discovery: The Real Face of Yaten"; Transliteration: "Luna wa mita!? Aidoru Yaten no sugao" (Japanese: ルナは見た!?アイドル夜天の素顔) | Harume Kosaka | Ryōta Yamaguchi | Kenichi Tajiri | Yoshihiro Kitano | June 22, 1996 | 7.4 |
| 179 | 13 | "Friend or Foe? Star Lights and the Sailor Guardians"; Transliteration: "Teki? Mikata? Sutāraitsu to Sērā Senshi" (Japanese: 敵?味方?スターライツとS戦士) | Yuji Endo | Genki Yoshimura | Kenichi Tajiri | Minako Itō | June 29, 1996 | 8.4 |
| 180 | 14 | "Calling of the Shining Stars: Enter Haruka and Michiru"; Transliteration: "Yobiau hoshi no kagayaki! Haruka-tachi sansen" (Japanese: 呼び合う星の輝き!はるか達参戦) | Takuya Igarashi | Atsushi Maekawa | Kazuyuki Hashimoto | Katsumi Tamegai | July 13, 1996 | 6.2 |
| 181 | 15 | "Seiya and Usagi's Heart-Pounding Date"; Transliteration: "Seiya to Usagi no dokidoki dēto" (Japanese: セイヤとうさぎのドキドキデート) | Junichi Sato | Kazuhiko Kanbe | Kenichi Tajiri | Miho Shimogasa | July 20, 1996 | 4.2 |
| 182 | 16 | "Invaders from Outer Space: The Coming of Siren"; Transliteration: "Uchū kara no shinryaku! Seirēn hirai" (Japanese: 宇宙からの侵略!セイレーン飛来) | Noriyo Sasaki | Ryōta Yamaguchi | Kazuhisa Asai | Shigetaka Kiyoyama | August 3, 1996 | 6.0 |
| 183 | 17 | "The Screaming Dead: Terror of the Camp Monster"; Transliteration: "Shiryō no sakebi? Kyōfu kyampu no kaijin" (Japanese: 死霊の叫び!?恐怖キャンプの怪人) | Hiroki Shibata | Kazuhiko Kanbe | Kenichi Tajiri | Yoshihiro Kitano | August 10, 1996 | 7.4 |
| 184 | 18 | "A Night Alone Together: Usagi in Danger"; Transliteration: "Futarikiri no yoru! Usagi no pinchi" (Japanese: ふたりきりの夜!うさぎのピンチ) | Harume Kosaka | Ryōta Yamaguchi | Hidekazu Nakanishi | Minako Itō | August 17, 1996 | 5.1 |
| 185 | 19 | "Taiki's Song Filled with Passion and Faith"; Transliteration: "Taiki zesshō! Shinjiru kokoro wo uta ni komete" (Japanese: 大気絶唱!信じる心を歌にこめて) | Yuji Endo | Atsushi Maekawa | Kenichi Tajiri | Katsumi Tamegai | August 31, 1996 | 7.6 |
| 186 | 20 | "Chibi-Chibi's Mystery: The Big Noisy Chase"; Transliteration: "Chibichibi no nazo! Osawagase daitsuiseki" (Japanese: ちびちびの謎!おさわがせ大追跡) | Masahiro Hosoda | Genki Yoshimura | Kazuyuki Hashimoto | Michiaki Sugimoto | September 7, 1996 | 7.9 |
| 187 | 21 | "The Shining Power of a Star: Chibi-Chibi's Transformation"; Transliteration: "Kagayaku hoshi no pawā! Chibichibi no henshin" (Japanese: 輝く星のパワー!ちびちびの変身) | Takuya Igarashi | Ryōta Yamaguchi | Kenichi Tajiri | Miho Shimogasa | September 14, 1996 | 8.4 |
| 188 | 22 | "Invitation to Terror: Usagi's Night Flight"; Transliteration: "Kyōfu e no shōtai! Usagi no yakan hikō" (Japanese: 恐怖への招待!うさぎの夜間飛行) | Noriyo Sasaki | Kazuhiko Kanbe | Hidekazu Nakanishi | Shigetaka Kiyoyama | October 12, 1996 | 7.4 |
| 189 | 23 | "Duty or Friendship: Conflict Between the Sailor Guardians"; Transliteration: "Shimei to yūjō no hazama! Sērā Senshi-tachi no tairitsu" (Japanese: 使命と友情の間!S戦士達の対立) | Harume Kosaka | Genki Yoshimura | Kazuhisa Asai | Minako Itō | October 19, 1996 | 7.9 |
| 190 | 24 | "Truth Revealed! The Star Lights' Past"; Transliteration: "Akasareta shinjitsu! Seiya-tachi no kako" (Japanese: 明かされた真実!セイヤ達の過去) | Hiroki Shibata | Atsushi Maekawa | Kenichi Tajiri | Katsumi Tamegai | October 26, 1996 | 7.7 |
| 191 | 25 | "Butterflies of Light: A New Chapter on the Horizon"; Transliteration: "Hikari no chō ga mau toki! Atarashī nami no yokan" (Japanese: 光の蝶が舞う時!新しい波の予感) | Masahiro Hosoda | Ryōta Yamaguchi | Kazuyuki Hashimoto | Michiaki Sugimoto | November 9, 1996 | 9.0 |
| 192 | 26 | "Go for your Dream! Minako Becomes an Idol?!"; Transliteration: "Yume icchokusen! Aidoru Minako no tanjō!?" (Japanese: 夢一直線!アイドル美奈子の誕生!) | Yuji Endo | Kazuhiko Kanbe | Hidekazu Nakanishi | Shigetaka Kiyoyama | November 16, 1996 | 8.3 |
| 193 | 27 | "The Stolen Silver Crystal: Princess Kakyu Appears"; Transliteration: "Ubawareta ginzuishō! Kakyū Purinsesu shutsugen" (Japanese: うばわれた銀水晶!火球皇女出現) | Takuya Igarashi | Ryōta Yamaguchi | Kazuhisa Asai | Miho Shimogasa | November 30, 1996 | 7.5 |
| 194 | 28 | "Crusade for the Galaxy: Legend of the Sailor Wars"; Transliteration: "Ginga no seisen, Sērā Wōzu densetsu" (Japanese: 銀河の聖戦 セーラーウォーズ伝説) | Noriyo Sasaki | Ryōta Yamaguchi | Kazuhisa Asai | Yoshihiro Kitano | December 7, 1996 | 7.5 |
| 195 | 29 | "Princess Kakyu Perishes: Advent of Galaxia"; Transliteration: "Kakyū Purinsesu shōmetsu! Gyarakushia kōrin" (Japanese: 火球皇女消滅!ギャラクシア降臨) | Masahiro Hosoda | Kazuhiko Kanbe | Hidekazu Nakanishi | Michiaki Sugimoto | December 14, 1996 | 8.1 |
| 196 | 30 | "Countdown to Destruction: The Sailor Guardians' Last Battle"; Transliteration: "Ginga horobiru toki! Sērā Senshi saigo no tatakai" (Japanese: 銀河滅びる時!S戦士最後の戦い) | Harume Kosaka | Genki Yoshimura | Kazuhisa Asai | Minako Itō | January 11, 1997 | 7.7 |
| 197 | 31 | "Ruler of the Galaxy: The Menace of Galaxia"; Transliteration: "Ginga no shihaisha! Gyarakushia no kyōi" (Japanese: 銀河の支配者! ギャラクシアの脅威) | Hiroki Shibata | Ryōta Yamaguchi | Kazuyuki Hashimoto | Shigetaka Kiyoyama | January 18, 1997 | 7.5 |
| 198 | 32 | "Dying Stars: Uranus and Neptune's Last Stand"; Transliteration: "Kieyuku hoshiboshi! Uranusu-tachi no saigo" (Japanese: 消えゆく星々!ウラヌス達の最期) | Junichi Sato | Atsushi Maekawa | Yoshiyuki Shikano | Yoshihiro Kitano | January 25, 1997 | 8.4 |
| 199 | 33 | "The Light of Hope: The Final Battle for the Galaxy"; Transliteration: "Kibō no Hikari! Ginga wo kaketa saishū kessen" (Japanese: 希望の光!銀河をかけた最終決戦) | Masahiro Hosoda | Ryōta Yamaguchi | Kazuhisa Asai | Michiaki Sugimoto | February 1, 1997 | 8.1 |
| 200 | 34 | "Usagi's Love: The Moonlight Illuminates the Galaxy"; Transliteration: "Usagi no ai! Gekkō ginga wo terasu" (Japanese: うさぎの愛!月光銀河を照らす) | Takuya Igarashi | Ryōta Yamaguchi | Kazuyuki Hashimoto | Katsumi Tamegai | February 8, 1997 | 10.3 |

=== Specials ===
==== Short specials ====
Two short episodes were created to be shown with the first and third theatrical films of the Sailor Moon anime. The first, entitled "Make Up! Sailor Guardians", is a comical introduction to the cast of the series for those not familiar with the franchise, while the second, "Ami's First Love", is an adaptation of an extra story (omake) from the Sailor Moon manga.

In May 2014, Viz Media licensed the shorts for an English language release in North America.

| Title | Original airdate |
|---|---|
| "Make Up! Sailor Senshi" Transliteration: "Meikuappu! Sērā Senshi" (Japanese: メイクアップ！セーラー戦士) | December 5, 1993 with the Sailor Moon R film |
| "Ami's First Love" Transliteration: "Ami-chan no Hatsukoi" (Japanese: 亜美ちゃんの初恋) | December 23, 1995 with the SuperS film |

==== Sailor Moon SuperS special ====
The latter three specials, collectively called the "SuperS Specials", were released together, airing in lieu of a regular episode near the beginning of the SuperS season. The first special, "An Elegant Metamorphosis? Crybaby Usagi's Growth Diary", is a summary of the first three seasons of the Sailor Moon series. The second special, "Haruka and Michiru, Again! The Ghostly Puppet Show", features Haruka and Michiru in a luxury hotel on a cliff. In the third special, "Chibiusa's Adventure! The Dreaded Vampire Castle", Chibiusa uncovers one of her classmates as a monster and fights it with the other Sailor Guardians.

| Title | Original airdate |
|---|---|
| "An Elegant Metamorphosis? Crybaby Usagi's Growth Diary" Transliteration: "Karei ni Henshin? Nakimushi Usagi no Seichōkiroku" (Japanese: 華麗に変身？泣き虫うさぎの成長記録) | April 8, 1995 |
| "Haruka and Michiru, Again! The Ghostly Puppet Show" Transliteration: "Haruka Michiru futatabi! Bōrei ningyō geki" (Japanese: はるかみちる再び！亡霊人形劇) | April 8, 1995 |
| "Chibiusa's Adventure! The Dreaded Vampire Castle" Transliteration: "Chibiusa no bōken! Kyōfu, kyūketsuki no yakata" (Japanese: ちびうさの冒険！恐怖、吸血鬼の館) | April 8, 1995 |

== Films ==
| No. | Title | Original air date | English airdate |
|---|---|---|---|
| 1 | "Sailor Moon R: The Movie"; Transliteration: "Gekijō-ban Bishōjo Senshi Sērā Mūn R" (Japanese: 劇場版 美少女戦士セーラームーンR) | December 5, 1993 | February 8, 2000 |
| 2 | "Sailor Moon S: The Movie"; Transliteration: "Gekijō-ban Bishōjo Senshi Sērā Mūn Sūpā" (Japanese: 劇場版 美少女戦士セーラームーンS) | December 4, 1994 | May 23, 2000 |
| 3 | "Sailor Moon SuperS: The Movie"; Transliteration: "Bishōjo Senshi Sērā Mūn Sūpāzu: Sērā Kyū Senshi Shūketsu! Burakku Dorīmu Hōru no Kiseki" (Japanese: 美少女戦士セーラームーンSuperS(スーパーズ) セーラー9戦士集結！ブラック・ドリーム・ホールの奇跡) | December 23, 1995 | May 23, 2000 |
