= The Talk =

The Talk may refer to:

- The Talk (talk show), an American daytime talk show on CBS that debuted from 2010 to 2024
- "The Talk" (Mortified), an episode of Mortified
- The talk (racism in the United States), a conversation black American parents have with their children about the dangers they could face due to racism
- The talk (sex education), the discussion by parents, with their children, about sexual relationships, functions, and results

== See also ==
- Talk (disambiguation)
- Talk show (disambiguation)
- The Talk Show (disambiguation)
