= The Talk Show =

The Talk Show may refer to:

- Talk show, a television programming or radio programming genre
- Talk radio, a radio format
- The Talk (talk show), an American talk show on CBS
- The Barry Gibb Talk Show, a recurring sketch on Saturday Night Live
- The Talk Show (podcast), with John Gruber

== See also ==
- Talk show (disambiguation)
- The Talk (disambiguation)
- The Show (disambiguation)
- List of talk show hosts
