= Late Shift =

Late Shift or The Late Shift may refer to:

- Late Shift (film), a 2025 Switzerland, Germany co-production drama film
- Late Shift (video game), a full-motion video game released in 2017
- The Late Shift (book), 1994 book about Johnny Carson's retirement from The Tonight Show, and conflict about successors
- The Late Shift (film), a 1996 HBO film based on the book
- Comedy Inc: The Late Shift, a 2005–2007 series of Australian sketch show Comedy Inc.

== See also ==
- Shift work
