= Show of hands =

Show of hands may refer to:

- Show of hands (politics), a voting method in deliberative assemblies

== Music ==
- Show of Hands, a British folk music duo
- Show of Hands (1987 album) or the title song, by Show of Hands
- Show of Hands Live, a 1992 album by Show of Hands
- A Show of Hands, a 1989 album by Rush
- A Show of Hands (Victor Wooten album) or the title song, 1996
- "Show of Hands", a 2017 song by Kaskade from Redux EP 002
- "Show of Hands", a 2024 song by Future, Metro Boomin and ASAP Rocky from We Still Don't Trust You

== Film and television ==
- Show of Hands (film), a 2008 New Zealand film
- A Show of Hands (video), a 1989 concert film by Rush
- A Show of Hands (TV series), a 1992 series of short films aired on Nickelodeon
