= Talking Head =

A talking head is a television pundit.

Talking head or talking heads may also refer to:

== Music ==
- Talking Heads, an American rock band
  - Talking Heads (album), a 2005 box set by Talking Heads
- "Talking Head", a song by Motörhead from the 1979 album Bomber
- "Talking Heads", a 2019 single by Black Midi
- "Talking Heads", a song by Northlane from the 2019 album Alien

== Television, theatre and film ==
- Talking Head (film), a 1992 film by Mamoru Oshii
- Talking Heads (British TV series), a BBC television series by Alan Bennett
  - Talking Heads (play), a 2003 stage adaptation of the BBC series
- Talking Heads (Australian TV series), a television series hosted by Peter Thompson
- Talking Heads, a 1980 short film by Krzysztof Kieślowski

=== Episodes ===
- "Talking Heads" (Body of Proof), an episode of the TV series Body of Proof
- "Talking Head", an episode of the TV series KYTV
