= Festivals in Tokyo =

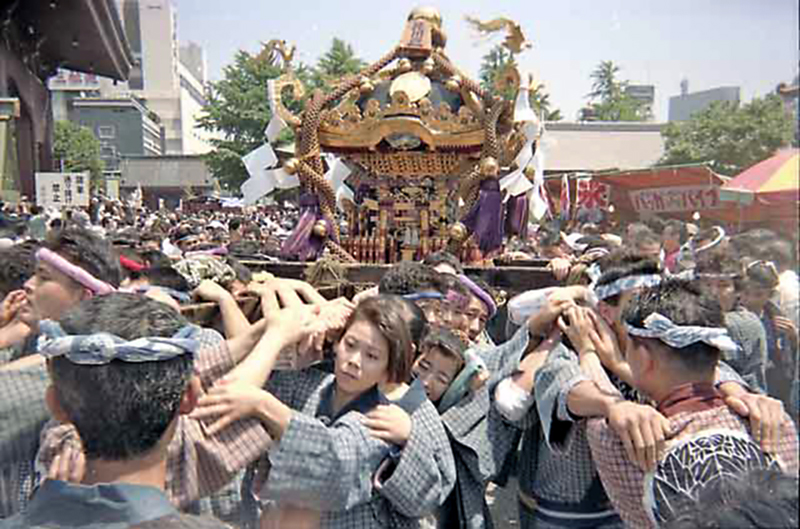
Sanja Matsuri in Asakusa.

Tokyo holds many festivals (matsuri) throughout the year. Major Shinto shrine festivals include the Sanno Festival at Hie Shrine, and the Sanja Festival at Asakusa Shrine. The Kanda Matsuri in Tokyo is held every two years in May. The festival features a parade with elaborately decorated floats and thousands of people.

More secular and seasonal festivals include cherry blossom, or sakura, viewing parties in the spring where thousands gather in parks such as Ueno Park, Inokashira Park, and the Shinjuku Gyoen National Garden for picnics under the cherry trees. In the summer annual firework and dance festivals such as the Sumida River fireworks festival on the last Saturday of July, and the Kōenji Awa Odori dance festival on the last weekend in August attract millions of viewers.

| Festival name | Location | Description | Time |
|---|---|---|---|
| Hachiōji Matsuri | Hachiōji | Features many Matsuri Floats | Early August |
| Torigoe Matsuri | Asakusa (Torikoe Shrine) | It features the largest mikoshi of Tokyo. | June |
| Bunkyo Tsutsuji Matsuri | Bunkyō (Nezu Shrine) | Azalea festival | April to May |
| Fuji Matsuri | Kōtō (Kameido Tenjin Shrine) | Wisteria festival | April to May |
| Hinode Matsuri | Ōme (Mitake Shrine) | Sunrise festival | May 8 |
| Kachiya Festival | Kōtō (Katori Shrine) | This festival commemorates Fujiwara Hidesato's prayer for victory before suppressing Taira no Masakado's revolt. The festival dates to Hidesato's offering of his bow and arrow to the shrine after his victory in battle. During the modern festival, there is a dedication of a kachiya (victory arrow) and a traditional warrior parade. | May 5 |
| Kanda Matsuri | Chiyoda (Kanda Myojin Shrine) | Kanda Matsuri is one of Tokyo's three major festivals that dates back to the Edo period. The festival's climax occurs when volunteer Kandakko carry 200 portable shrines in a vigorous parade toward the Kanda Myojin Shrine. | May (Saturday and Sunday closest to the 15th) |
| Tenno Matsuri | Shinagawa (Shinagawa Shrine and Ebara Jinja Shrine) | Includes Kappa Matsuri ritual. | Early June |
| Kifune Matsuri | Ōta (Kifune Shrine) | | Spring (between March and May) |
| Kurayami Matsuri | Fuchu (Okunitama Shrine) | Black night festival | Spring (between end of April and first week in May) |
| Meiji Shrine Spring Festival | Shibuya (Meiji Shrine) | | Spring (between March and May) |
| Osunafumi Taisai | Setagaya (Tamagawa Daishi Temple) | Walking-on-sand ritual | Spring (between March and May) |
| Sanja Matsuri | Taitō (Asakusa Shrine) | A festival honoring the three men that found a statue of Kannon which led to the founding of Sensō-ji in the Asakusa district. Its notable for its extravagant parade of mikoshi, musicians and dancers. | Third weekend in May |
| Shishi Matsuri | Toshima (Nagasaki Shrine) | Lion dance festival | Spring (between March and May) |
| Takigi Noh | Minato (Zōjō-ji) | Open-air torchlight Noh performance | Spring (between March and May) |
| Yayoi Matsuri | Taitō (near Sensō-ji) | ceremony by the Edo Shobo Kinen-kai (Edo Civilian Fire Fighters' Association) | Spring (between March and May) |
| Sanno Matsuri | Chiyoda (Hie Shrine) | | June |
| Asakusa Samba Matsuri | | | Summer (between June and August) |
| Sumidagawa Fireworks Festival | Sumida River | | Summer (last Saturday in July) |
| Tokyo Bay Fireworks | Tokyo Bay | | Summer (August) |
| Jingu Fireworks | | | Summer (August) |
| Fukagawa Matsuri | Kōtō (Tomioka Hachiman Shrine) | It is one of the three major Shinto festivals in Tokyo. | Summer (between June and August) |
| Kōenji Awa Odori | Kōenji Suginami | Largest Awa Dance Festival outside Tokushima Prefecture, with an average of 188 groups composed of 12,000 dancers. | Summer (last weekend of August) |
| Harajuku Omotesandō Genki Matsuri Super Yosakoi | Harajuku, Omotesandō, Yoyogi Park, Meiji Shrine | Yosakoi dance festival, with an average of 100 groups. | Summer (last weekend of August) |
| Reisai Matsuri | Bunkyō (Nezu Shrine) | | September 21 |
| Tokyo Jidai Matsuri | Asakusa | This festival celebrates the history of Tokyo and was first held in 1999. (It is not to be confused with Kyoto's Jidai Matsuri.) | November 3 |
| Oeshiki | Ikegami Honmonji | | October 11–13 |
| Hatsumōde | Meiji Shrine, Sensoji, and other major shrines and temples | New Year's Prayers | Winter (between December and February) |
| Dezome-shiki | Tokyo Big Sight | Fireman's Parade | Winter (between December and February) |
| Setsubun | Sensō-ji and other major temples | | Winter (between December and February) |

== See also ==
- Festivals in Nagoya
- Culture of Tokyo
