= Kanda Matsuri =

Shinto festival in Tokyo, Japan

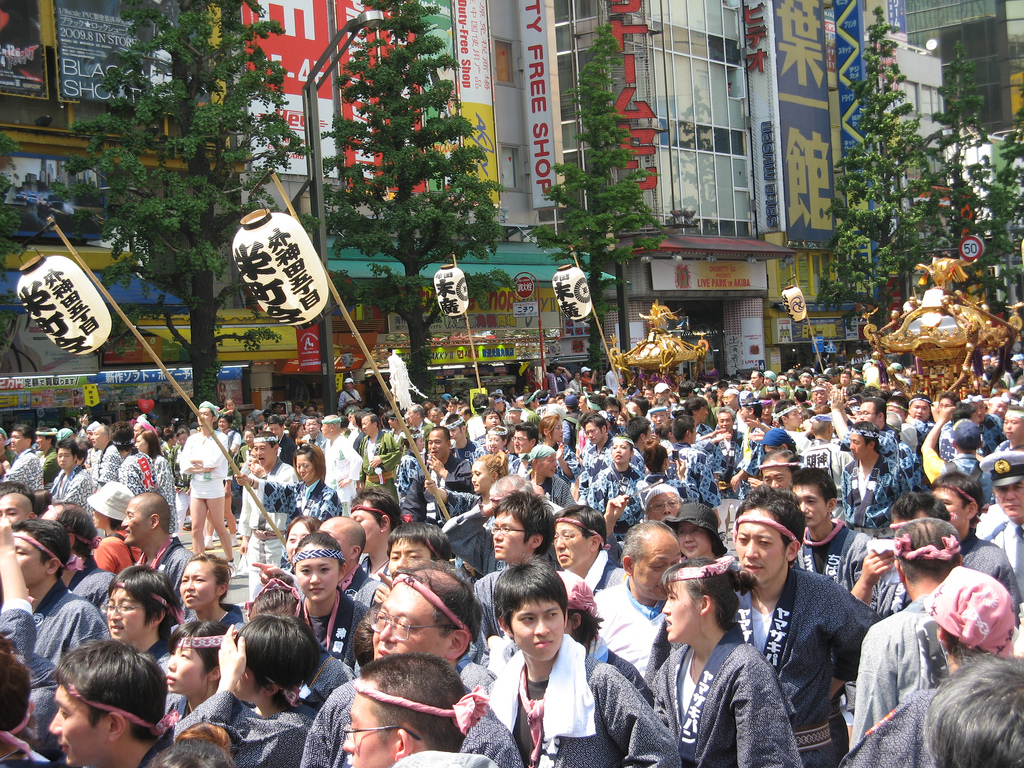
- Kanda Matsuri, 2009.
- Observed by: Tokyo
- Type: Religious
- Date: Saturday or Sunday nearest 15 May
- Related to: Fukagawa Matsuri, Sannō Matsuri

Kanda Matsuri (神田祭) or the Kanda Festival, is one of the three great Shinto festivals of Tokyo, along with the Fukagawa Matsuri and Sannō Matsuri. The festival started in the early 17th century as a celebration of Tokugawa Ieyasu's decisive victory at the battle of Sekigahara and was continued as a display of the prosperity of the Tokugawa shogunate during the Edo period. Additionally, the current form of the festival is also held in honor of the kami of Kanda Myōjin (Kanda Shrine).

The festival is held on the Saturday and Sunday preceding May 15, but since it alternates with the Sannō Matsuri, it is only held in odd-numbered years. On these years, the festival takes place at Kanda Shrine as well as in surrounding central Tokyo districts. Its prominent parades involve over 200 mikoshi, in addition to musicians, dancers, and floats.

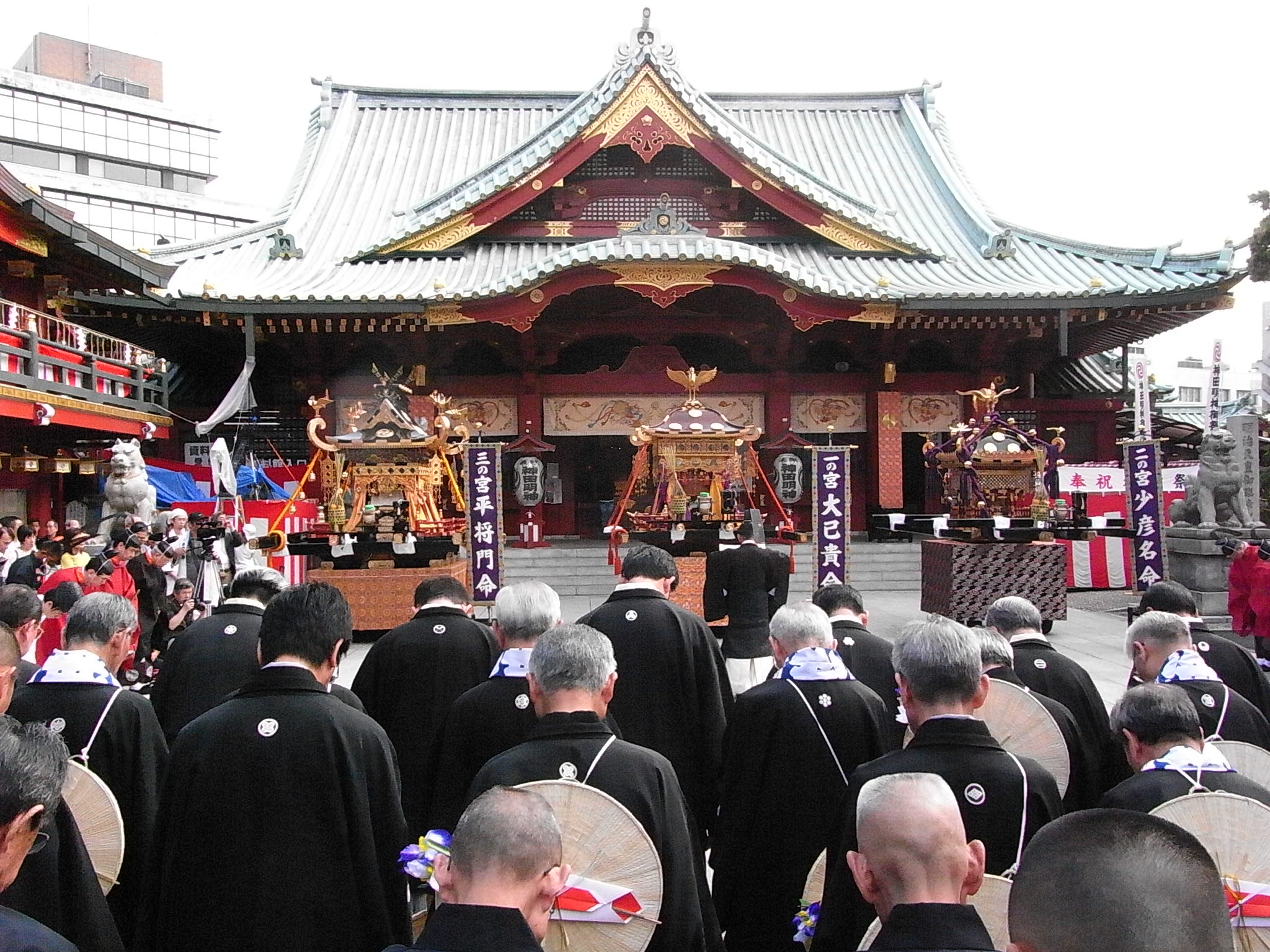
Kanda Matsuri, 2009

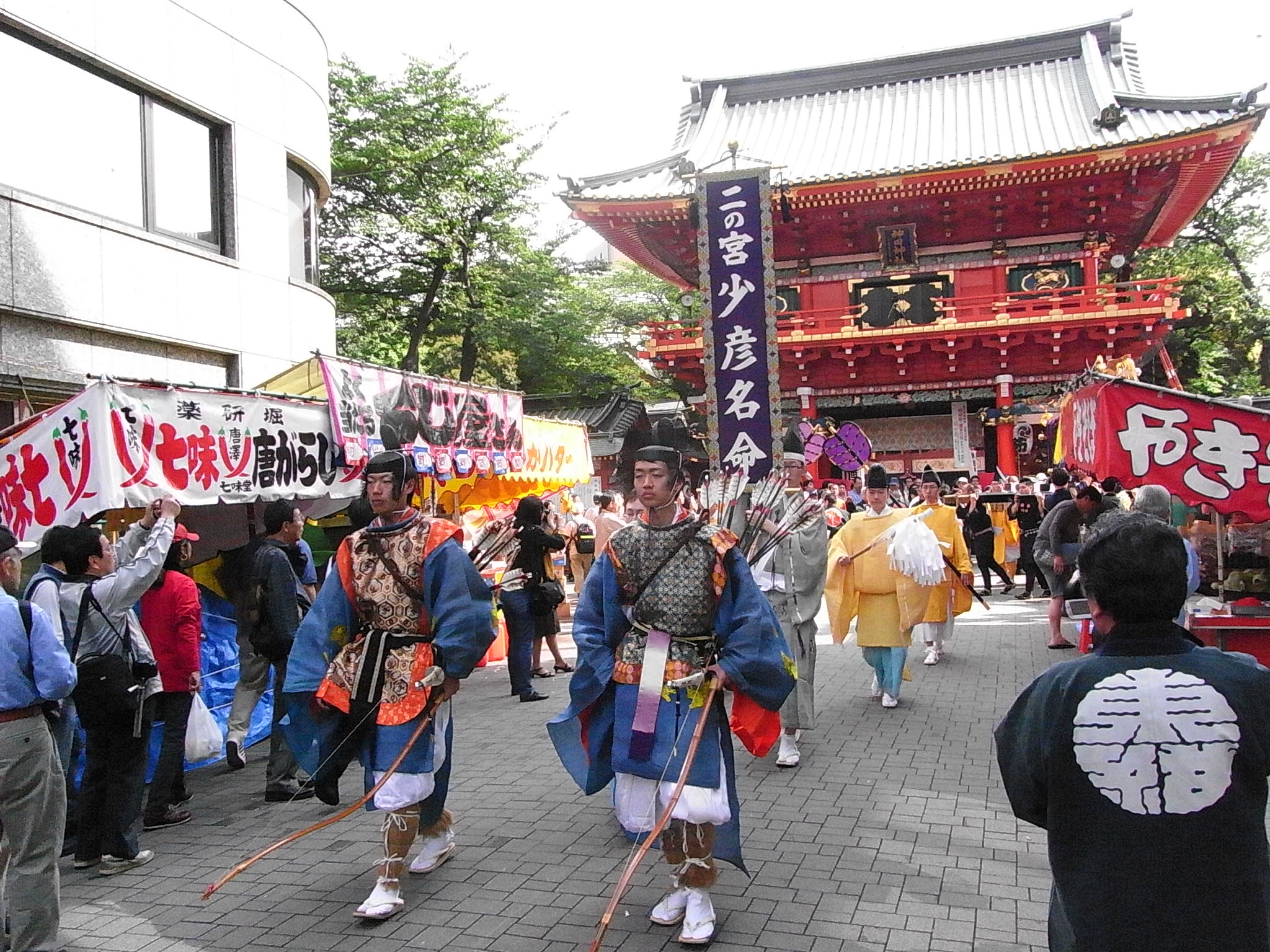
Kanda Matsuri, 2009

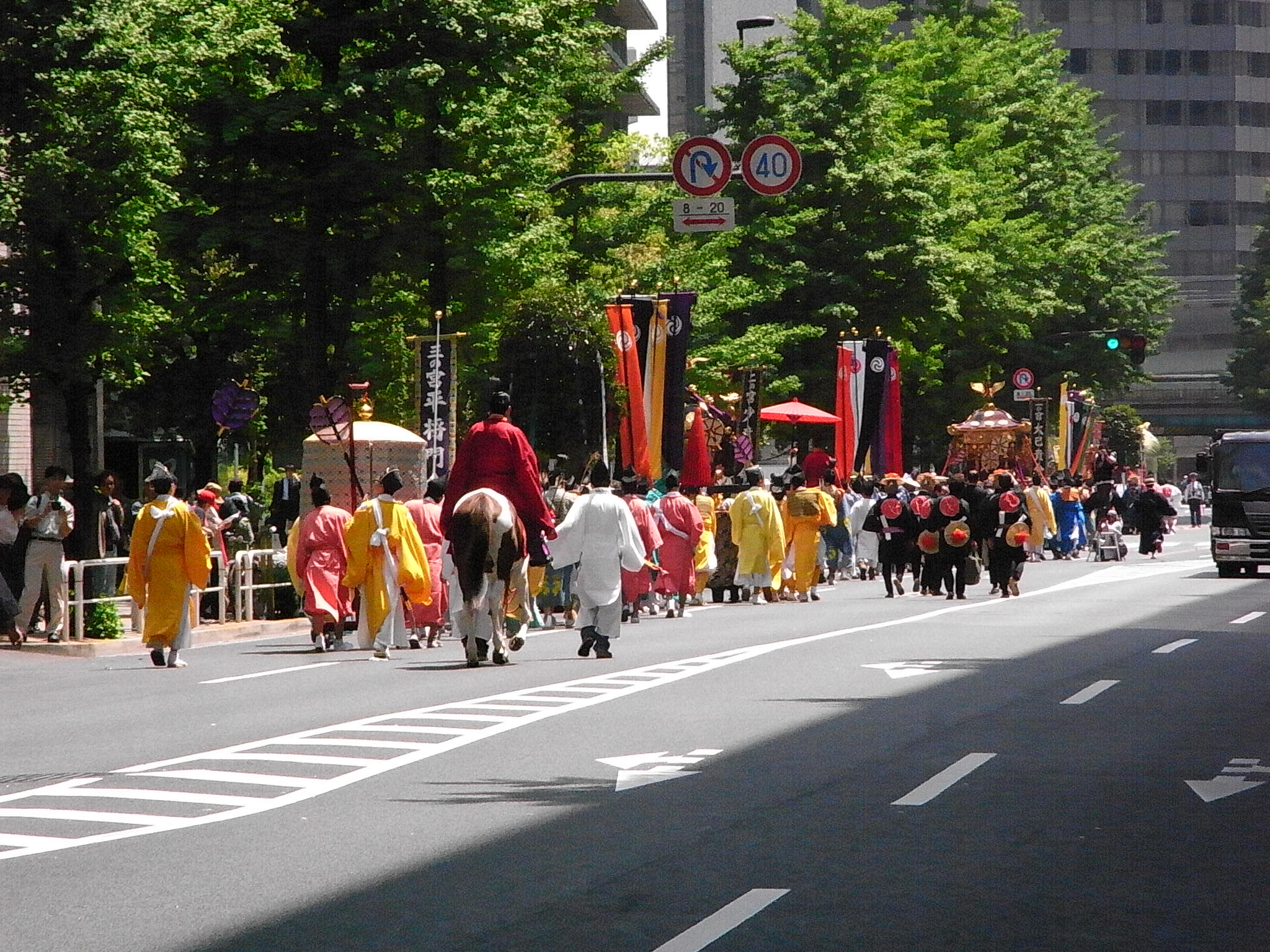
Kanda Matsuri, 2009

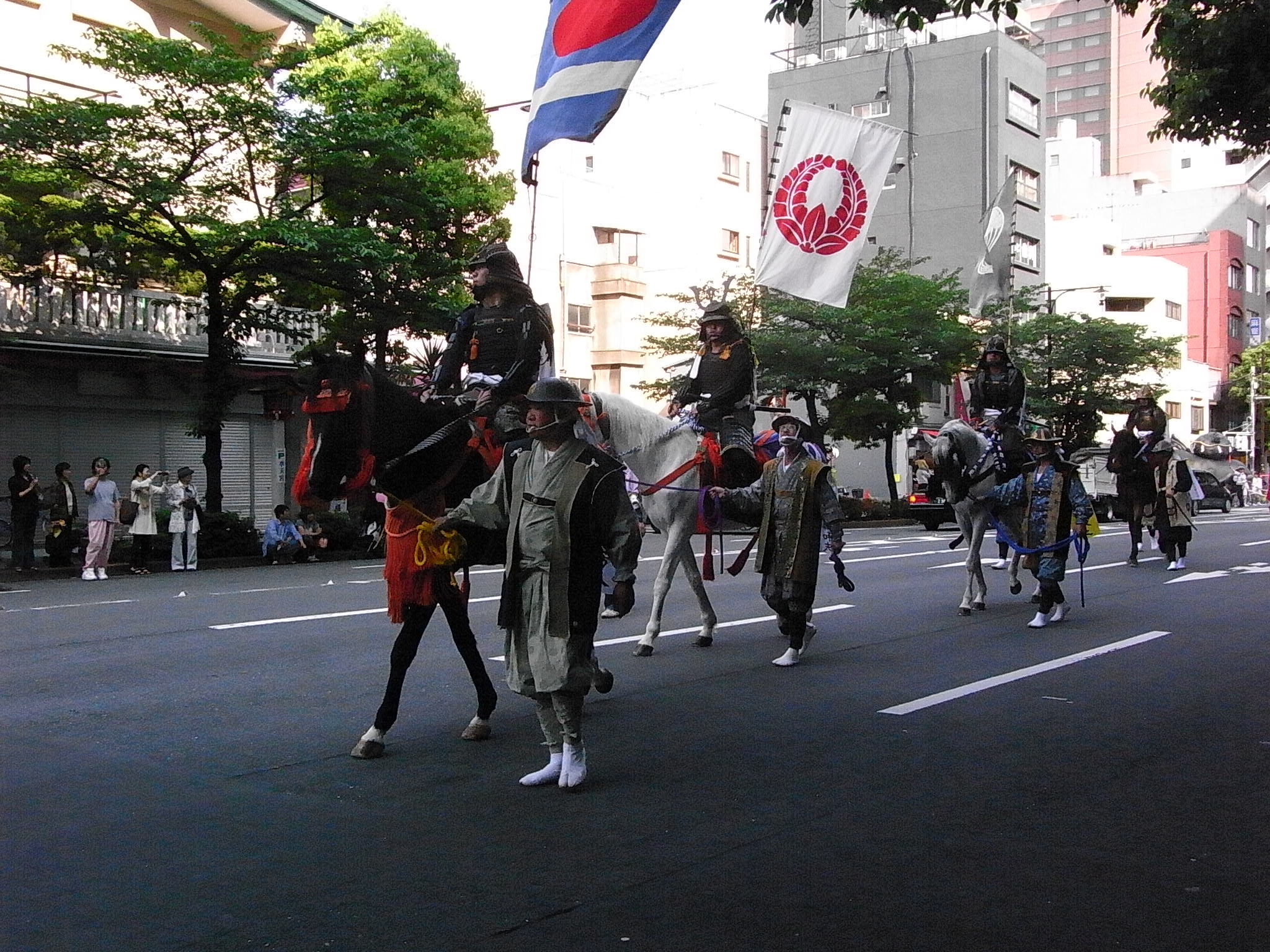
Kanda Matsuri, 2009

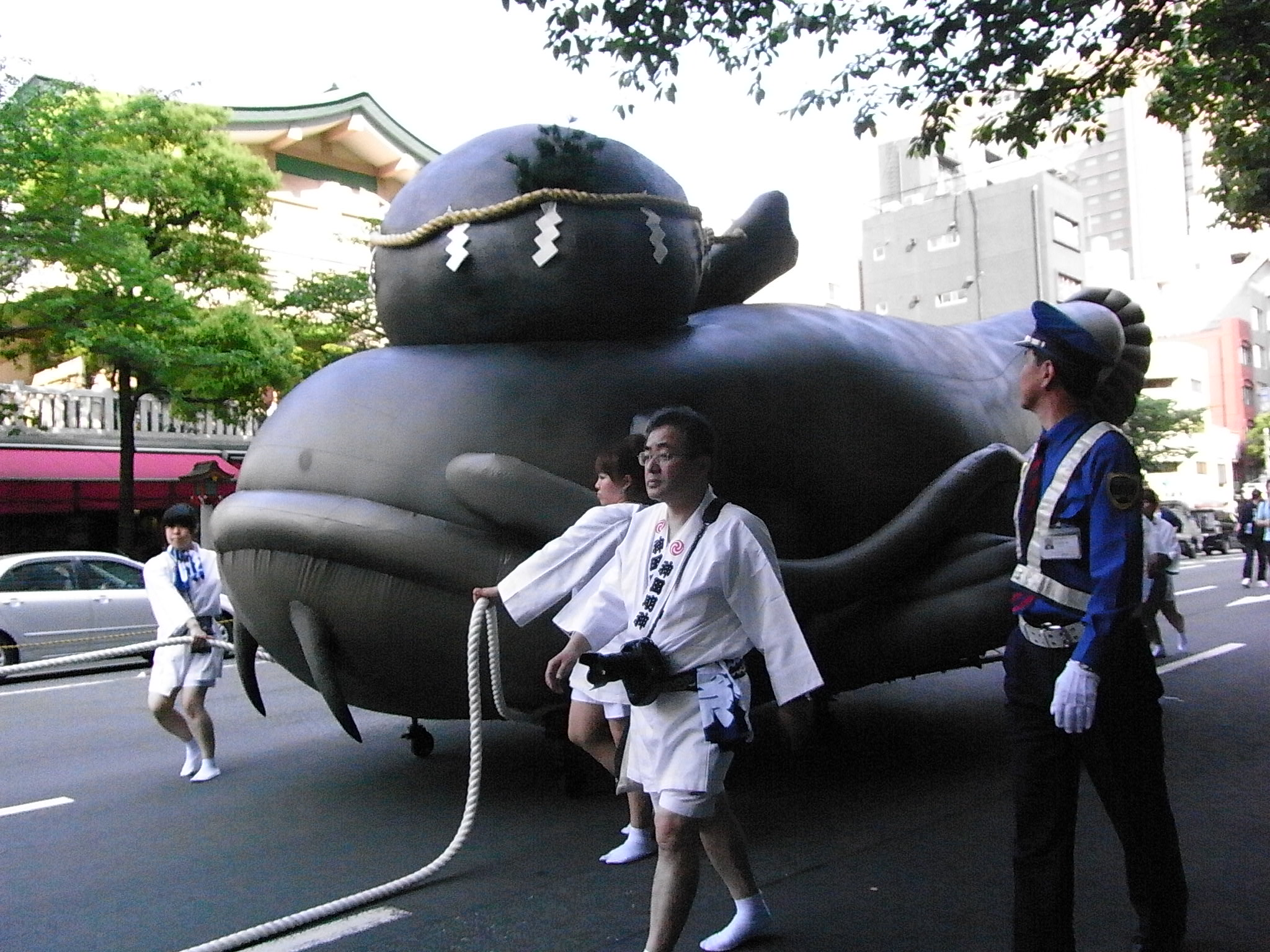
Kanda Matsuri, 2009

== See also ==
- Culture of Japan
- Japanese calendar
- Japanese festivals
- Festivals in Tokyo
