= Akita Kantō =

Japanese festival

Coordinates: 39°43′6.5″N 140°6′47.5″E

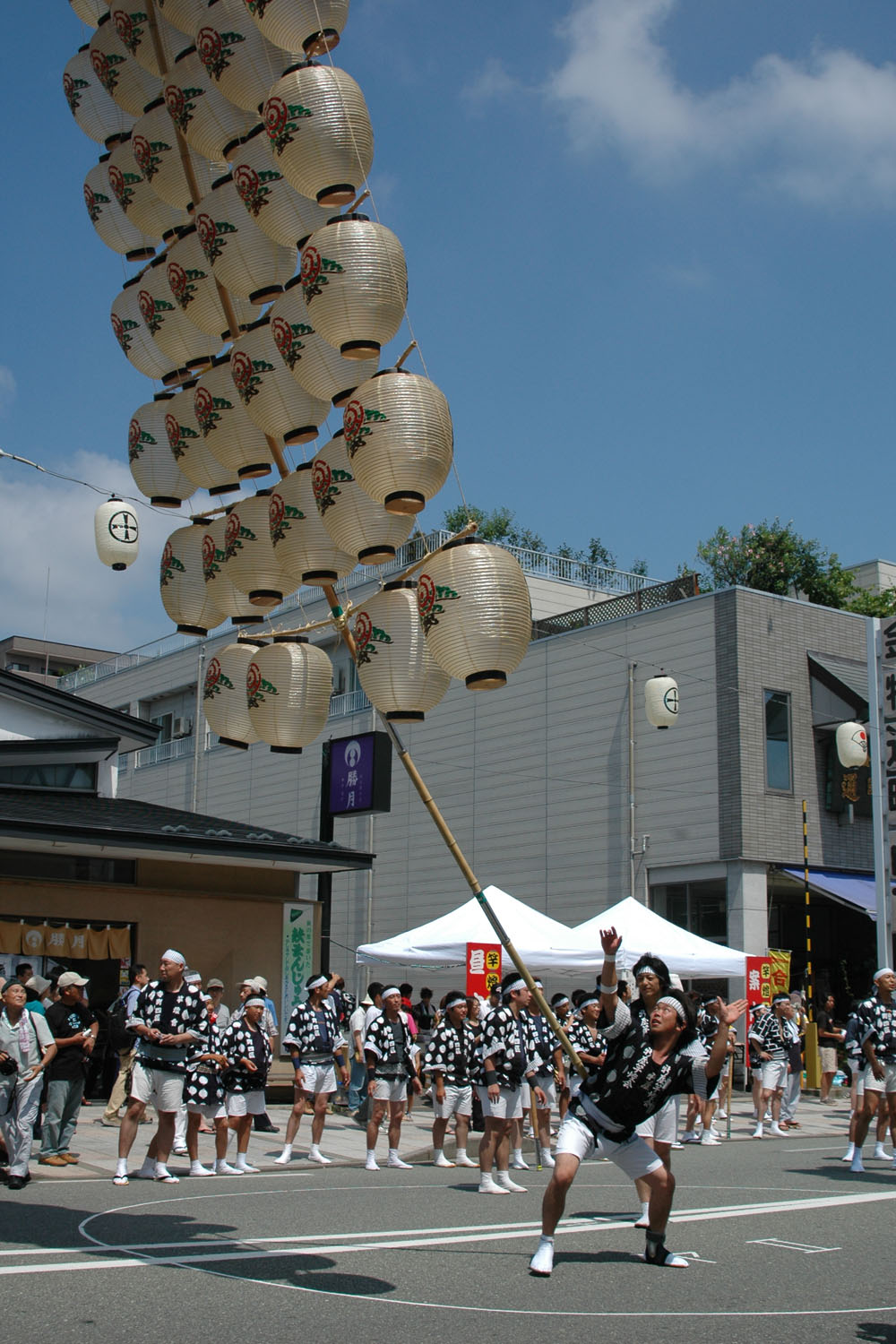
- Celebrant of the Akita Kantō
- Observed by: Akita City
- Type: Religious
- Begins: 3 August
- Ends: 7 August
- Date: 3 August
- Next time: 3 August 2027
- Duration: 5 days
- Frequency: annual
- Related to: Fukagawa Matsuri, Sannō Matsuri

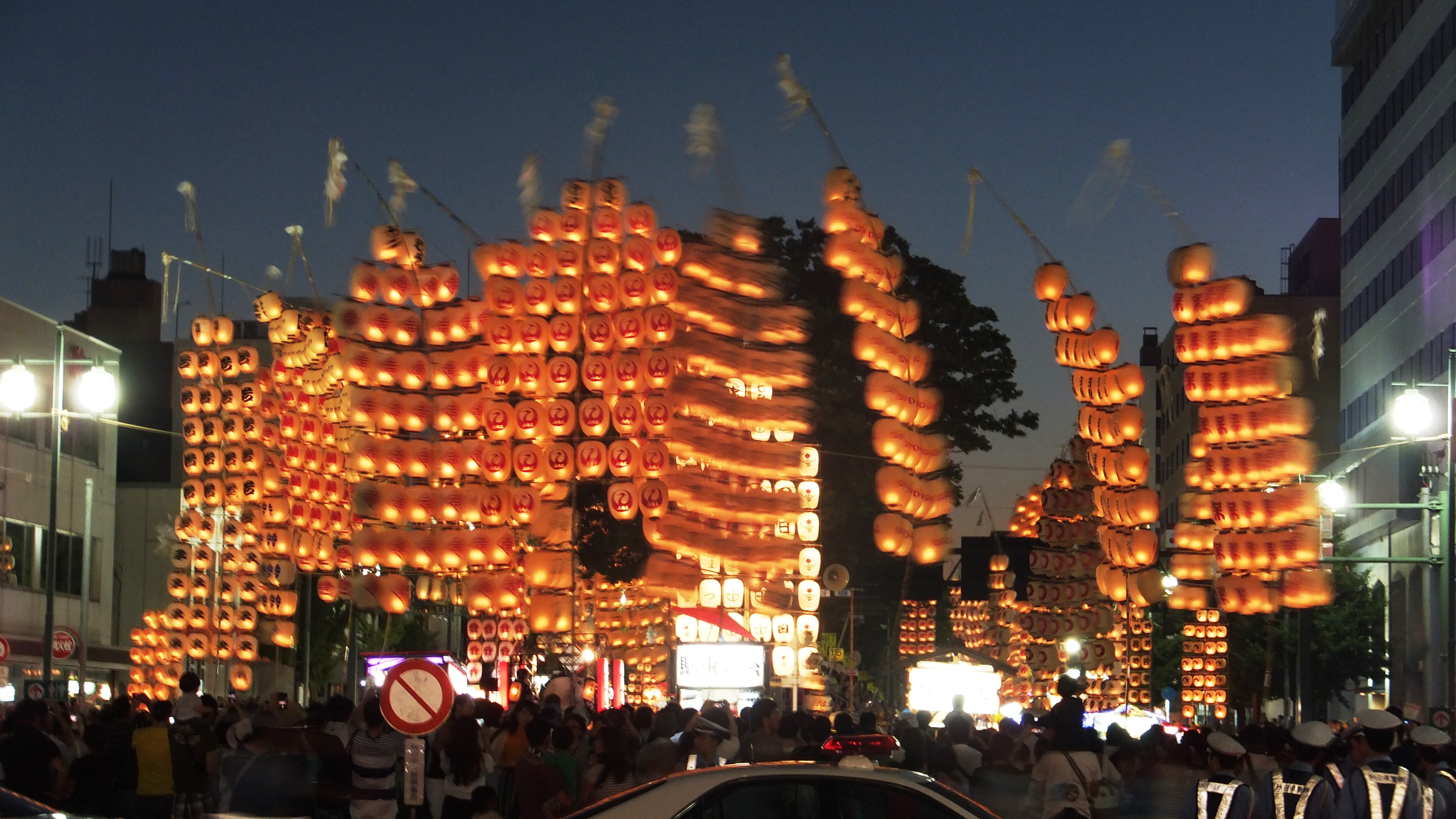
Kanto Festival at night (August 2017)

The Akita Kantō (秋田竿燈まつり) is a Japanese festival celebrated from 3–6 August in Akita City, Akita Prefecture in hope for a good harvest. Around 280 bamboo poles five to twelve metres long, bearing twenty-four or forty-six lanterns, topped with gohei, and weighing up to fifty kilograms, are carried through the streets by night on the palms, foreheads, shoulders, or lower backs of the celebrants. The festival is first referred to in a travel diary of 1789 The Road Where the Snow Falls (雪の降る道). It is one of the main festivals in Tōhoku, along with the Tanabata festival in Sendai, the Aomori Nebuta Matsuri festival, and the Yamagata Hanagasa Festival in Yamagata. The Akita Kantō festival was designated an Important Intangible Folk Cultural Property on 28 January 1980.

== History ==
This festival originated from Neburi Nagashi which was held for ridding illness and maliciousness in summer. It already existed in the Horeki Period (1751–1764), in the middle of Edo era. "Yuki no huru michi (The road where it snows)" written by Soan Tsumura in 1789 is regarded as the oldest document which described Neburi Nagashi. It describes that Neburi Nagashi was held on 6 July of the lunar calendar and introduced as the original tradition of Akita. Also, Neburi Nagashi was an annual event to pray for good harvests and artistic progress.

In the Neburi Nagashi around Akita city, people decorated silk trees and bamboo grasses with strips of paper on which they had written their wishes. Then, they walked around the city with them and floated them downstream. In Neburi Nagashi, people combined candles and lanterns. This instrument for Neburi Nagashi became called Kanto.

The present official name of the event was first used by Tetsusaku Okubo in 1881, when he suggested the idea of entertaining the Meiji Emperor with the Kanto performance to those who were in charge of hosting the Emperor during his visit to Akita.

Since the lunar calendar changed to the solar calendar in 1872, the Kanto festival was compelled to be held one month earlier. However, the number of Kanto, which had been 50 in 1900, had dramatically decreased due to changes of festival’s schedule and its site. The numbers of Kanto which participated in the Kanto festival in 1905 were only 4 or 5 and this situation made the future of the festival uncertain. Emperor Taisho visited Akita and appreciated Kanto performance in 1908. Also a soft drink factory started to advertise its beverages on Kanto’s lanterns in 1909. These two events helped the restoration of Kanto festival. Then, the festival’s schedule changed to the lunar calendar again to avoid the rainy season and the number of visitors increased. In 1931, the Kanto Society, which managed the Kanto Skill Festival (Myogikai), was founded. Although Kanto festival was canceled between 1938 and 1946 due to the Second World War, it resumed after the war. The Kanto Festival Executive Committee was established in 1966. While the Kanto Society had been managing the Kanto Skill Festival, the Kanto Festival Executive Committee was in charge of the operation of the Kanto Festival. Triggered by the First Kanto Performance overseas in San Diego, US, in 1976, the Kanto began to be performed in various countries.

The date of the festival had changed three times. At present, the Kanto festival is held from 3 to 6 August every year.

== Features ==
Kantō literally means "a pole with lanterns" and is made from bamboo poles and rice paper lanterns, which hang from horizontal bars. When Kantō was invented, the lantern was hung in the garden. To convert it into a portable lantern, the dwarf bamboo that had been used for the lantern legs was replaced by longer bamboo. The main bamboo pole of Kantō is called "Oyatake". All bamboo used for the main poles of Kantō are produced in Japan and are quite thick. Also, the regulations on thickness and the space between joints of the root are very strict. Thus people who pick bamboos must select suitable bamboos to produce Kantō. The combined bamboos with main bamboo are called "Yokotake". A number of lanterns are suspended from each Yokotake. The bamboo added to lengthen Oyatake to extend the height of Kanto during a performance is called "Tsugidake".

Kantō is classified into four categories; Oowaka, Chuwaka, Kowaka and Youwaka. The size, height and weight are regulated. (Table1)

Table1 Categories of Kanto and sizes
| | Length (m) | Weight (kg) | Size of lantern (cm) | The number of lanterns |
|---|---|---|---|---|
| Oowaka | 12 | 50 | 64*45 | 46 |
| Chuwaka | 9 | 30 | 48*36 | 46 |
| Kowaka | 7 | 15 | 48*36 | 24 |
| Youwaka | 5 | 5 | 30*21 | 24 |

== Skills and contests ==
The techniques of Kanto are collectively called "Myogi". There are 5 categories of Myogi; Nagashi, Hirate (hand), Koshi (hip), Kata (shoulder) and Hitai (forehead). Performing groups, each consisting of 5 members, show these 5 techniques, one at time.

- Nagashi

Performers support Kanto for other performers to add Tsugitake. They keep it on their palms and balance with their fingers.

- Hirate (hand)

Performers hold Kanto up higher. Then they add Tsugitake and keep it on their palms.

- Koshi (hip)

Performers hold Kanto with their fingers. Then they move it on their palms onto their hip. They bend the upper part of the body toward the side and balance with their legs.

- Kata (shoulder)

Performers keep Kanto on their palms of the dominant hand and make a straight line from the pivot leg to Kanto. Then they lift it higher.

- Hitai (forehead)

Performers hold Kanto with their fingers. Then they move it to their palms and put it on their foreheads. They keep this posture with their arms spread.

The contest to compete with techniques of Kanto is called Myogikai or the daytime Kanto. The aim of Myogikai is "improving the skill of the Kanto as a whole by showing the Society members' skills to public and studying each other's skill." Following this aim, performers maintain the unification and systemization of Kanto festival by upgrading their skills. Myogikai consists of team and individual competitions and performers who clear the preliminary can reach the final. Although both of them are judged in different ways, they compete in accuracy of skills, beauty of the posture and stability of Kanto. Since 1989, the skills competition has been complemented by musical performance. The rules for performance are strict. Time constraints are imposed for each skill and performers must perform in a circle which has a diameter of 6 meters. After all competitions, the winner in each competition is awarded a prize by Kanto Executive Committee.

The night performance is a main event of Kanto festival. It is held in Kanto Oodori (one of the main streets in Akita city). During the night performance, performers don't compete against each other in skills and entertain visitors by showing their skills and illuminated Kanto. More than 230 Kanto are raised at the same time of the sound of flutes.

== See also ==
- Matsuri
- Important Intangible Cultural Properties of Japan
- List of Important Intangible Folk Cultural Properties
