= Jidai Matsuri =

Traditional Japanese festival in Kyoto

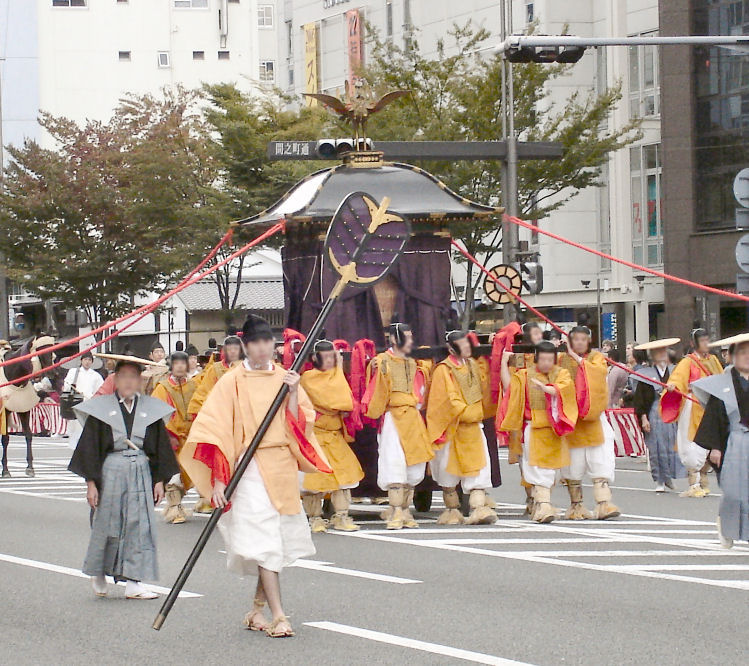
- Also called: Jidai
- Observed by: Kyoto, Japan
- Type: Religious
- Date: 22 October
- Next time: 22 October 2026
- First time: 1895 - (131 years, 5 months and 23 days)
- Related to: Fukagawa Matsuri, Sannō Matsuri

The Jidai Matsuri (時代祭; "Festival of the Ages") is a traditional Japanese festival (also called matsuri) held annually on October 22 in Kyoto, Japan. It is one of Kyoto's three major festivals, with the other two being the Aoi Matsuri, held annually on May 15, and the Gion Matsuri, which is held annually from 17 to July 24. It is a festival enjoyed by people of all ages, participating in its historical reenactment parade dressed in authentic costumes representing various periods, and characters in Japanese feudal history.

The Jidai Matsuri traces its roots to the relocation of the Japanese capital from Kyoto to Tokyo during the Meiji Restoration in 1868. This involved the relocation of the Emperor of Japan and the Imperial family, the Imperial Palace, and thousands of government officials and subjects to the new city. Fearing for Kyoto's loss of glory and interest from her people, and to commemorate its history, the city government and the Kyoto prefectural government commemorated the 1100th anniversary of the founding of Heian-kyō (平安京), which was the former name of Kyoto, in 794 by Emperor Kanmu (桓武天皇, Kanmu-tennō) (737–806). To inaugurate the first Jidai celebration in 1895, the city government built the Heian Shrine (平安神宮, Heian jingū) to enshrine the spirit of Emperor Kanmu. To add meaning to the festival, it staged a costume procession representing people of each era in Kyoto history. In 1940, the local government decided that on top of honouring Emperor Kanmu, the Jidai festival was also to be held in honour of Emperor Kōmei (孝明天皇, Kōmei-tennō) (July 22, 1831 – January 30, 1867) for his work in unifying the country, the power of the imperial court and the affirmation of Kyoto as the center of Japan at the decline of the Tokugawa shogunate and the end of the Edo period.

The Jidai Matsuri begins in early morning with the mikoshi (portable shrines) brought out of the Kyoto Imperial Palace so that people may pay their respects. The mikoshi represents both Emperor Kanmu and Emperor Kōmei. The five-hour, two-kilometer costume procession begins in the afternoon, with approximately 2,000 performers dressed as samurai, military figures, and common people, from the earliest eras to the Meiji era. These are followed by Japanese women who are dressed in elaborate jūnihitoe (十二単衣, juunihitoe). Finally, the mikoshi are carried from the palace and are accompanied by a costumed military band that plays the gagaku. The procession ends at the Heian Shrine.

The Jidai Matsuri in 2019 was rescheduled to 26 October due to the Enthronement ceremony of Emperor Naruhito.

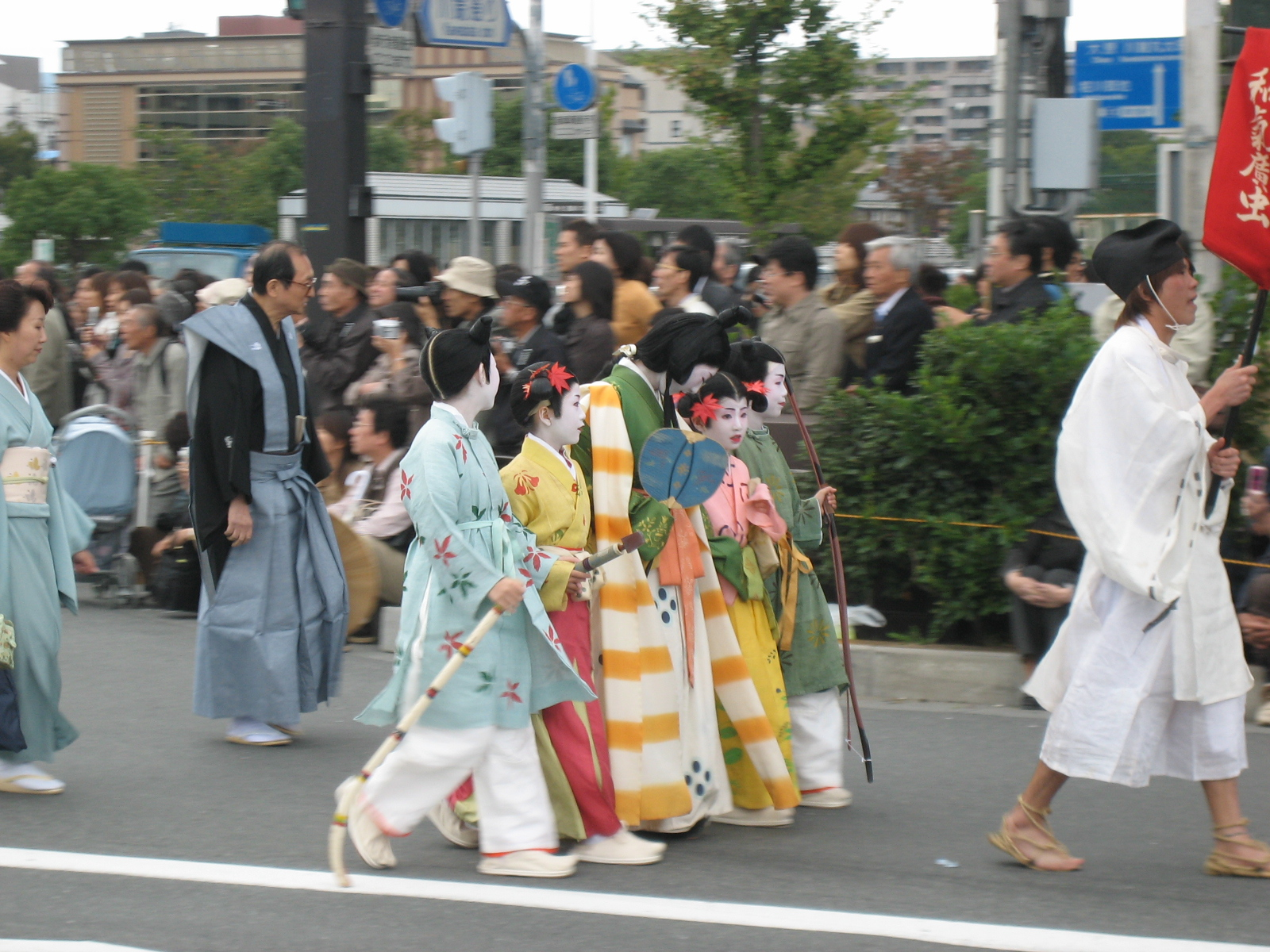

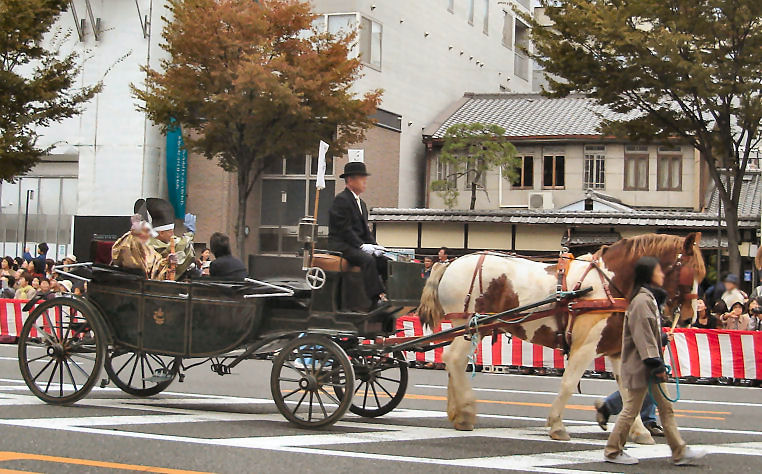

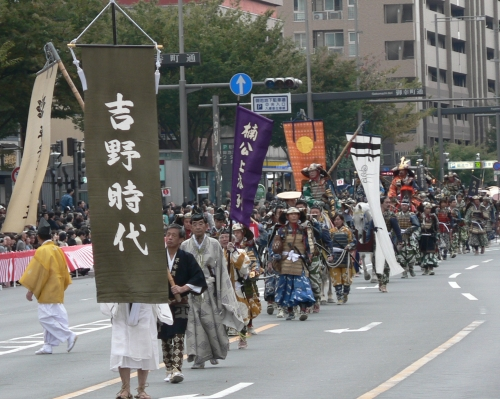
