= Tenno Matsuri =

Annual festival in Tsushima, Aichi, Japan

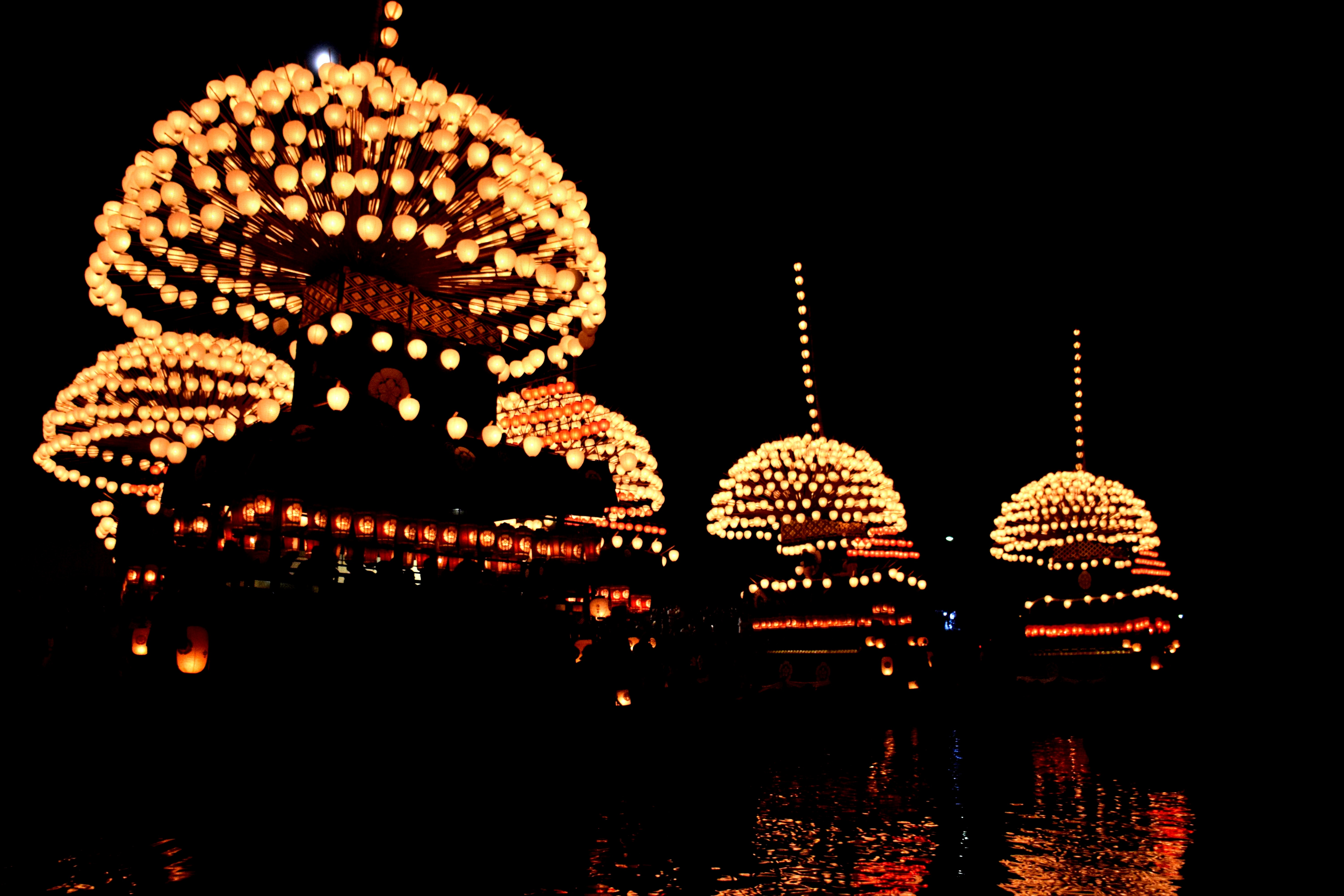
Owari Tsushima Tennōsai(eve)

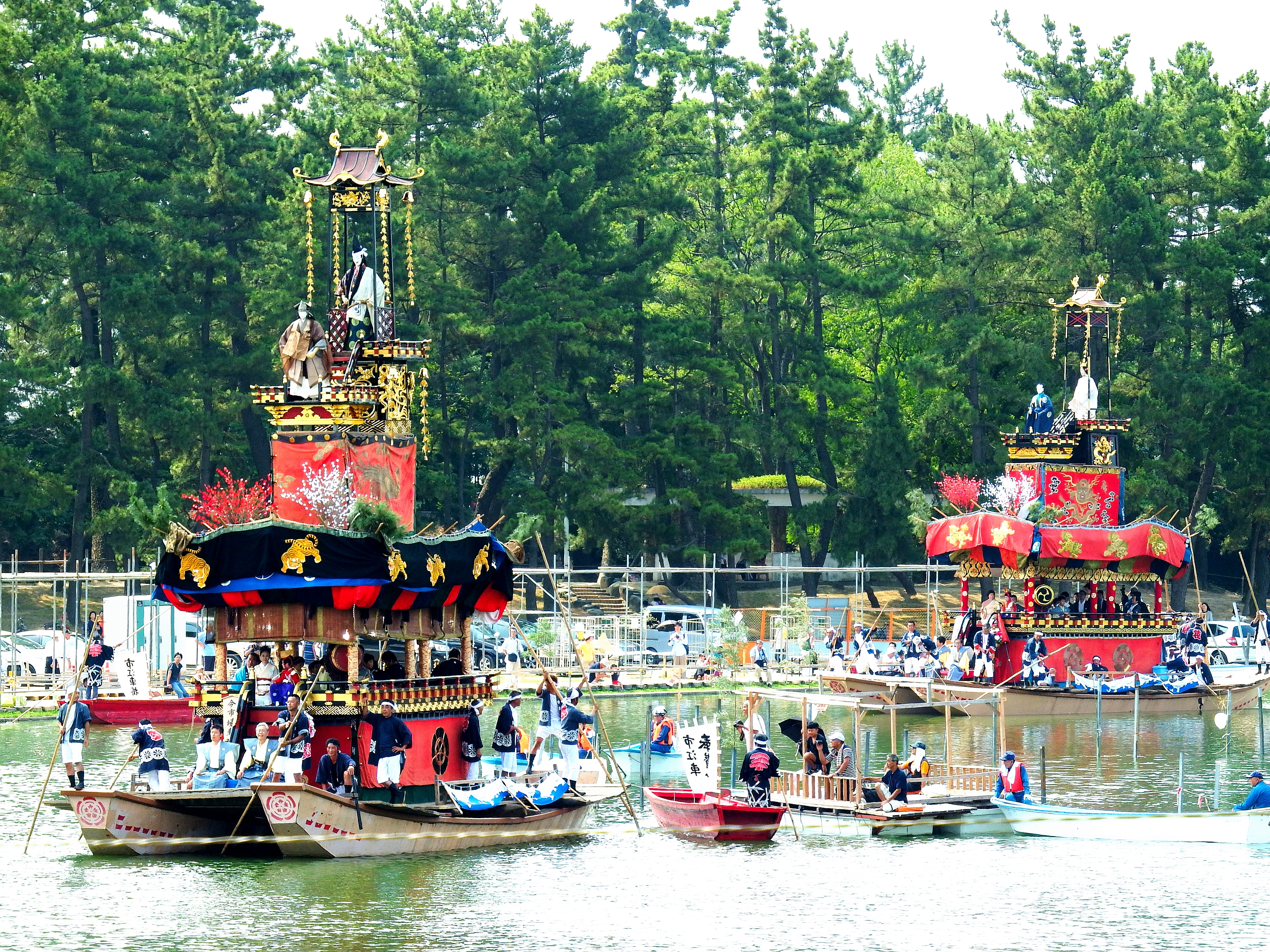
Owari Tsushima Tennōsai

Tenno Matsuri (天王祭り) is a festival held annually, in July, in Tsushima, Aichi. The highlight of the two-day event is the evening festival in which a dozen boats, each decorated with nearly 400 paper lanterns, float down the Tenno River. The festival honors the deity Gozu Tenno. This festival also takes place in Tokyo.
