= Sannō Matsuri =

Major Shinto festival in Tokyo held biennially in June

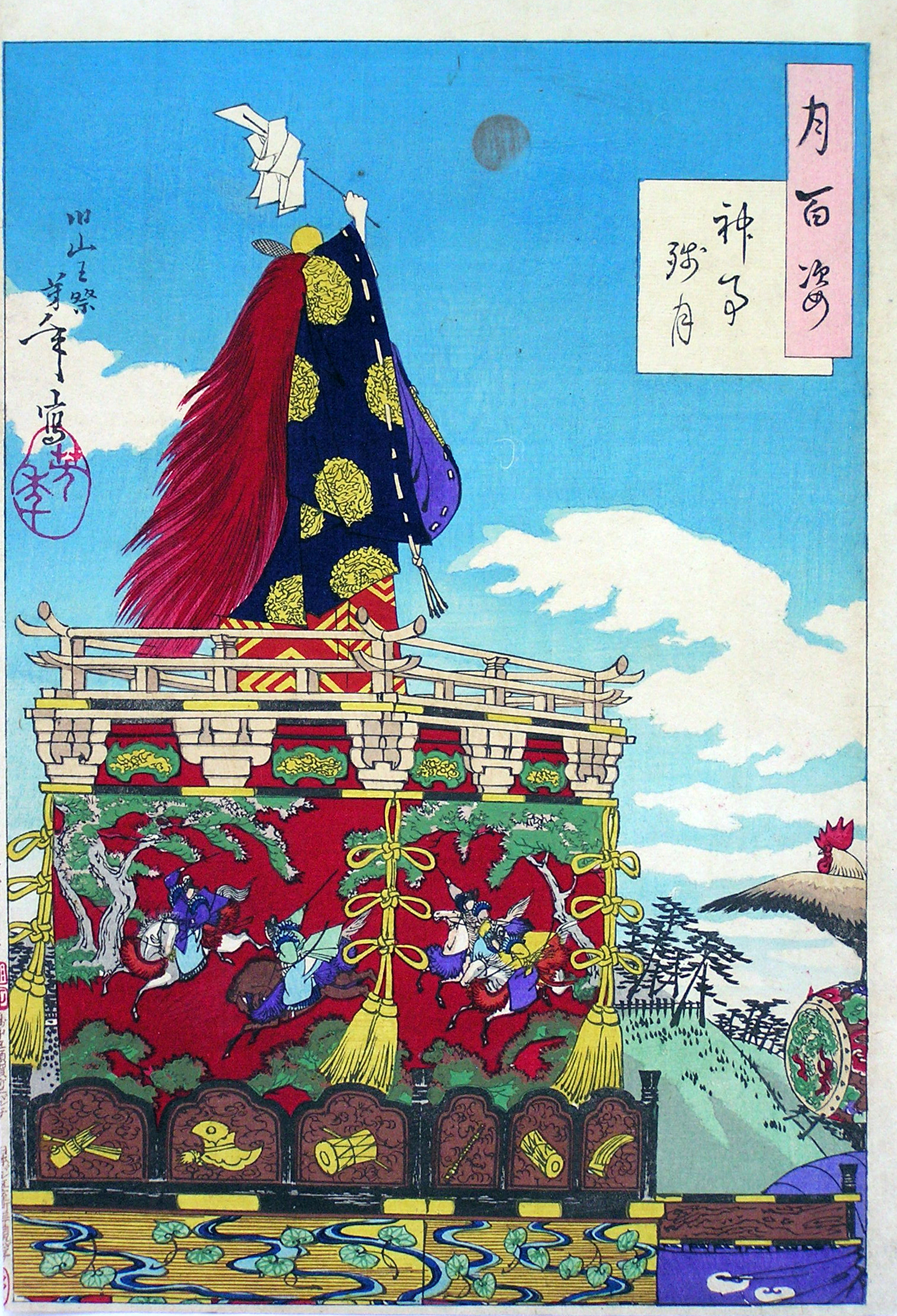
Depiction of the festival from Yoshitoshi's One Hundred Aspects of the Moon. The print shows a float with a dancer impersonating the Dragon King passing Edo castle.

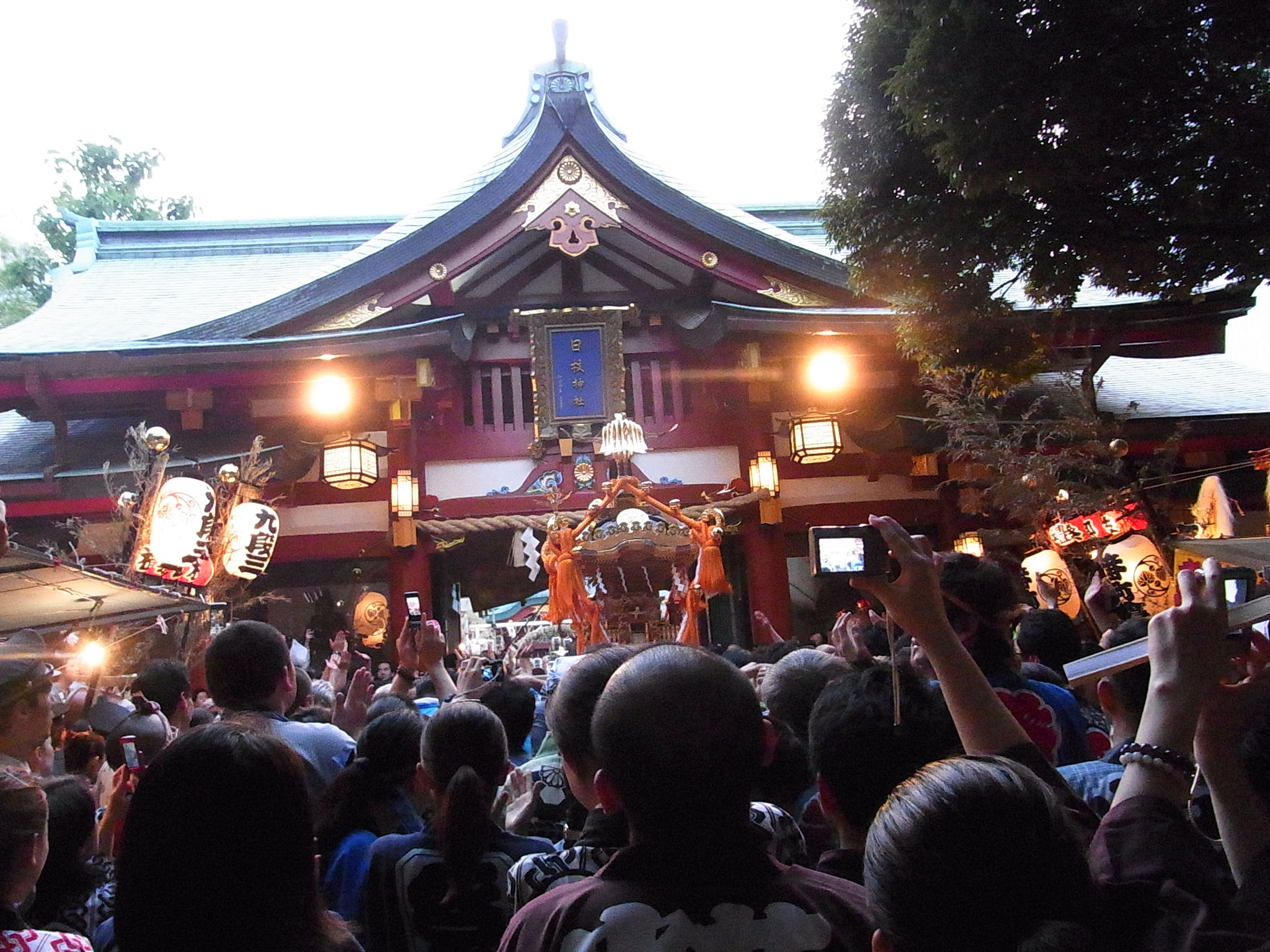
Hie Shrine

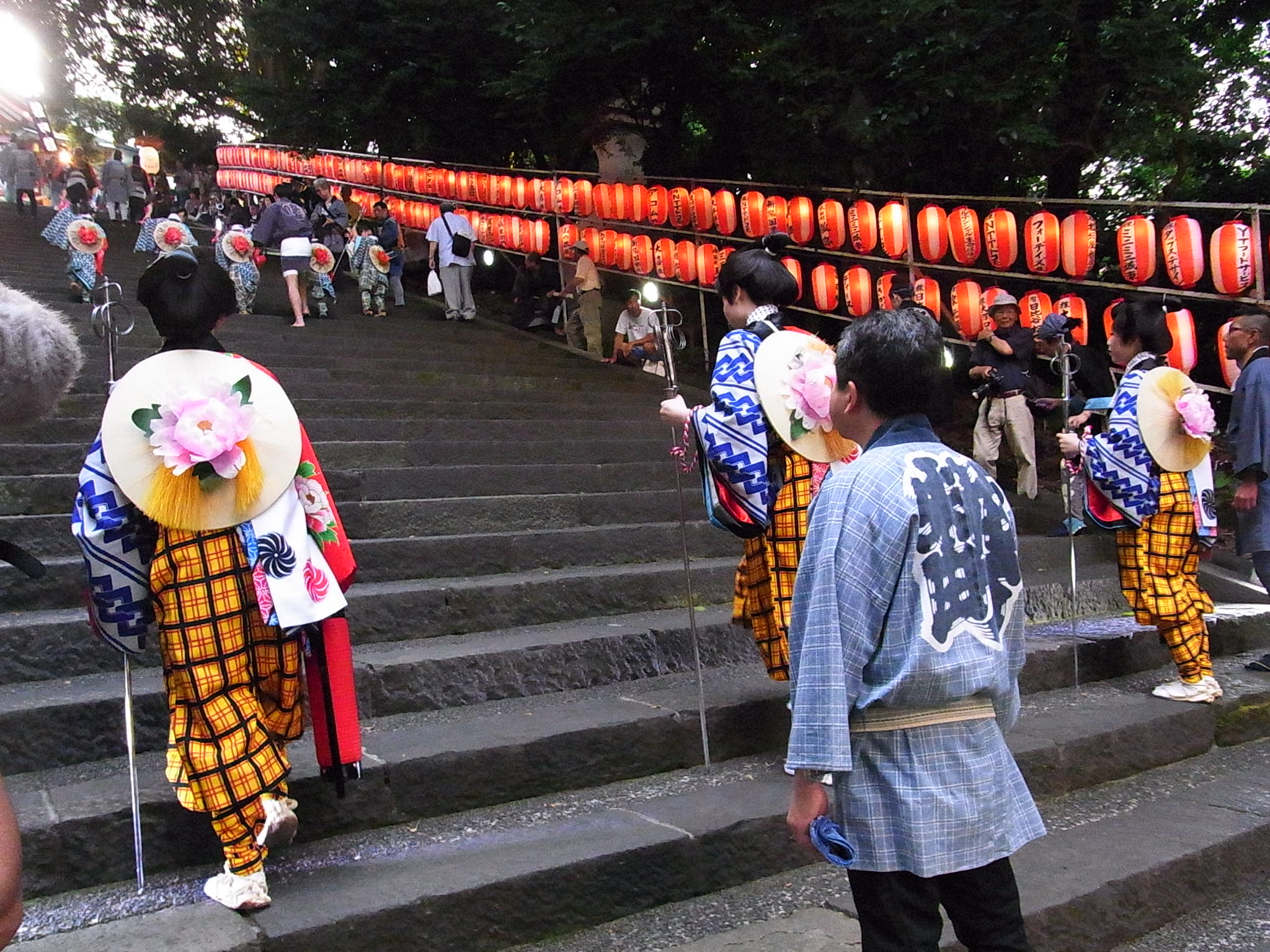
At Otoko-zaka, in Hie Shrine

Sannō Matsuri (山王祭) or the Sannō Festival, is a major Shinto festival in Tokyo, along with the Fukagawa Matsuri and Kanda Matsuri. The Festival takes place annually in mid-June, but involves a procession called Shinkosai in even-numbered years only; annual celebrations encompass a number of activities and celebrations over a week, including the day-long Shinkosai (also called Jinkosai) parade through Nagatachō, Chiyoda, Tokyo.

== See also ==
- Culture of Japan
- Japanese calendar
- Japanese festivals
- Festivals in Tokyo
- List of Buddhist festivals
