= Shinko-shiki =

Religious ceremony

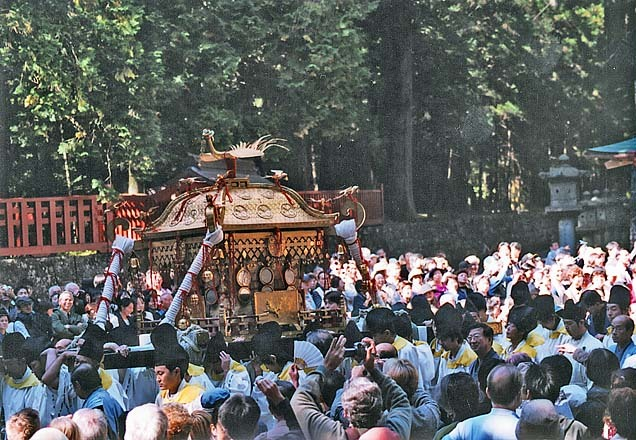
Shinko shiki for Tokugawa Ieyasu at Nikkō Tōshō-gū.

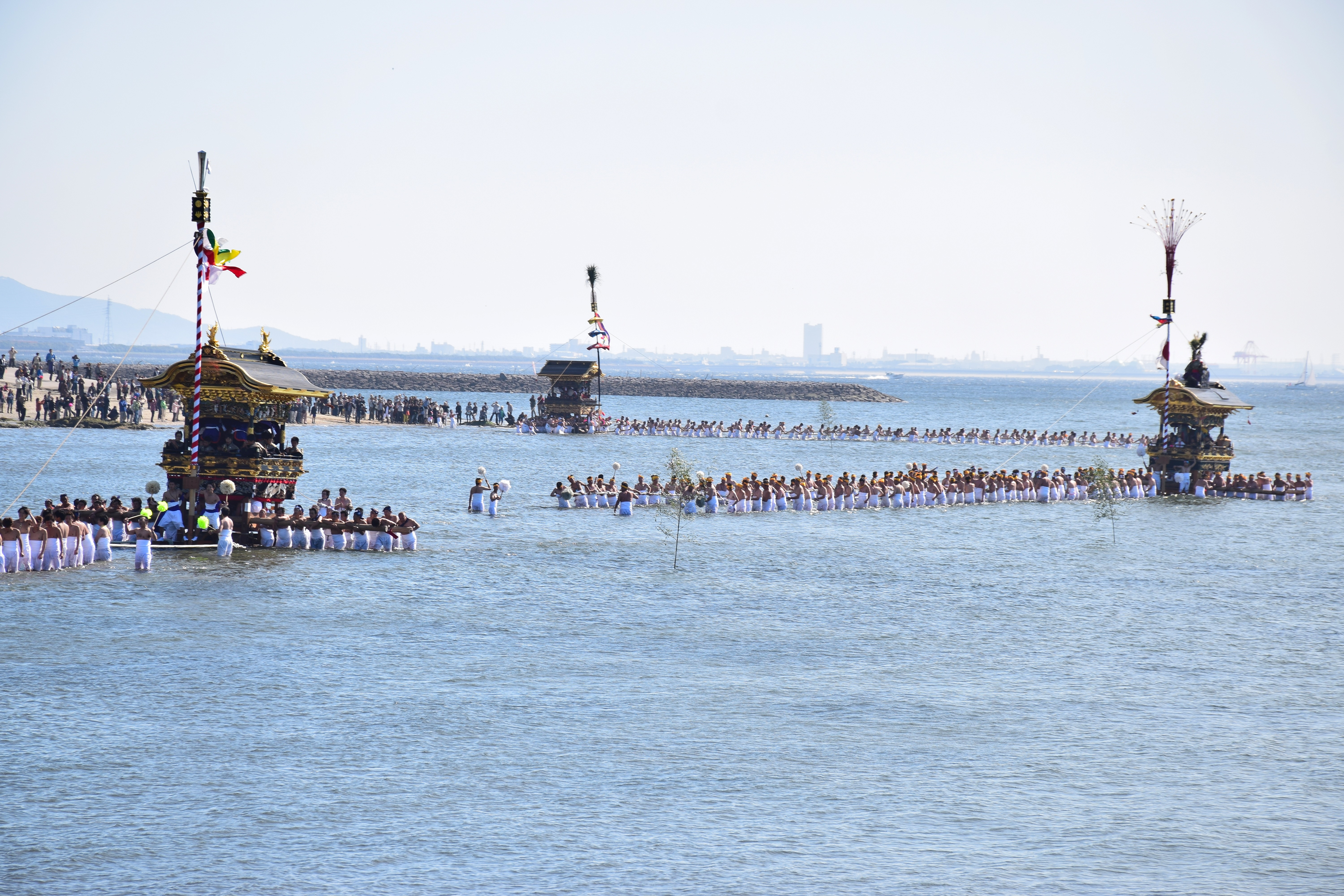
Underwater shinko shiki at Yatsurugi Shrine

Shinko-shiki (神幸式), also known as Shinko-sai (神幸祭), is a ceremonial practice within Shintoism involving the procession of a kami's shintai, or divine object. The shintai of the Kami is transferred from the primary Shinto shrine to a Mikoshi, a portable shrine, as part of the ritual. Typically, this ceremony occurs within the context of an annual festival hosted by a shrine. The procession is regarded as a means through which the Kami may inspect and validate the boundaries of a particular neighborhood or parish.

The prominent feature of the procession involves a group of participants who proceed either on foot or through various modes of transportation along a predetermined route. These parades necessitate organizational efforts and resources, commonly arranged as integral components of a shrine's ceremonial or associated endeavors.

This festival may occur on both land and water, with the route and destinations typically adhering to established traditions. Costumes and specific rituals often feature as part of the festivities. Occasionally referred to as "O-watari," (お渡り) the festival encompasses a range of ceremonial practices and observances.

The Gion Matsuri held at Yasaka Shrine serves as a well-known illustration of the Shinko-sai ritual.

Shinko-shiki is primarily linked with the Kami's visitation to its adherents, although interpretations and ceremonial practices can vary significantly.

For example, the Tokyo Shinko-shiki tends to be lively with a focus on revelry and alcohol consumption, whereas in Yuzawa, it is characterized by a more subdued and formal atmosphere.
