= Kappa Matsuri =

Kappa Matsuri (かっぱ祭り) is a Japanese festival in honor of the mythical Kappa. It is held during summer. Places where it is celebrated include Tokyo, Ushiku, Komaki, and Misawa.
