= Fukagawa Matsuri =

Festival in Tokyo

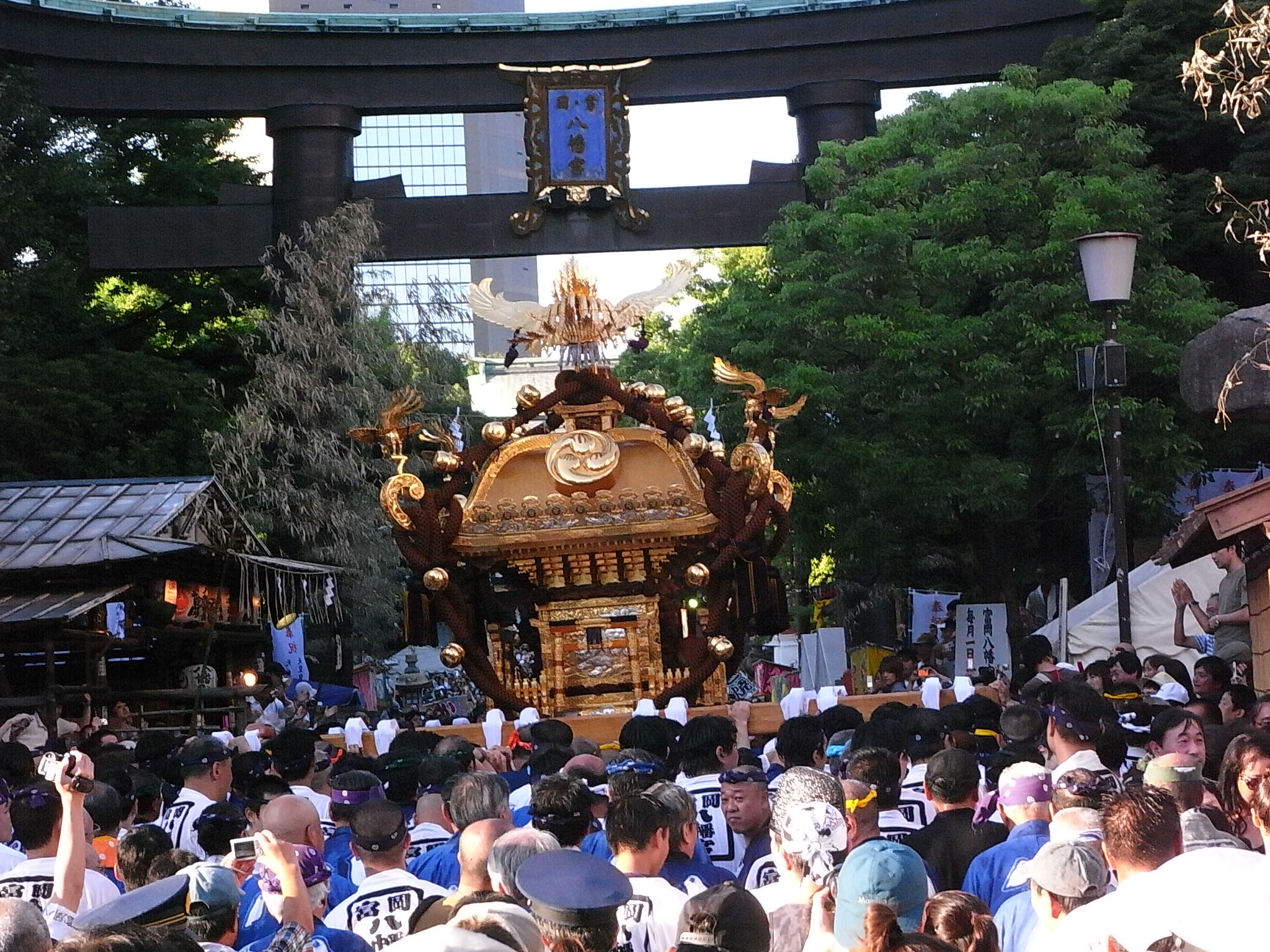

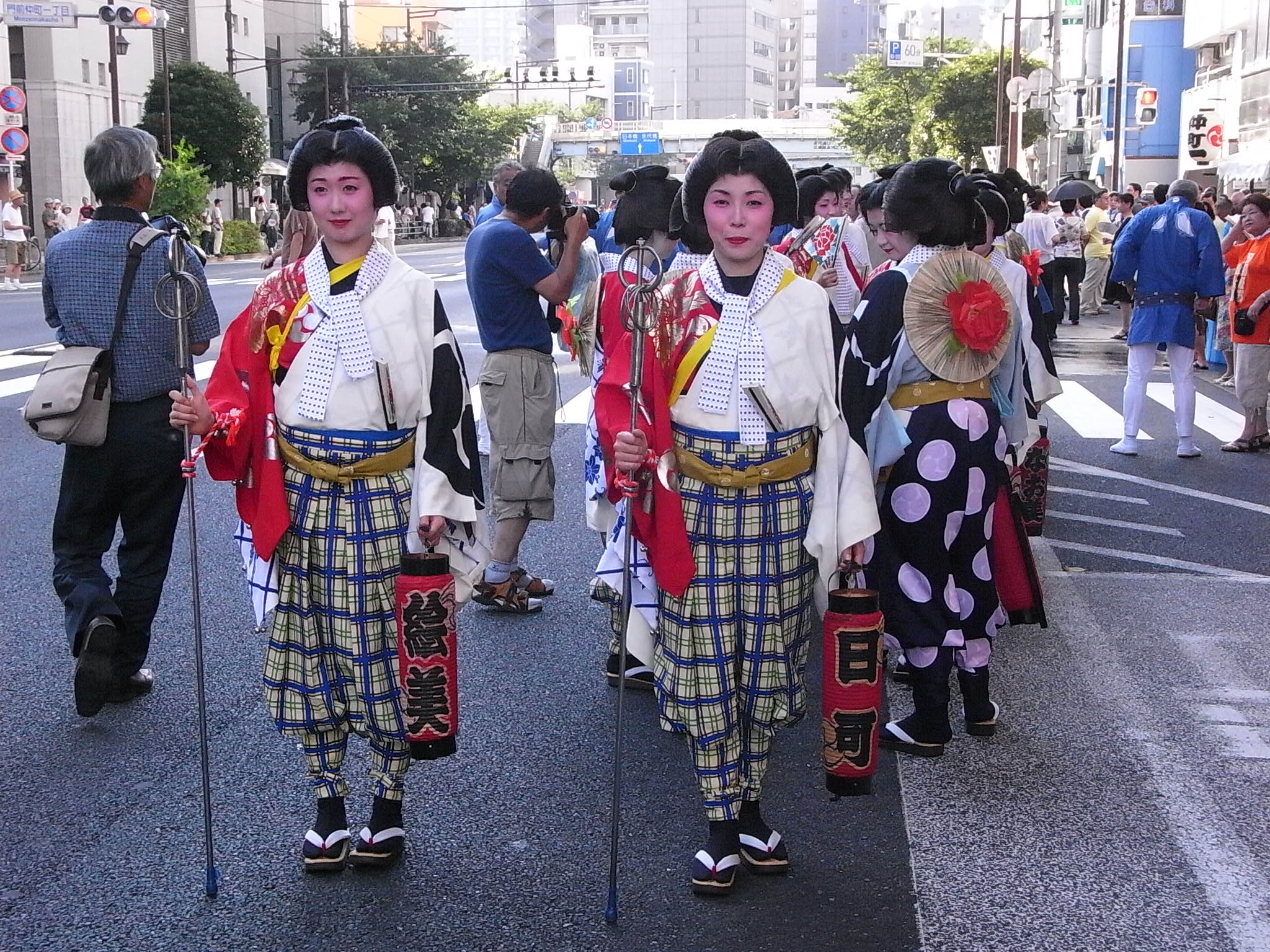

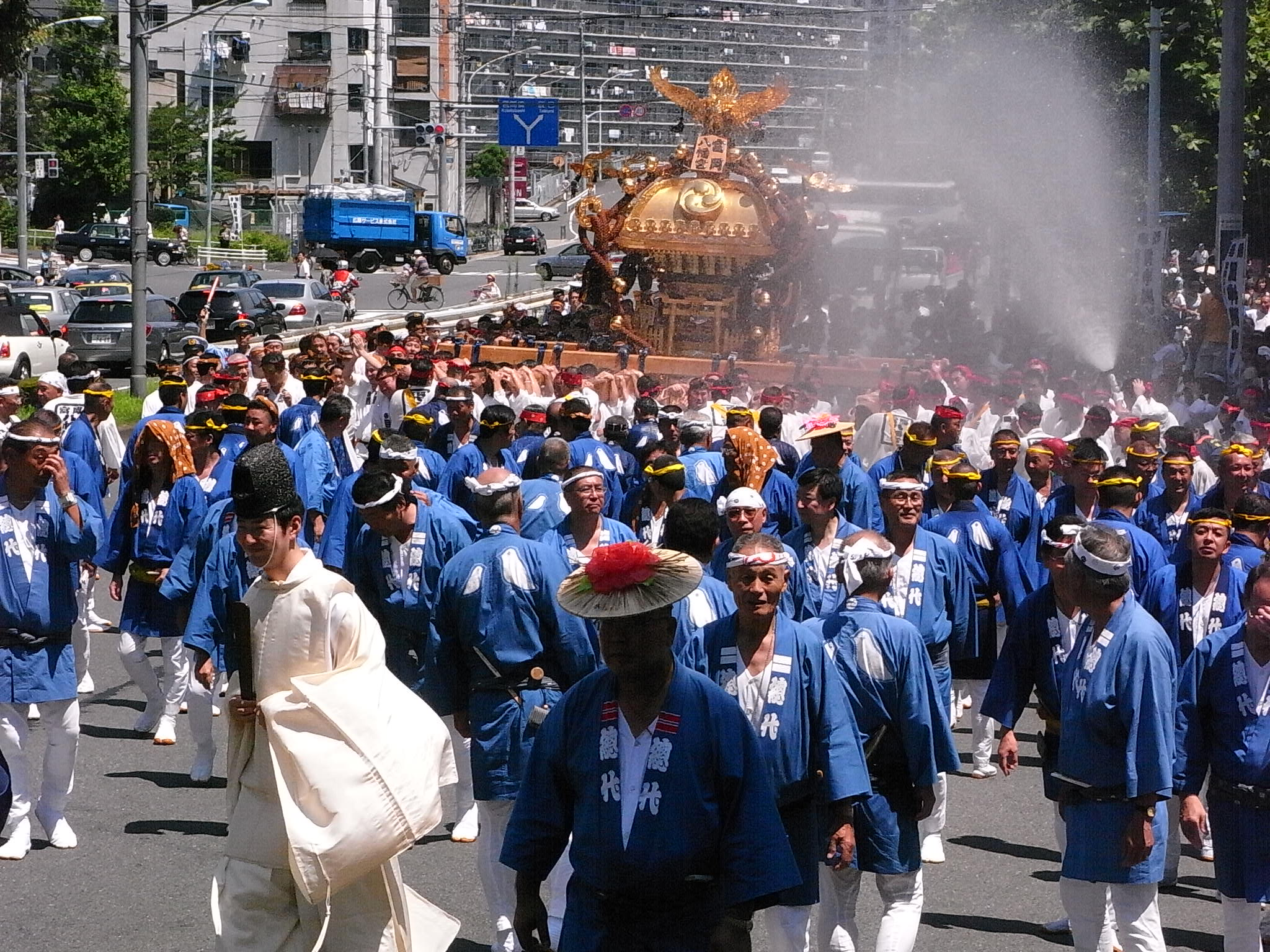

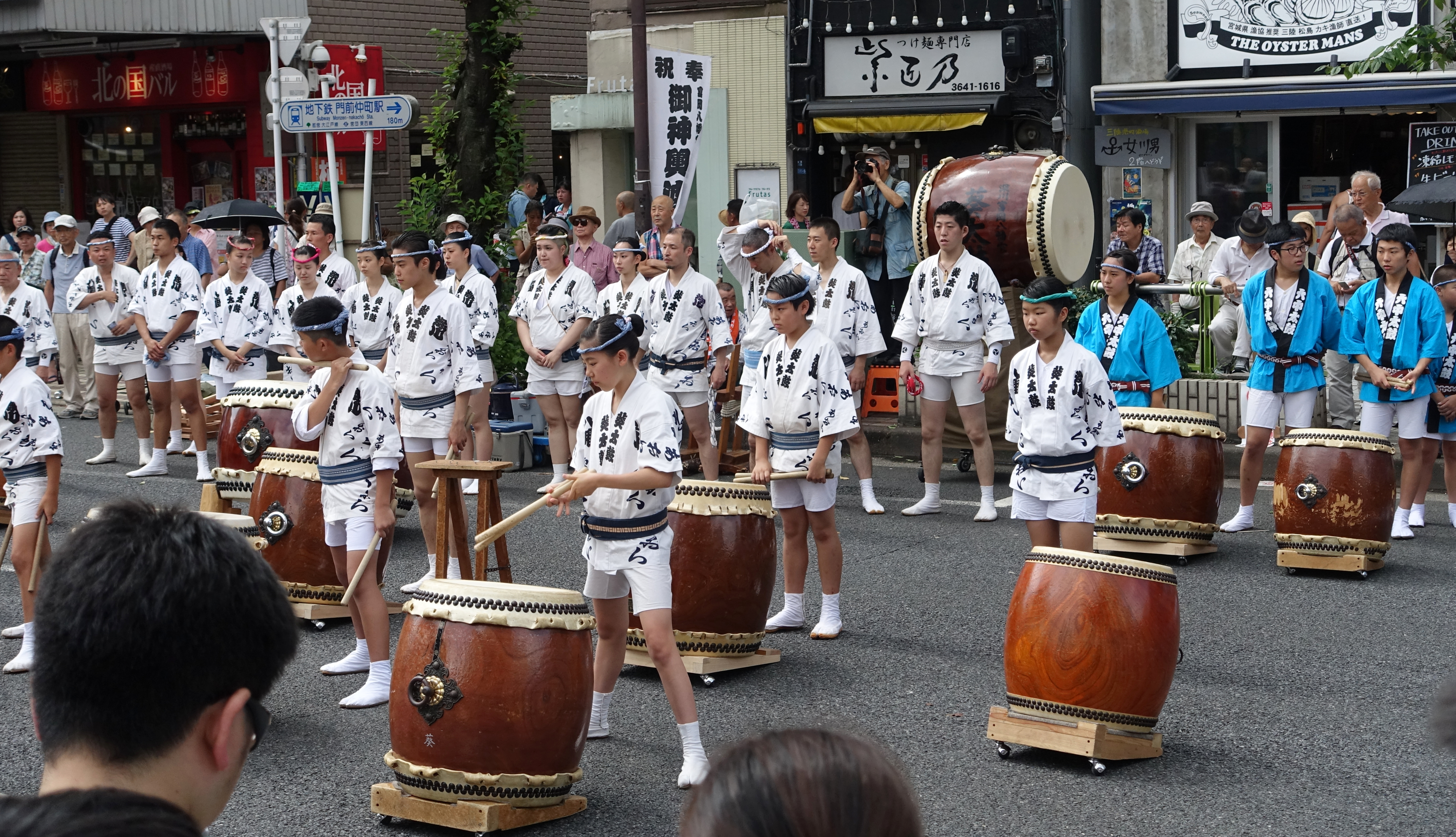

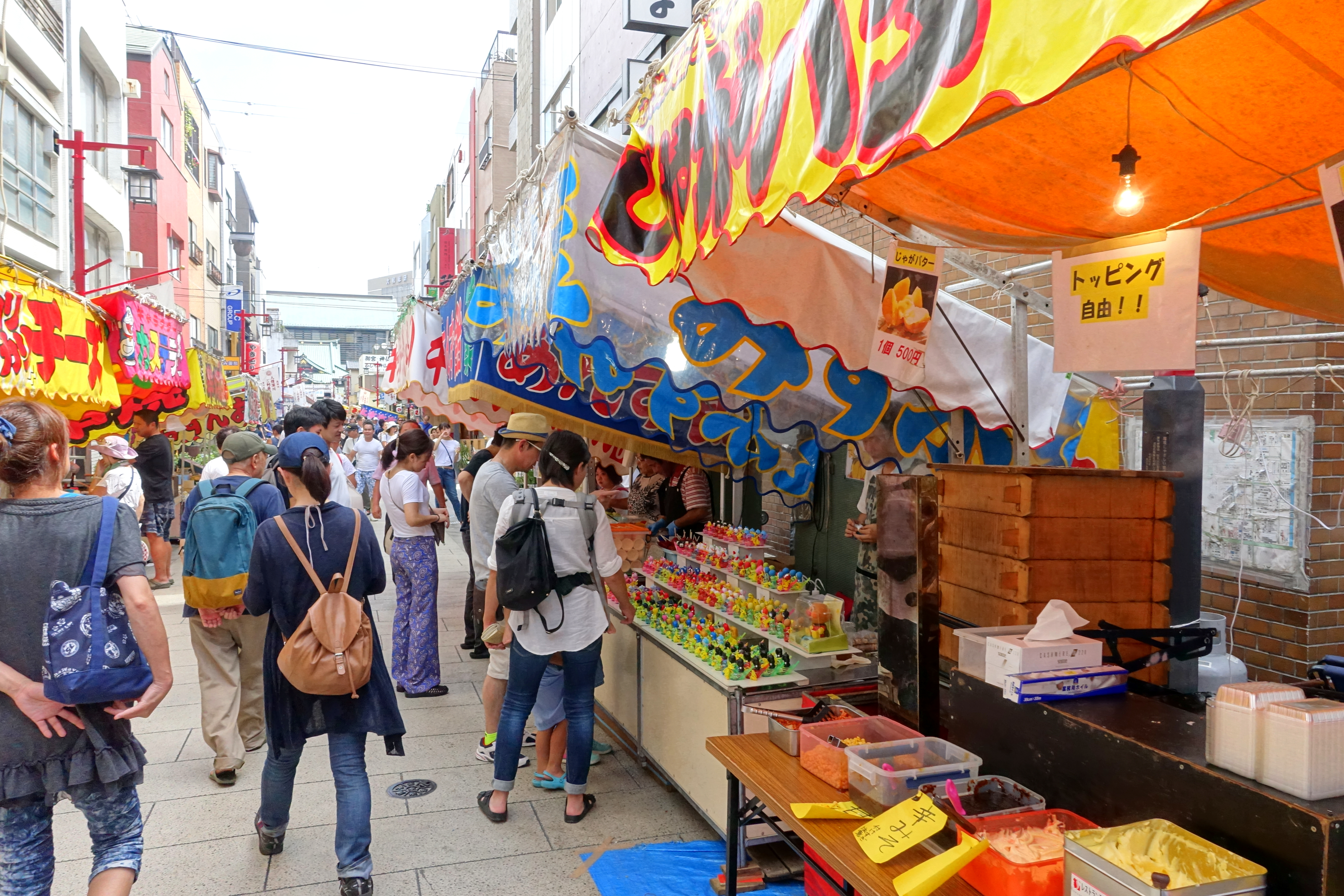

Fukagawa Matsuri (深川祭, Fukagawa Matsuri; formerly 深川八幡祭 Fukagawa Hachiman Matsuri) or the Fukagawa Festival, is one of the three great Shinto festivals of Tokyo, along with the Kanda Matsuri and Sannō Matsuri.

The Fukagawa Matsuri is held annually in mid-August by the Tomioka Hachiman Shrine in Koto, Tokyo. Tomioka Hachimangu, also known as Tomioka Yawata shrine, is Fukagawa's greatest shinto shrine, and was established in 1627. The festival, is believed to date back to 1642, and is one of the three greatest festivals of Edo, together with Sanno Matsuri of Kojimachi Hie Shrine and Kanda Matsuri of Kanda Shrine.

== See also ==
- Culture of Japan
- Japanese calendar
- Japanese festivals
- Festivals in Tokyo
