= Tomioka Hachiman Shrine =

Hachiman shrine in Tokyo, Japan

Tomioka Hachiman Shrine 富岡八幡宮
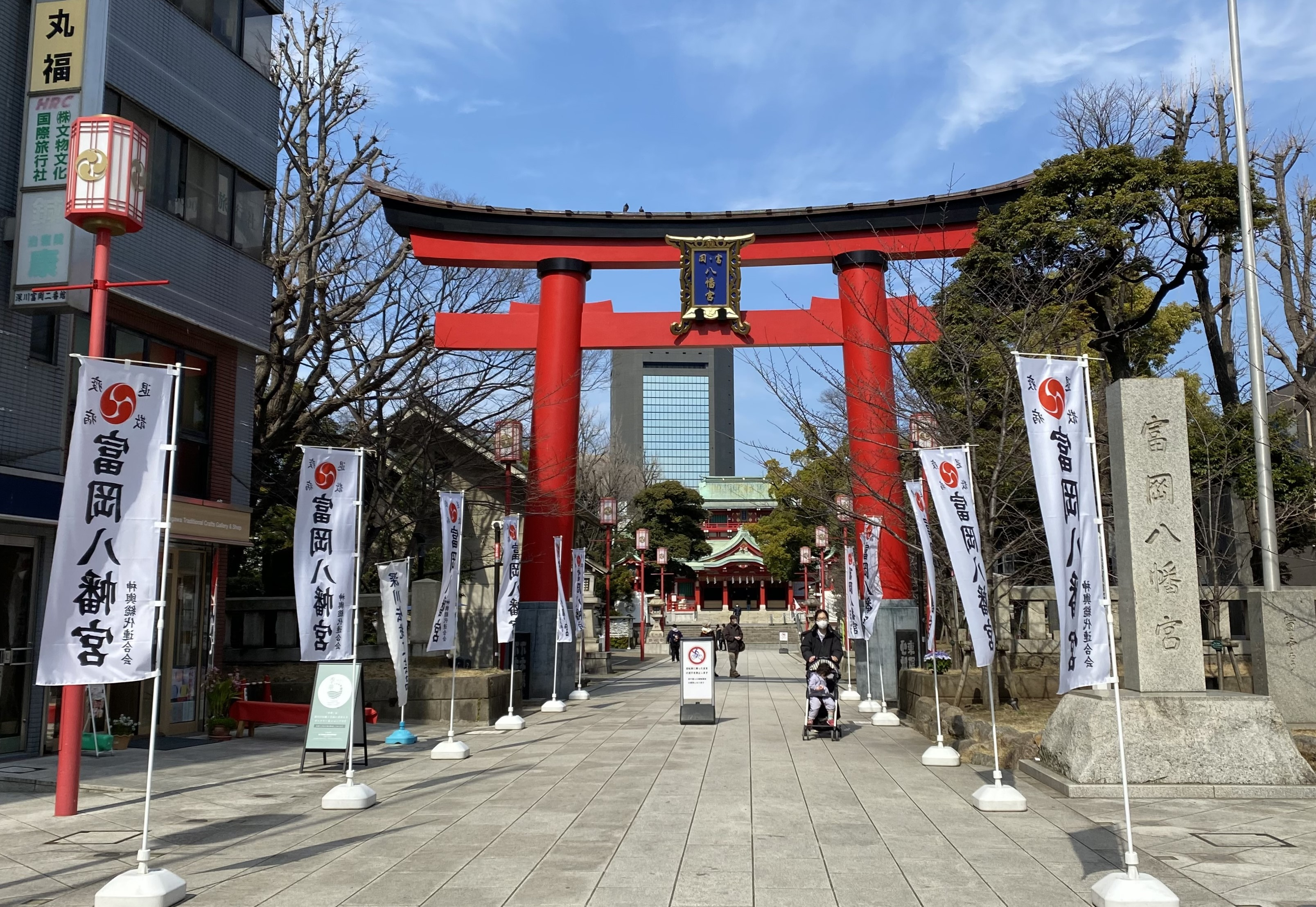
- Tomioka Hachiman in 2022

- Location within Japan

Religion
- Affiliation: Shinto
- Deity: Hachiman
- Type: Hachiman Shrine

Location
- Location: Tomioka, Kōtō, Tokyo, Japan
- Interactive map of Tomioka Hachiman Shrine 富岡八幡宮
- Coordinates: 35°40′18.31″N 139°47′58.50″E

Architecture
- Established: 1627 (Kan'ei 4)

Website
- www.tomiokahachimangu.or.jp

Tomioka Hachiman Shrine (富岡八幡宮, Tomioka Hachimangū) is the largest Hachiman shrine in Tokyo.

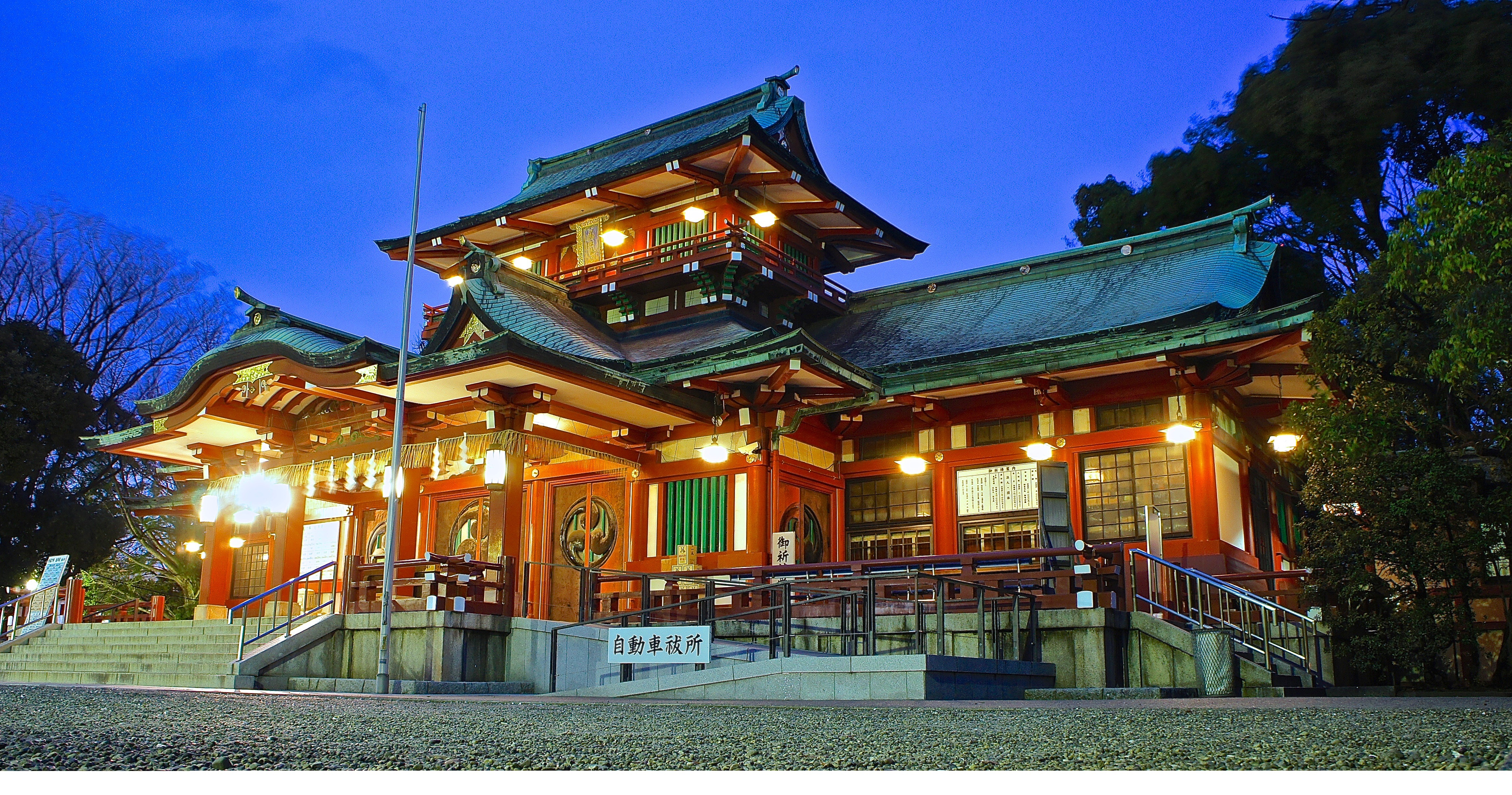
Tomioka Hachimangu light up

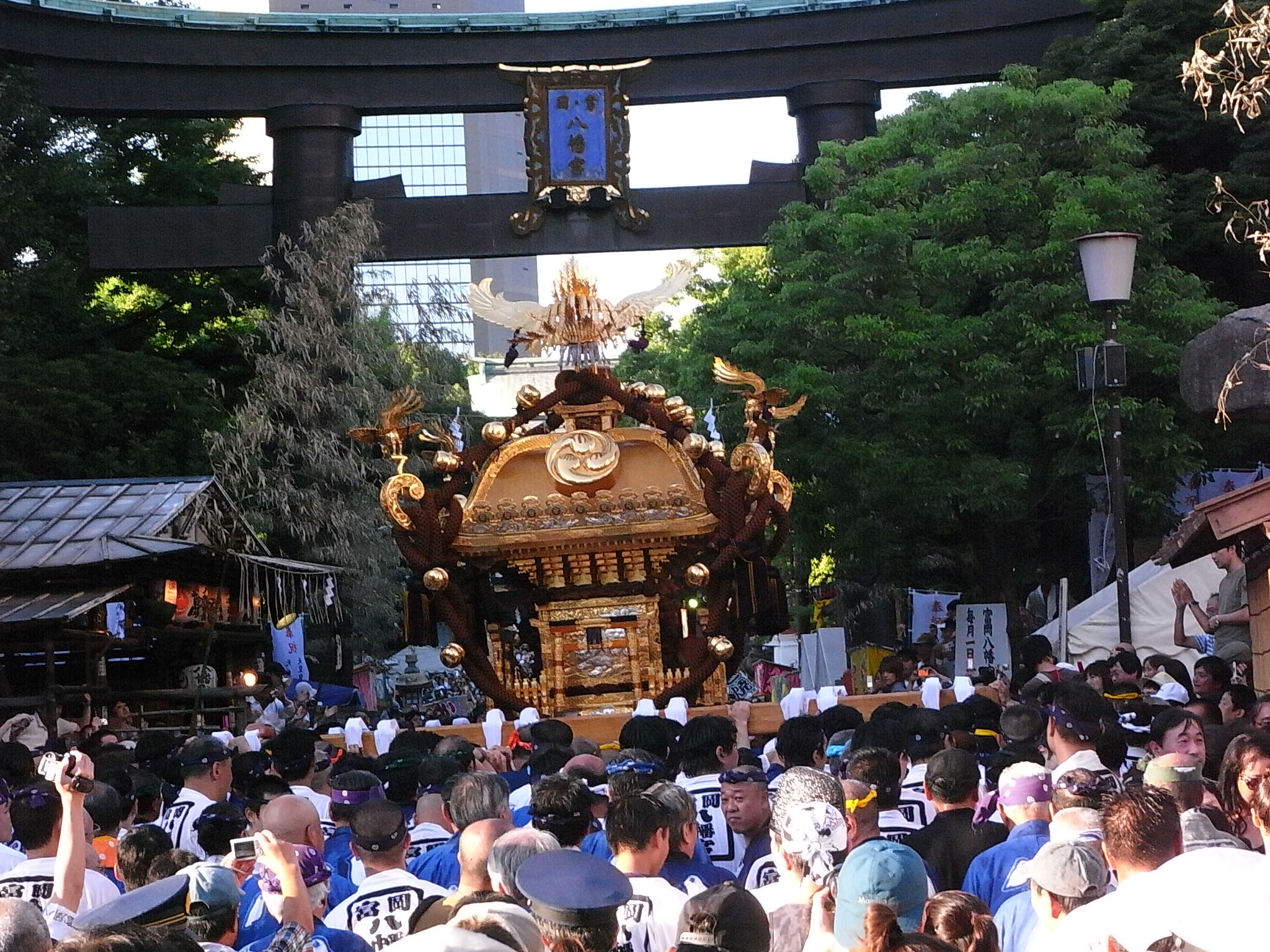
Fukagawa Matsuri

== History ==
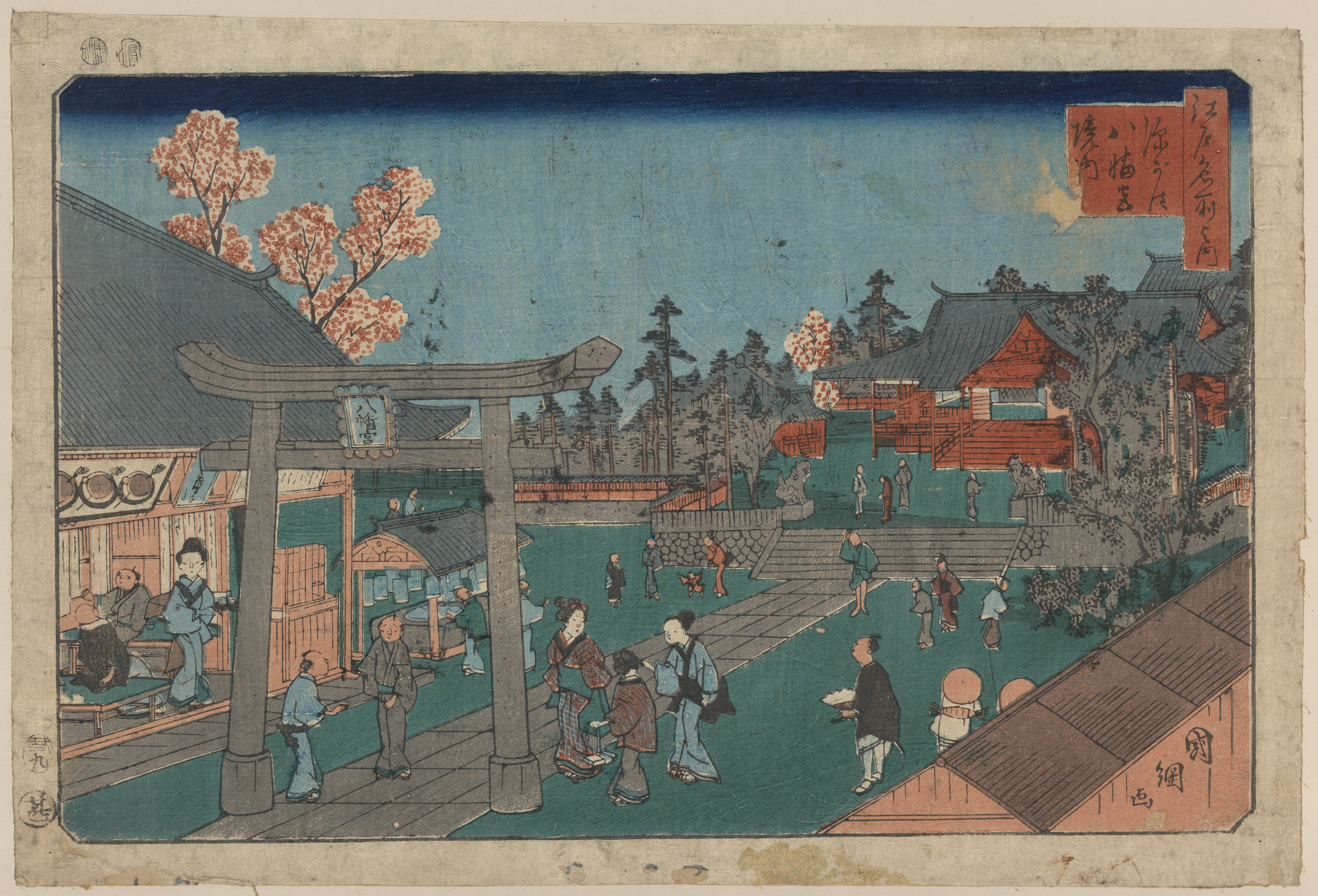
Ukiyo-e woodcut print of the shrine by Utagawa Kuniteru, 1853.

The shrine was established in Fukagawa in 1627 (399 years ago) with reclamation of a shoal. Hachiman, whom the shrine reveres, was also a local kami of the Minamoto clan, thus the shrine received cordial protection by the Tokugawa shogunate. On the other hand, the shrine was revered from the people of shitamachi, and familiar as "Hachiman of Fukagawa".

During the Meiji period, the shrine lost the cordial protection it had enjoyed during the Edo period. It was, however, chosen as Tokyo Ten Shrines (東京十社, Tokyo Jissha) by the Meiji government, despite being considered of inferior status relative to Hikawa Shrine and other major shrines which the government had provided.

On 10 March 1945 (81 years ago), the shrine was burned down during the bombing of Tokyo. On 18 March 1945, Emperor Shōwa, who was inspecting the burned area, visited here and received the explanation about the damage in precincts. Upon returning to his palace, the emperor described his impression to Hisanori Fujita, his Grand Chamberlains, comparing the effects to the Great Kantō earthquake of 1923 which he had seen when Crown Prince:

It is far more tragic feeling in case of this time. Concrete remains etc. pain my heart further. It is miserable. Grand chamberlain! Tokyo also became a burnt ground at last by this.

After the war, two stone monuments to commemorate the visit were built in precincts.

In June 2017, the shrine decided to leave the control of Association of Shinto Shrines.

On 7 December 2017, the chief priestess of the shrine, Nagako Tomioka, was stabbed to death, reportedly by her brother Shigenaga Tomioka. The attacker's wife also took part in the attack according to the police, injuring the priestess' driver. Her brother later stabbed his wife to death before committing suicide. A bloodied sword and knives were found at the scene.

== Sumo ==
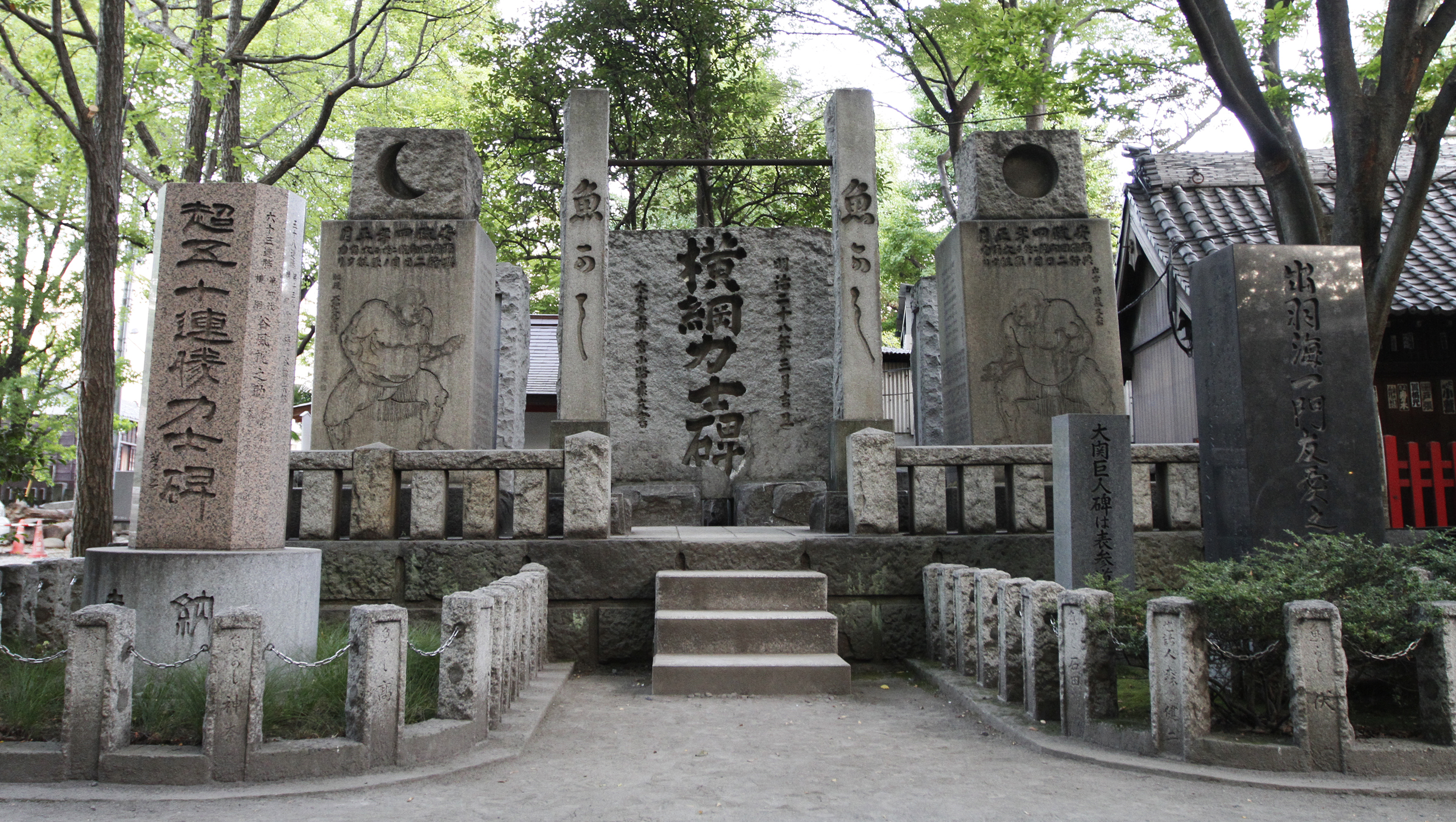
Yokozuna Stone (center) and other memorial stones related to sumo.

Tomioka Hachiman Shrine is also known as the birthplace of Kanjin-zumō (勧進相撲), founded in 1684 and origin of the current professional sumo.

Two basho (Spring and Autumn) were held at the shrine every year under the permission of the shogunate, and banzuke and other major systems were created in this period. After almost eighty years, basho had been held also in other places in Edo (Tokyo), then Ekōin came to hold all basho since 1833. In Meiji period (1868–1912), sumo strengthened the relation with Shinto to survive because of losses of supports from the shogunate and daimyōs, who lost power by the Meiji Restoration, thus the Shinto shrine came to be valued further by sumo.

In 1900 (Meiji 33), the stone monument to commend successive yokozuna, the Yokozuna Stone (横綱力士碑, Yokozuna Rikishi-hi), was built by Jinmaku Kyūgorō, the 12th yokozuna. Now, the stone inscribed with the shikona of all yokozuna until Terunofuji Haruo, the 73rd yokozuna, and "unrivaled rikishi" Raiden Tameemon. The shrine has many other stone monuments related to sumo.

Thus, when a rikishi reaches the rank of yokozuna, a dedication in the form of dohyō-iri is done at the shrine.
