= Mikoshi =

Palanquin Shrine in Shinto

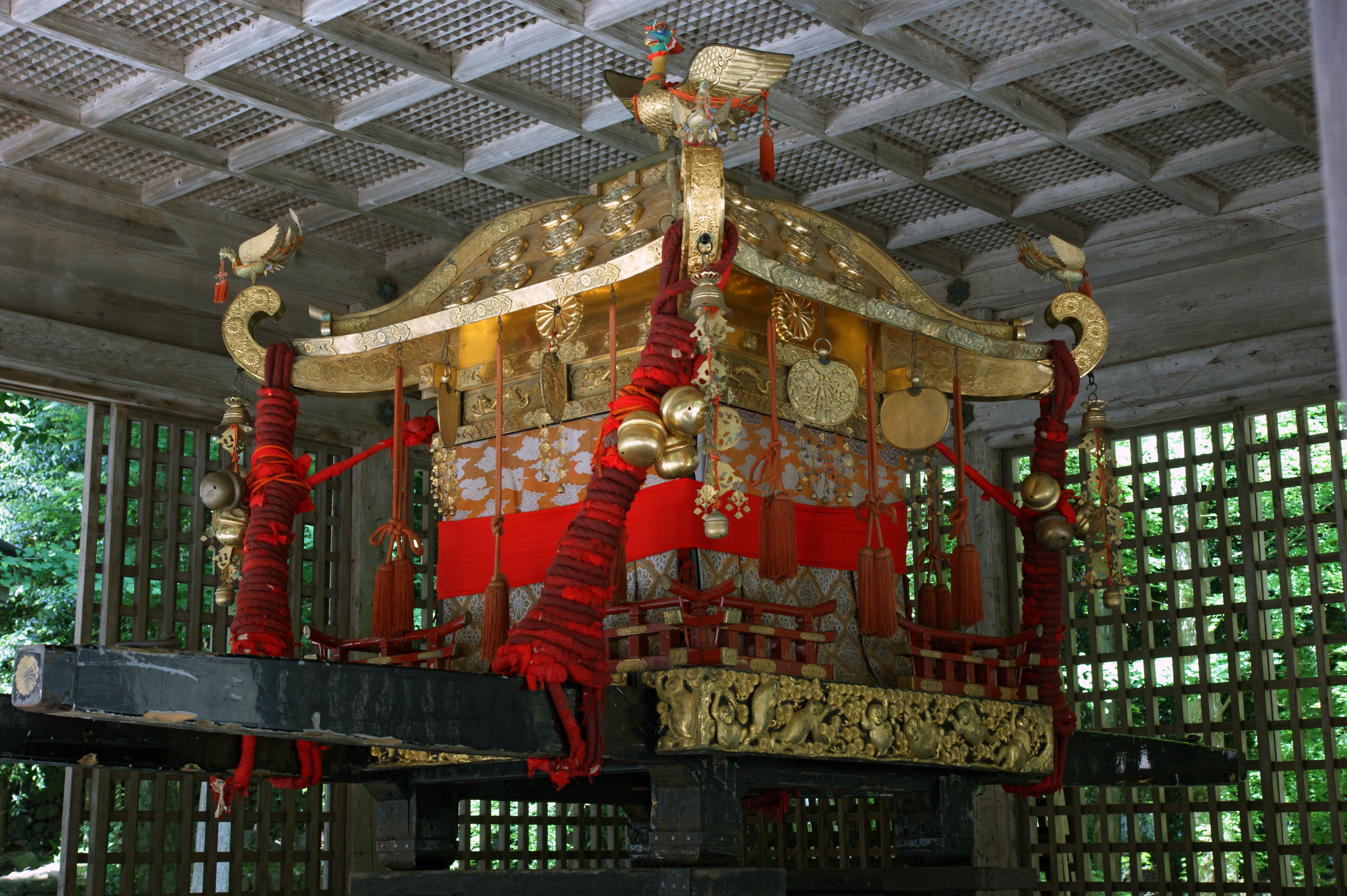
A mikoshi of Hiyoshi-taisha

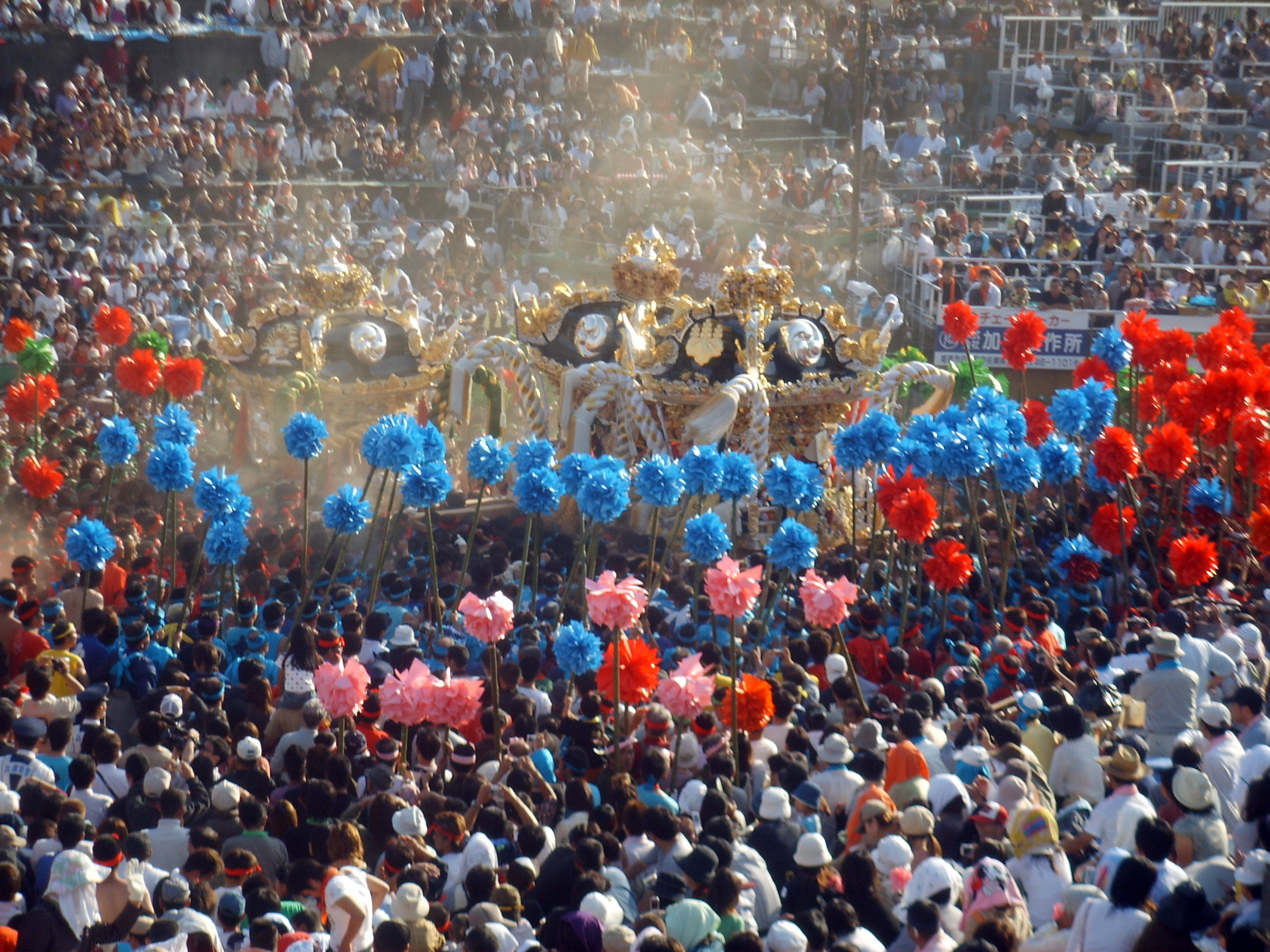
Mikoshi fighting on Nada-no-Kenka Matsuri at Himeji

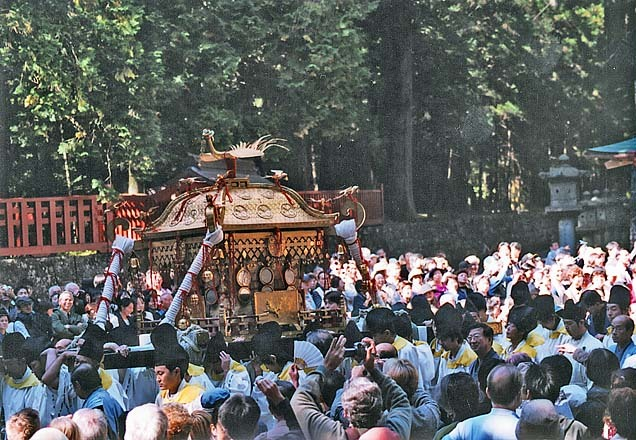
This mikoshi enshrines Tokugawa Ieyasu at the Tōshō-gū in Nikkō.

A mikoshi (Japanese: 神輿) is a sacred religious palanquin (also translated as portable Shinto shrine). Shinto followers believe that it serves as the vehicle to transport a deity in Japan while moving between main shrine and temporary shrine during a festival or when moving to a new shrine. Often, the mikoshi resembles a miniature building, with pillars, walls, a roof, a veranda and a railing.

Often the Japanese honorific prefix o- (お) is added, making omikoshi (お神輿).

== History ==
The first recorded use of mikoshi was during the Nara period. Among the first recorded uses was when in the year 749, the deity Hachiman is said to have been carried from Kyushu to Nara to worship the newly-constructed Daibutsu at Tōdai-ji. As the head shrine of all Hachiman shrines in Japan, Usa Jingū in Ōita Prefecture, Kyushu is said to be the birthplace of mikoshi.

== Shapes ==
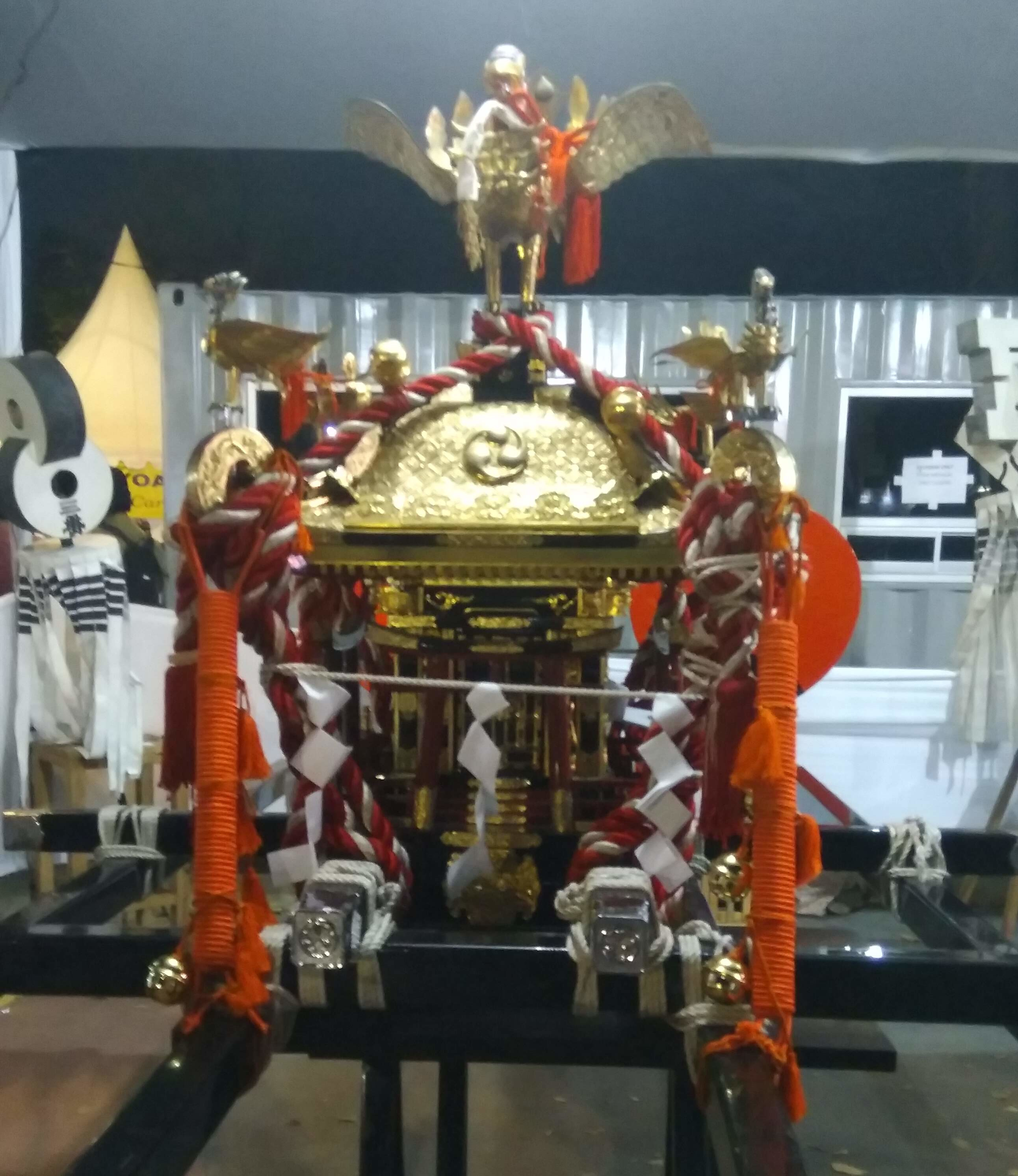
A mikoshi in Jak Japan Matsuri 2018

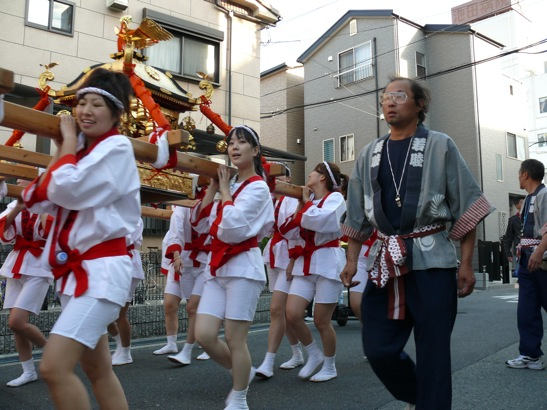
Woman mikoshi

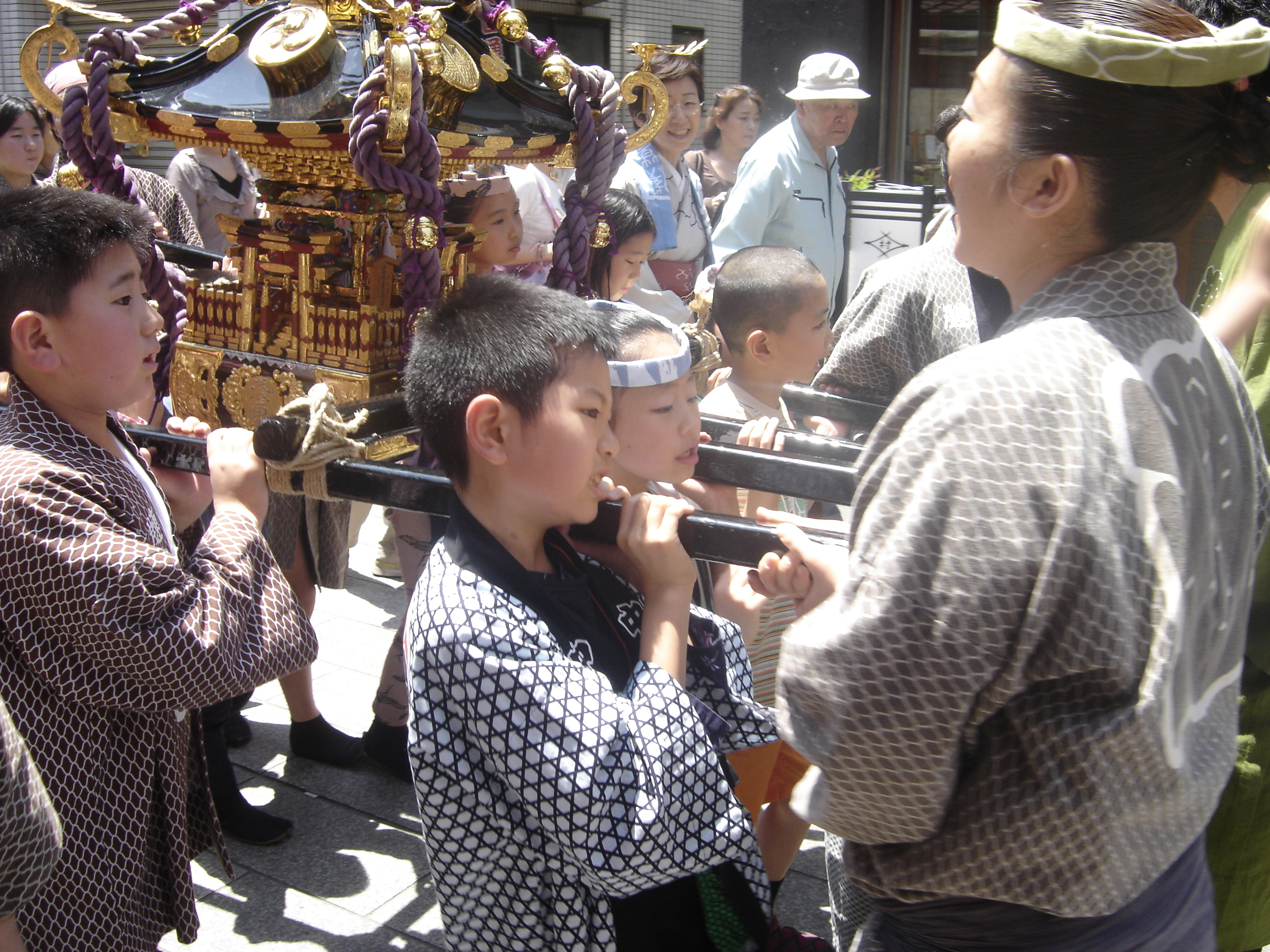
Child mikoshi (Sanja Matsuri)

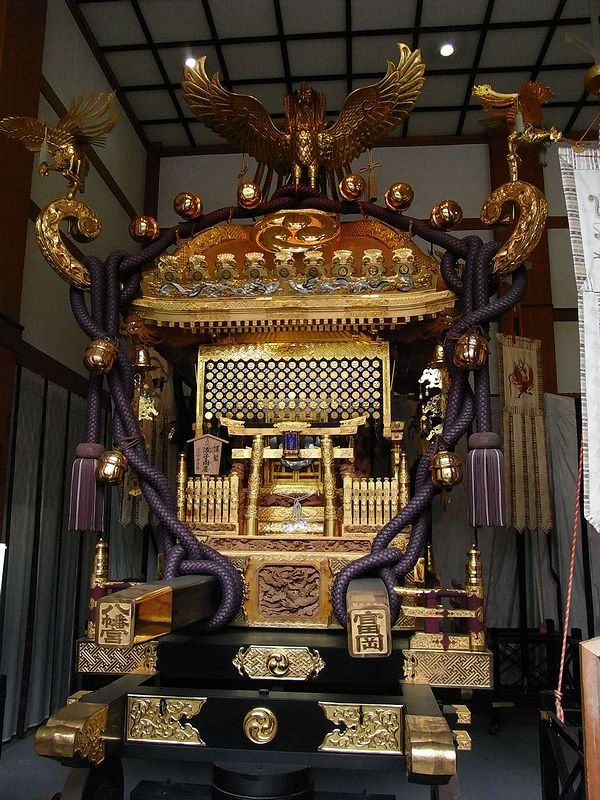
Japan's largest (Tomioka Hachiman Shrine)

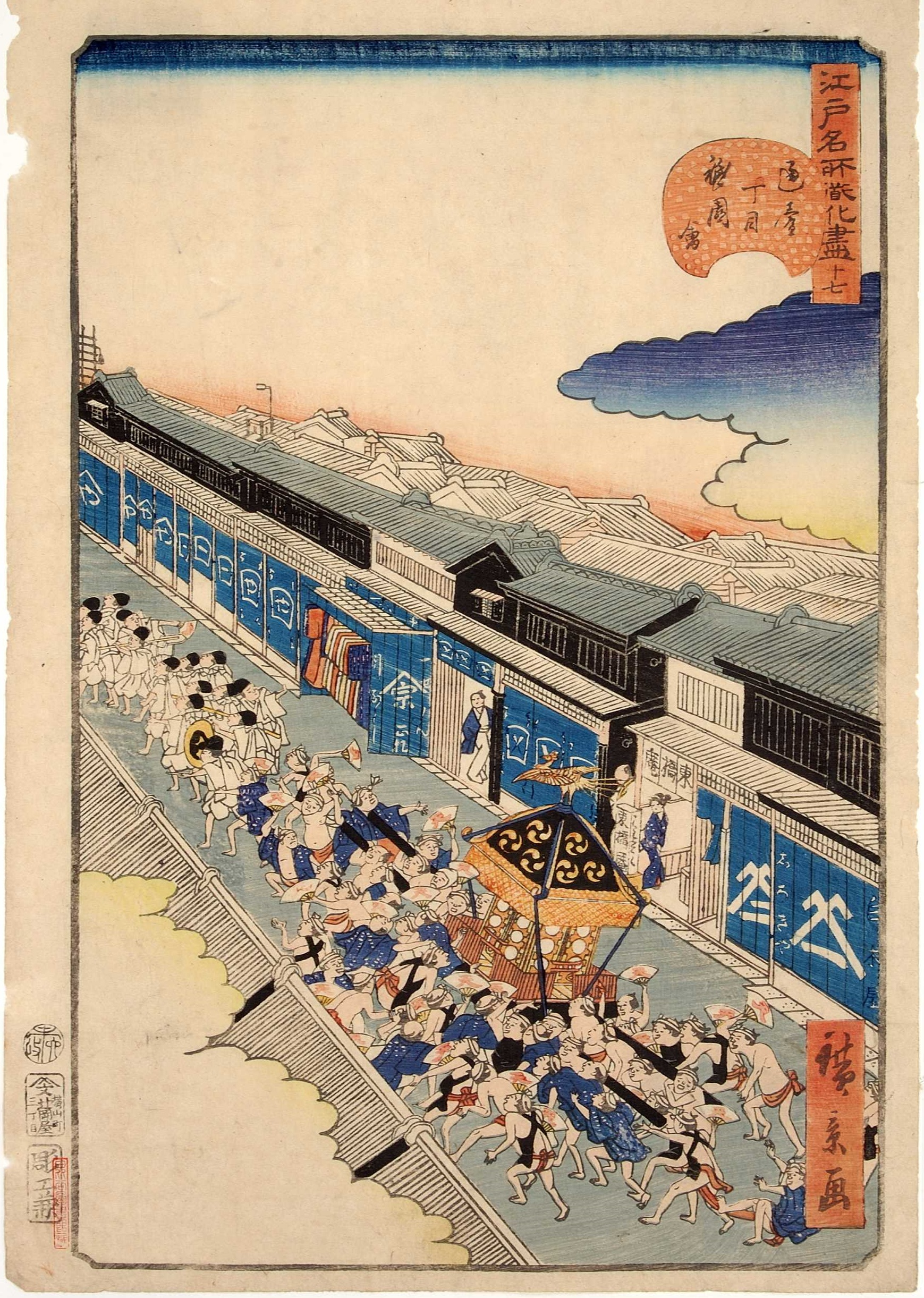
Utagawa Hirokage

Typical shapes are rectangles, hexagons, and octagons. The body, which stands on two or four poles (for carrying), is usually lavishly decorated, and the roof might hold a carving of a phoenix.

== Festival and flow ==
During a matsuri (Japanese festival) involving a mikoshi, people bear the mikoshi on their shoulders by means of two, four, or (rarely) six poles. They bring the mikoshi from the shrine, carry it around the neighborhoods that worship at the shrine, and in many cases leave it in a designated area, resting on blocks called uma (horse), for a time before returning it to the shrine. This resting place is known as the otabisho ("place of travel"), a term also used more broadly for any temporary shrine set up to host a kami during a festival procession; the practice echoes the earliest stages of Shinto shrine history, when only temporary structures, rather than permanent buildings, were erected to host the kami. Some shrines have the custom of dipping the mikoshi in the water of a nearby lake, river or ocean (this practice is called o-hamaori). At some festivals, the people who bear the mikoshi wave it wildly from side to side to "amuse" the deity (kami) inside.

== Methods of shouldering ==
The most common method of shouldering in Japan is hira-katsugi (平担ぎ) "flat carry". Bearers chant wasshoi (わっしょい) and may or may not toss and shake the mikoshi.

Other methods include:

(video) A local shrine being carried in Japan. As it is being carried the participants chant.

- Edomae (江戸前) "Edo style" is one famous way of shouldering observable at the Asakusa Sanja Festival. The shout is "say ya, soi ya, sah, sorya ... etc". The mikoshi is swayed rapidly, up and down and a little to the right and left.
- "Dokkoi | ドッコイ " is seen in Shonan in Kanagawa Prefecture. This shouldering style usually uses two poles. The mikoshi is moved up and down rhythmically, and more slowly than in the "Edomae style". One shout is "dokkoi dokkoi dokkoi sorya" and there is a song called a "Jink | lively song".
- Another one is "Odawara style | 小田原担ぎ " observed in Odawara (next to the Hakone). This is a peculiar way of shouldering in which multiple mikoshi meet and run (Holy Dash). The shout is "oisah;korasah/koryasah" and there is a song called a "Kiyari", a chant traditionally sung by workmen while pulling a heavy load and also by firemen. The bearers do not sway the mikoshi.
- In this "united" style, the mikoshi uses the full width of the road, moving from side to side and turning corners at full speed.

== See also ==
- Ark of Covenant, a similar portable shrine
- Glossary of Shinto
- Honden
- Matsuri float
