= Matsuri float =

Float that is pulled or carried during a festival in Japan

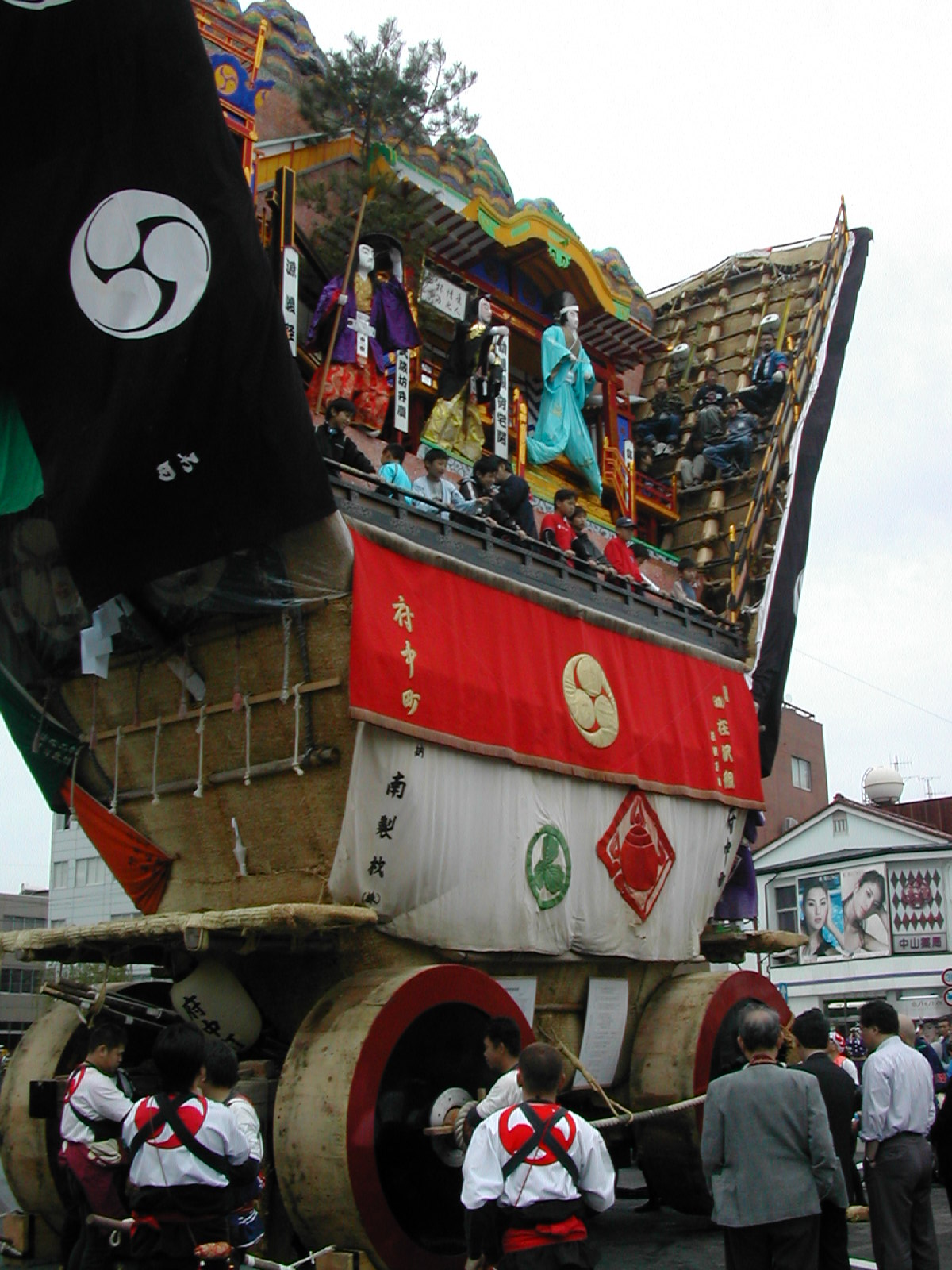
A Dashi float with people riding it and it being pulled by people

Matsuri float, also known as a dashi or sansha, is a type of float that is either pulled or carried during a festival in Japan. It is a general term used to refer to any float that is used for this purpose.

Dashi are one of three large structures at Japanese festivals alongside Yatai, and Mikoshi.

The terminology used for Matsuri floats can be inconsistent and varies by region in Japan. Some of the most common names used for these floats include Kasaboko, Danjiri, Yamahoko, Yamakasa, and Hikimono. Furthermore, Dashi and Yatai floats are sometimes called hikiyama and yama.

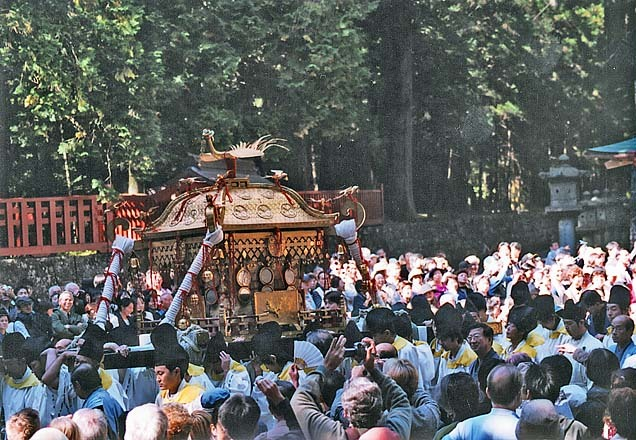
A mikoshi being carried by people

Dashi floats (山車) are an important component of Japanese festivals, and were originally designed to look like mountains. This reflects the concept of Mountain worship, where people believed that spirits resided in the mountains. The spears and swords that adorn the tops of the dashi serve as markers for these divine spirits, and people ride on top of the dashi to help welcome the gods. Dashi have wheels and are pulled by people, and can carry passengers as well.

Mikoshi is used to carry kami in a procession called Shinko-shiki. People carry the Mikoshi on their shoulders, while dashi is pulled by people. People are not allowed to ride on a mikoshi because it is only for gods.

Dashi floats can be seen in many festivals in Japan, such as the Takayama Matsuri in Gifu Prefecture and the Kanda Matsuri in Tokyo. During the Takayama Matsuri, ten dashi floats go through the city in the day and at night. The Kanda Matsuri has both dashi floats and mikoshi, with people wearing traditional clothes walking through the streets.

== See also ==
- Float (parade)
- Seki-juku (Tōkaidō)
- List of Important Intangible Folk Cultural Properties
- Intangible cultural heritage

== Sources ==
- "Hikiyama in Shinminato" (Shinminato, Toyama Board of education) published in October 1981.
- McPherson, Sean Harland. "Shifting Traditions: Architecture and Sculpture of Chita Peninsula Dashi." PhD Diss. U.C. Berkeley College of Environmental Design, Department of Architecture, 2001.
- "Takaoka Mikurayama" (Takaoka City Board of Education) 2000, published on 31 March 2000.
