= List of important intangible folk cultural properties =

This are 342 important intangible folk cultural properties of Japan.

== Criteria ==
1. It must exemplify something original in the Japanese people's everyday life in terms of origin and content, and be typical.
2. It must exemplify the process of evolution of some technique.
3. It must exemplify some local characteristic.

== Designated cultural properties ==
=== Manners and customs ===
==== Manufacture, livelihood ====
9 designations. All were designated under Criteria 1.

Name	Date	Remarks	Location	Image
Aizu rice planting festival (会津の御田植祭, aizu no otaue matsuri)	July 2 (Note: July 1 in leap years.) (Keitokumachi) and July 12 (Takada)	Rice planting festival as a prayer for abundant harvest held at Inari Shrine, Keitokumachi and at Isasumi Shrine.	Keitokumachi Kitakata and Takada Aizumisato, Fukushima	—
Jagamaita of Mamada (間々田のジャガマイタ, mamada no jagamaita)	May 5	Snake festival in which a 15 m (49 ft) long snake made of straw, fern and wisteria is paraded by children through the district. The event is a prayer for abundant harvest and good health.	Mamada Oyama, Tochigi	—
Spring Hoe Festival of Higoshi Shinmei Shrine (樋越神明宮の春鍬祭, higoshi shinmei-gū no haru kuwa matsuri)	February 11	Spring hoe festival including theatrical performances of various stages of the farming process. Seen as a prayer for abundant crops, the festival's earliest record is from 1798.	Shinmei Shrine, Tamamura, Gunma	—
Bonito Fishing Festival of Kōzushima (神津島のかつお釣り行事, kōzushima no katsuo tsuri gyōji)	August 2	Using a crude model boat of aotake (green bamboo), within the shrine precincts, bonito fishermen are simulating all stages of their work from departure, over fishing to return to the port. This is seen as a prayer for a good catch.	Monoiminamikoto Shrine, Kōzushima, Tokyo	—
Spiral Rice Planting of Sado (佐渡の車田植, sado no kuruma taue)	end of May	Seedlings are planted in a circular fashion by three or four workers while singing.	Sado, Niigata	—
Oku-noto no Aenokoto (奥能登のあえのこと)	February 9 and December 5	Agricultural festival of rice farmers on the Noto Peninsula in which the deity of the rice field is invited to the house and entertained. The December event is to express gratitude for the harvest, while the event in February is meant to ensure an abundant harvest. The ritual has been inscribed on the UNESCO Representative List of the Intangible Cultural Heritage of Humanity.	Okunoto, Ishikawa	—
Mibu Rice Planting (壬生の花田植, mibu no hana taue)	first Sunday in June	Rice-planting ritual starting with a performance of hayashi musicians welcoming the kami of the fields and decorated cows being led into the field. A phalanx of planting girls then carries out the actual planting accompanied by ondo songs, large and small drums, gongs and flutes. The event has been inscribed on the UNESCO Representative List of the Intangible Cultural Heritage of Humanity.	Kitahiroshima, Hiroshima	
Farming Rituals of Aso (阿蘇の農耕祭事, aso no nōkō saiji)	13th day of first month and 25th day of 9th month (Aso Shrine); 16th day of first month and 23rd, 24th days of 9th month (Kuninomiyako Shrine) (Note: Date in Japan's old lunisolar calendar)	A series of agricultural festivals associated with the four seasons and enacted as a prayer for abundant crops and as a thanks for the harvest, among these: rice field festival (onda matsuri), making the field (tatsukuri), fire swinging ritual (hifuri shinji), fūchinsai, nemurinagashi rite, hitaki fire rite, and the tanomi festival.	Aso, Kumamoto	—
Tanegashima Hōman Shrine Rice planting Festival (種子島宝満神社の御田植祭, tanegashima hōman jinja no otaue matsuri)	April 3	Ritual rice planting event accompanied by song and drums as a prayer for an abundant harvest.	Minamitane, Kagoshima	—

==== Life rituals ====
6 designations. All were designated under Criteria 1.

Name	Date	Description/Remarks	Location	Image
Izumiyama Mountain Worship (泉山の登拝行事, izumiyama no tohai gyōji)	July 25	An event in which young children between the age of 7 and 9 from the village of Izumiyama climb Mt. Nakui to worship at mountain shrines.	Sannohe, Aomori	—
Hata Oyamagake (羽田のお山がけ, hata no oyamagake)	15th and 16th day of 8th month	An event in which 7-year-old boys climb nearby Hanedayama to pray for their healthy growth.	Kesennuma, Miyagi	—
Kohata Banner Festival (木幡の幡祭り, kohata no hata matsuri)	First Sunday in December	An event, first attended by males around the age of 18, in which a procession of parishioners carrying colorful banners climb Kohatayama to worship at Okitsushima and Hayama shrines.	Nihonmatsu, Fukushima	—
Kawamata Coming-of-Age Ceremony (川俣の元服式, kawamata no genpuku shiki)	January 21	A traditional coming of age ceremony for 20-year-old males with roots in the late Edo period.	Nikkō, Tochigi	—
Iwatsuki Traditional Sumo Ring Entrance Ceremony (岩槻の古式土俵入り, iwatsuki no koshiki dohyōiri)	Sunday near October 21 (Kagiage) and every second year on the day before Respect for the Aged Day (Sasakubo)	A traditional sumo ring entrance ceremony performed by young boys as a prayer for the healthy growth of the children. No actual wrestling takes place.	Kagiage or Sasakubo, Iwatsuki, Saitama	—
Kasuga Bridegroom Pushing Festival (春日の婿押し, kasuga no muko-oshi)	One day before the Coming of Age Day	A series of events held for men and women who became married in the previous year. It concludes with a sagichō, burning of old omamori.	Kasuga Shrine, Kasuga, Fukuoka	—

==== Amusements, contests ====
11 designations, all under criterion 1.

Name	Date	Remarks	Location	Image
Kariwano tug of war (刈和野の大綱引き, Kariwano no ōtsuna-hiki)	15th day of 1st month	Tug of war between two parts of Kariwano town featuring a giant straw rope, 80 cm (31 in) diameter and over 200 m (660 ft) long, held to pray for a rich harvest.	Daisen, Akita	—
Sōma Wild horse racing (相馬野馬追, Sōma Nomaoi)	Last Sat., Sun. and Mon. of July (Note: Until 2010 the festival was held every year on July 23–25)	Horseriding festival with riders clad in samurai armour of the Sengoku period, organized by Ōta Shrine, Odaka Shrine (Minamisōma) and Sōma Nakamura Shrine (Sōma).	Sōma and Minamisōma Fukushima	
Dragon spirit festival of Chichibu Yoshida (秩父吉田の龍勢, chichibu yoshida no ryūsei)	Second Sunday in October	Shooting of homemade rockets from a scaffold structure, which when fired are meant to resemble dragons ascending to the heavens. The even is performed as appreciation for bountiful harvest.	Shimoyoshida, Chichibu, Saitama	Rocket with smoke in front of green mountain.
Bull wrestling (牛の角突きの習俗, Ushi no tsunotsuki no shūzoku)	some time between May and November (irregular)	Ancient bull fighting event and only of its kind on Honshu.	Nagaoka, Ojiya and Uonuma, Niigata	
Tsuruga Nishimachi tug of war (敦賀西町の綱引き, Tsuruga Nishimachi no tsuna-hiki)	January 15	Tug of war between two teams representing Daikoku and Ebisu. The year is said to bring a good harvest if Daikoku wins, and a good catch if Ebisu wins.	Tsuruga, Fukui	—
Tajima Kutani tug of war (但馬久谷の菖蒲綱引き, Tajima Kutani shōbu tsuna-hiki)	June 5	Tug of war between an adult and children group using a rope made of Japanese mugwort and sweet flag. If the adult group wins the 7th and final pull, it is said to become a good harvest. This is one of the five seasonal festivals (gosekku).	Shin'onsen, Hyōgo	—
Inaba tug of war (因幡の菖蒲綱引き, Inaba no shōbu tsuna-hiki)	5th day of 5th month closest weekend (Aoya); Sunday closest to the 5th day of the 5th month (Mizushiri, Hōgi); Sunday after June 5 (Obaneo)	Children tug of war with a rope made of sweet flag, Japanese mugwort and Japanese torreya. This is one of the five seasonal festivals (gosekku).	Iwami and Tottori, Tottori	—
Misasa tug of war (三朝のジンショ, Misasa no jinsho)	May 3 and 4	Tug of war between the western and eastern parts of the district using a more than 80 m (260 ft), 4 t (3.9 long tons; 4.4 short tons) rope. A win of the east is said to be a good harvest, if the west wins business is going to prosper. This is one of the five seasonal festivals (gosekku).	Misasa, Tottori	A large rope like structure made of wooden stalks.
Namari Momote Festival (生里のモモテ, namari no momote)	Sunday closest to 1st day of 2nd month	Archery festival with origins in the early 10th century held in the precincts of Sanboko Shrine, in order to pray for an abundant harvest, bountiful fishing and to keep evil away.	Namari, Takuma, Mitoyo, Kagawa	—
Yobuko tug of war (呼子の大綱引き, yobuko no ōtsunahiki)	first Saturday in June and the following Sunday	Tug of war between a "hill" and "beach" team using a 400 m (1,300 ft) long and 15 cm (5.9 in) wide rope. If the beach team wins it is said to be bountiful fishing in this year, if the hill team wins, the year is said to produce abundant crops.	Yobuko, Karatsu, Saga	—
Sendai tug of war (川内大綱引, sendai ōtsunahiki)	the day before the September equinox	Tug of war with a 365 metres long, 40 centimetre diameter, 7 tons rope that is preceded by the weaving of the rope by all the residents.	Satsumasendai, Kagoshima	—

==== Social life (knowledge of folk customs) ====
2 designations, all under criterion 1

Name	Date	Remarks	Location
Ochakō of Jōshū Shirokubo (上州白久保のお茶講, Jōshū-shirakubo no ochakō)	February 24	Tea guessing event, where local residents welcome the gods, drink tea together, read the tea and predict the bounty in their lives.	Nakanojō, Gunma
Omokō and Dōtoshiki of Ao (粟生のおも講と堂徒式, Ao no omokō to dōtoshiki)	8th day of first month	A ceremony held at the Yakushi Hall of Kichijō-ji involving the recitation of the Heart Sutra (known as Omokō) and the Dōtoshiki protocol permitting three-year-old children to the village.	Ao, Shimizu, Aridagawa, Wakayama

==== Annual functions or events ====
34 designations, all under criterion 1

Name	Date	Remarks	Location	Image
Yoshihama Suneka (吉浜のスネカ, Yoshihama no suneka)	January 15	A person called "Suneka", representing a kami and dressed in a strange mask and a straw raincoat, visits each house in a given district to punish lazy or crying children; related to the Namahage tradition of Akita Prefecture; handed down in Yoshihama district, Sanriku, Ōfunato, Iwate. Type: Visiting kami	Ōfunato, Iwate	—
Tsukihama Enzu-no-wari (月浜のえんずのわり, Tsukihama no Enzu-no-wari)	January 11–16	Bird chasing procession (tori-oi) involving children; traditionally a festival to pray for abundant harvest and good health; handed down in Tsukihama district, Miyato, Higashimatsushima, Miyagi. Type: Harvest/fertility	Higashimatsushima, Miyagi	—
Yonekawa Mizukaburi (ablution) (米川の水かぶり, Yonekawa no mizukaburi)	February 12	Event to ward off fire; young men and men of a critical age (yakudoshi, 42 years of age) dress in straw raincoats and headdresses their faces painted with soot; after a shrine visit they return to town and throw water on the houses; home owners try to extract from the participants' costumes straws which are then considered charms against fire. Type: Protection	Tome, Miyagi	—
Kamigō no koshōgatsu gyōji (上郷の小正月行事)	January 15	"Little New Year" (koshōgatsu) event celebrated by children involving the burning of a hut of Sae-no-kami and a bird chasing procession (tori-oi) with singing.	Nikaho, Akita	—
Namahage on Oga Peninsula (男鹿のナマハゲ, Oga no Namahage)	December 31–January 16	Young men dressed in traditional straw garments and wearing large masks representing the Namahage deity visit houses of new community members urging them to work and study hard; after receiving sake and mochi they leave blessing the house. Type: Visiting kami	Oga, Akita	
Rokugō Kamakura (六郷のカマクラ行事, Rokugō no Kamakura gyōji)	February 11–15	Events welcoming toshigami, deities of the year, and praying for an abundant harvest and health. The festival includes the decoration of large bamboo poles, the construction of snow huts, and a battle with bamboo poles.	Misato, Akita	
"Little New Year" event of Yuza (遊佐の小正月行事, Yuza no koshōgatsu gyōji)	1, 3 and 6 (Note: Each day in another district of the town)	A person called "Amahage", representing a kami dressed in a straw coat and covered with a red or blue ogre mask visits each family distributing mochi; also includes a tori-oi bird chasing event with drums and singing; the straw coats are burned together with kadomatsu and shimenawa in an event known as Honte-yaki (Honte burning). Type: Visiting kami	Yuza, Yamagata	—
Sai-no-kami of Mishima (三島のサイノカミ, Mishima no Sai-no-kami)	ca. January 15	Fire festival praying for abundant harvest, sound health and escape from evil; an artificial structure (Sai-no-kami) made of a sacred tree and new year's decoration is burned	Mishima, Fukushima	—
108 lights of Inomata (猪俣の百八燈, Inomata no hyakuhattō)	August 15	Construction of 108 mounds (Note: Mounds are constructed every year which is special for 108 lights festivals) and lighting of as many lights; said to originate in a ritual to console the spirits of Inomata Koheirokunoritsuna. Type: Bon Festival	Misato, Saitama	
Mito floating of sacred boats (三戸のオショロ流し, mito no oshoro nagashi)	August 16	Bon Festival event in which the spirits of the deceased are sent off by constructing a 5 m (16 ft) decorated straw ship and having children swim it out to the sea.	Mito, Hassemachi, Miura, Kanagawa	—
Ōiso Sagichō (大磯の左義長, ōiso no sagichō)	Third Saturday of January	New Year fire festival in which nine large decorated temporary shelters in the form of bonfires on the beach are set on fire. Dango are grilled in the fire and the event also includes a tug-of war.	Ōiso, Kanagawa	Large bonfire like structure on the beach.
Ōmi tug-of-war with bamboo (青海の竹のからかい, ōmi no take no karakai)	January 15	New Year Event in which two groups of mostly men in kumadori make-up fight using two 13–14 m (43–46 ft) long bamboo poles. The fights are followed by the burning of New Year decorations, praying for good health, abundant crops and a good haul.	Ōmi, Itoigawa, Niigata	—
Muramachi New Year Deity Send Off (邑町のサイノカミ, muramachi no sai no kami)	Sunday before January 15 (or January 15 if it is a Sunday)	New Year fire festival praying for health, an abundant harvest and ceremonial cleansing. Children go from house to house singing the Sai no kami song, carrying wooden male and female dolls and collecting New Year decorations that are later burned on a bonfire.	Nyūzen, Toyama	—
Noto's Amamehagi (能登のアマメハギ, noto no amamehagi)	January 2 (Monzen), January 14 and 20 (Wajima), February 3 (Uchiura)	Visiting kami event similar to Mensama and Namahage in which masked figures wearing straw raincoats enter the house unannounced to purify it.	Noto and Wajima, Ishikawa	—
Nozawa Onsen Dōsojin Fire Festival (野沢温泉の道祖神祭り, nozawa onsen no dōsojin matsuri)	January 15	New Year fire festival in which a large wooden shrine (shaden) is endowed with a dōsojin and set on fire by an offensive team, while men of "unlucky age" (25 and 42 years old) sitting on top of the shaden are trying to stop them. The event is seen as a celebration of birth of the first child, to dispel evil spirits and as a prayer for a happy marriage.	Nozawa Onsen, Nagano	Burning structure at night.
Toba Fire Festival (鳥羽の火祭り, toba no hi matsuri)	2nd Sunday in February	New Year event in which two giant (5 m (16 ft), 2 t (2.0 long tons; 2.2 short tons)) torches made of Japanese pampas grass (kaya) and known as suzumi are lit. Men compete to take out holy tress (shingi) that have been placed in the suzumi and to offer them at a shrine. The outcome is used to predict the year's weather and harvest.	Nishio, Aichi	Burning tree shaped structure at night.
Shimakamogogō Bon Festival event (志摩加茂五郷の盆祭行事, shimakamogogō no bon matsuri gyōji)	August 14–15	A nenbutsu odori dance followed by the raising of a 13 m (43 ft) tall fire torch accompanied by the sound of large bronze bells and large barrel-shaped drums. It is performed in order to console the spirits of the deceased and in to drive away evil spirits.	Toba, Mie	—
Tōkōji Onie (東光寺の鬼会, tōkōji no onie)	January 8	Demon ritual dance of two ogres, a red and a blue one, carry torches and halberds perform a dance in the temple grounds as a prayer for abundant harvest and purification ritual. The event also includes a theatrical display of rice planting.	Tōkō-ji, Kamimanganji, Kasai, Hyōgo	—
Otsuna of Etsutsumi and Ōnishi (江包・大西の御綱, etsutsumi ōnishi no otsuna)	February 11	A women's rope from Ichikishima Shrine, Ōnishi meats a male rope at Susanoo Shrine, Etsutsumi where the two ropes are joined, hung on a tree and ceremonies commence. The event also includes a mud wrestling competition and features a prayer for abundant harvest and child-giving.	Etsutsumi and Ōnishi, Sakurai, Nara	—
Dadadō Onihashiri (陀々堂の鬼はしり, dadadō no onihashiri)	January 14	New Year fire festival in which three ogres (father, mother, child) carrying giant lit torches run around the hall getting rid of evil and bringing good luck.	Dadadō, Nenbutsu-ji, Gojō, Nara	Masked figure with fire
Tondō festival at Sakenotsu (酒津のトンドウ, sakenotsu no tondō)	Weekend closest to January 15	Japanese New Year event in which a large, cone-shaped structure is constructed on the beach out of straw and bamboo and later burnt as a prayer for health and a good catch. The event also includes a ritual purification of the houses performed by young boys.	Sakenotsu, Ketaka, Tottori, Tottori	—
Isodake Guro (五十猛のグロ, isodake no guro)	January 11–15	New Year event in which a 10 m (33 ft) diameter temporary house is built of bamboo to greet Toshitokujin (歳徳神) the kami of the year (toshigami). The event is seen as a prayer for health and a good catch and the temporary structure is eventually burnt together with the New Year's decorations.	Isodake, Ōda, Shimane	—
Atsuki Shinmei Festival (阿月の神明祭, atsuki no shinmei matsuri)	February 11	New Year fire festival in which youth erect two 20 m (66 ft) tall shinmei, objects of worship decorated with gohei and daidai, on the beach. Various rituals and dances are performed at these shinmei, which are eventually burned. The event is seen as a prayer for a godo harvest and the protection from disaster and diseases.	Atsuki, Yanai, Yamaguchi	—
Suōsō Hashiramatsu (周防祖生の柱松行事, suōsō no hashiramatsu gyōji)	August 15 (Soo Nakamura), 19 (Soo Yamada), 23 (Soo Ochiai)	Construction and lighting of 20 m (66 ft) tall pillar torches (hashiramatsu). The event originates from a ritual to comfort the spirit and remove disaster when horses and cows were affected by a contagious disease.	Soo, Shūtō, Iwakuni, Yamaguchi	—
Jifuku Toitoi (地福のトイトイ, jifuku no toitoi)	January 14	New Year event in which children visit houses, place a straw horse in a bowl in front of the entrance, call out "toitoi" and hide. The family of the house exchange the straw horse for a bag of mochi and sweets which is then picked up by the children. The event is seen as a prayer for in-home safety and disease-free life.	Jifuku, Atō, Yamaguchi, Yamaguchi	—
Oni-yo Fire Festival of Daizenji Tamatare Shrine (大善寺玉垂宮の鬼夜, daizenji tamataregū no oniyo)	January 7	New Year fire festival in which a "devil fire" (oniyo) that has been guarded for seven days is transferred to six 13 m (43 ft) long torches which are carried around the shrine grounds by men in loinclothes. It is a ritual to drive away evil spirits.	Daizen-ji, Kurume, Fukuoka	
Mishima Kasedori (見島のカセドリ, mishima no kasedori)	2nd Saturday in February	Lunar New Year event and a form of "visiting gods" (raihoshin) in which unmarried men dressed in straw raincoats and bamboo hats represent deities bringing blessings to each home.	Hasuike-machi, Saga, Saga	Two men in straw coats bowing on a tatami floor inside a house.
Hetomato of Shimozakiyama (下崎山のヘトマト行事, shimozakiyama no hetomato gyōji)	Third Sunday in January	New Year event praying for an abundant harvest, a good catch and disaster relief. It includes various rituals such as sumo, hanetsuki, tamaseseri, (Note: In tamaseseri men dressed in loinclothes scramble for straw balls.) a tug of war and the carrying of a giant, 3 m (9.8 ft), 358 kg (789 lb) straw sandal.	Shimozakiyama, Gotō, Nagasaki	—
Koshikijima Toshidon (甑島のトシドン, koshikijima no toshidon)	December 31	Visiting deity (raihoshin) event at New Year's Eve in which two to five men representing the deity toshidon dress in straw raincoats decorated with leaves and masks with long pointed noses and demonic horns. Visiting the houses they scold the children and preach good behaviour. At the end they place a large rice cake on the children's back who carry it in this way to their parents. The ritual has been inscribed on the UNESCO Representative List of the Intangible Cultural Heritage of Humanity.	Koshikijima Islands, Satsumasendai, Kagoshima	—
Akina Arasetsu (秋名のアラセツ行事, akina no arasetsu gyōji)	1st day of hei of 8th month	An event welcoming Inadama, the spirit of rice, and thanking for this year's good harvest and praying for next year's harvest. The ritual involves singing and dancing and the shochogama ceremony in which men and children sit on the roof of a temporary shed, singing songs, playing drums and eventually breaking the shed and dancing on its remains.	Akina, Tatsugō, Kagoshima	—
Jugoya of Minamisatsuma (南薩摩の十五夜行事, minamisatsuma no jūgoya gyōji)	15th day of 8th month	Full moon event centered around a group of boys, including the making of a more than 100 m (330 ft) long rope, sumo, a tug-of-war and dancing.	Bonotsu, Chiran and Makurazaki; southern part of Satsuma Peninsula, Kagoshima	—
Akusekijima Boze (悪石島のボゼ, akusekijima no boze)	16th day of 7th month	Three men dress in giant headdress masks and palm leaves representing the Boze deity who cleanses people of evil. Appearing during the Bon dance, the Boze chase onlookers with a phallic cane to which red mud is attached.	Akusekijima, Kagoshima	—
Satsuma Iōjima Mendon (薩摩硫黄島のメンドン, satsuma iōjima no mendon)	1st and 2nd day of 8th month	Mendon, a deity thought to cleanse people of evil appears during the Hassaku drum dance (八朔太鼓踊り) interfering with the dancers and doing other mischiefs. The god is represented by men in straw coats wearing large grotesque red and black masks.	Satsuma Iōjima, Mishima, Kagoshima	—
Miyakojima Paantu Festival (宮古島のパーントゥ, miyakojima no pāntō)	First third of the 9th month (Shimajiri), last day of the ox in 12th month (Nobara)	Men dress up as a masked grass clad supernatural being (paantu) spreading sacred mud and cleansing the village of calamities.	Miyakojima, Okinawa	

==== Religious festivals and beliefs ====
75 designations. All were designated under Criteria 1. This includes all but one (Note: The Chiryū Festival, which is part of the UNESCO designated Yama, Hoko, Yatai, float festivals in Japan, has been designated as Important Intangible Folk Cultural Property in the category of Folk performing arts – Entertainment from Abroad and Performance Arts.) of the 33 festivals in the UNESCO Intangible cultural heritage Yama, Hoko, Yatai, float festivals in Japan. (Note: The float festivals included in this designation are: Hachinohe Sansha Taisai, Kakunodate Matsuri, Tsuchizaki Shinmeishasai, Hanawa Matsuri, Shinjō Matsuri, Hitachi Furyumono, Karasuyama Yamaage Festival, Kanuma Imamiya Festival, Chichibu Festival, Kawagoe Hikawa Festival, Sawara Festival, Takaoka Mikuruma-yama Festival, Uozu Tatemon Festival, Jōhana Shinmei Shrine Festival, Seihaku Festival, Takayama Festival, Furukawa Festival, Ōgaki Festival, Owari Tsushima Tennō Festival, Chiryū Festival, Inuyama Festival, Kamezaki Shiohi Festival, Sunari Festival, Toride Shrine Festival, Ueno Tenjin Festival, Ishidori Matsuri, Nagahama Hikiyama Festival, Gion Matsuri, Hakata Gion Yamakasa, Tobata Gion Yamagasa festival, Karatsu Kunchi, Yatsushiro Myoken Festival, Hita Gion Festival.)

Name	Date	Remarks	Location	Image
Pilgrimage to Mount Iwaki (岩木山の登拝行事, iwakisan no tohai gyōji)	End of the 7th month – 15th day of 8th month	Collective climbing of Mount Iwaki by local people praying for safety and in gratitude of the harvest.	Hirosaki, Aomori	
Hirosaki Neputa (弘前のねぷた, hirosaki no neputa)	August 1–7	Parade of fan-shaped paper nebuta floats decorated with historical or legendary figures and accompanied by flutes and taiko.	Hirosaki, Aomori	
Aomori Nebuta (青森のねぶた, aomori no nebuta)}	August 2–7	Parade of nebuta floats decorated with historical or legendary figures and accompanied by flutes, taiko drums and Obon dances. The festival is said to commemorate Sakanoue no Tamuramaro and together with the Akita Kantō and the Sendai Tanabata festival, it is one of the three great festivals in Tohoku.	Aomori, Aomori	
Floats of the Hachinohe Sansha Taisai (八戸三社大祭の山車行事, hachinohe sansha taisai no dashi gyōji)	August 1–3	Festival of three shrines: Ogami (霊神社), Shinra (新羅神社), and Shinmei (神明宮), with a procession of 27 floats and mikoshi accompanied by lion dances, masked warriors and people in traditional garb representing legendary or mythical characters.	Hachinohe, Aomori	
Murone Jinja festival Matsuriba rites (室根神社祭のマツリバ行事)	17th–19th day of the 9th month	Parishioners of 7 towns and villages carry mikoshi from the shrine and place them on a scaffolding structure at a temporary shrine where various dances are performed.	Ichinoseki, Iwate	—
Floats of the Hanawa Matsuri (花輪祭の屋台行事, hanawa matsuri no yatai gyōji)	August 19, 20	Joined event of Saiwaiinari Shrine (幸稲荷神社) and Hanawa Shinmeisha shrine (花輪神明社) in which 10 festival floats are paraded through town accompanied by music.	Hanawa, Kazuno, Akita	A festival float cart with taiko drummers lit up at night
Floats of the Kakunodate Matsuri (角館祭りのやま行事, kakunodate matsuri no yama gyōji)	September 7–9	Procession of floats with kabuki styled dolls, hayashi music and dance at a festival with origins in the 17th century.	Kakunodate, Akita	
Akita Kantō (秋田の竿灯, akita no kantō)	August 5–7	Parade of more than 200 long bamboo poles (kantō) carrying 46 paper lanterns each. Together with the Aomori Nebuta and the Sendai Tanabata festival, one of the three great festivals in Tohoku.	Akita, Akita	
Floats of Tsuchizaki Shinmeishasai (土崎神明社祭の曳山行事, tsuchizaki shinmeisha-sai no hikiyama gyōji)	July 20–21	Parade of mikoshi and 20 festival floats with almost life-sized dolls representing characters or scenes of historical narratives. The floats are provided by the neighborhoods.	Akita, Akita	
The ritual of the tōnin (東湖八坂神社のトウニン（統人）行事, tōkoyasaka jinja tōnin gyōji)|	Various dates (Jan 6, March 24–25, June 20, 24–28, July 1–8, December 7) with the main event on July 7	Apart from a parade of floats the festival is particularly noted for ushinori where a man dressed as Susanoo-no-Mikoto rides a cow through the streets and for kumo mai (spider dance) in which a man dressed in red does somersaults on a platform on a fishing boat in the harbor.	Katagami, Akita	—
Shōreisai Festival Ōtaimatsu event (松例祭の大松明行事, shōreisai no ōtaimatsu gyōji)	December 31 and January 1	New Year fire festival in which large torches (ōtaimatsu) are lit and the state of burning is said to predict the year's harvest and catch.	Dewa Sanzan, Tsuruoka, Yamagata	—
Floats of the Shinjō Matsuri (新庄まつりの山車行事, shinjō matsuri no yatai gyōji)	August 24–26	Festival initiated in 1756 during the Great famine of the Hōreki era by Tozawa Masanobu, head of the Shinjō Domain in order to raise the spirits of the people and to pray for abundant harvest. The floats from each of 21 towns are characterised by their gaudy decorations and life size figures. The parade is accompanied by flutes, cymbals, drums and shamisen music.	Shinjō, Yamagata	Lit up large model of a snake
Kanazawa Hayama Gomori (金沢の羽山ごもり, kanazawa no hayama gomori)	16th–18th day of the 11th month	Event related to Hayama no Kami in which after purification, local men climb Hayama where they receive the kami's oracle.	Fukushima, Fukushima	—
Tajima Gion Festival Otōya ritual (田島祇園祭のおとうや行事, tajima gion matsuri no otōya gyōji)	July 18–21	Festival held to drive away disease-inducing spirits. The festival includes various events such as a procession of young brides accompanied by hayashi, children's kabuki on four floats, daidai kagura and the carrying of mikoshi.	Minamiaizu, Fukushima	Procession of young women clad in kimono
Hitachi-Ōtsu Ofune (boat) festival (常陸大津の御船祭, hitachi ōtsu no ofune matsuri)	May 2–3, every 5 years (Note: The festival was last held in 2017.)	Spring festival of Sawawachigi Shrine in which a mikoshi is placed on a real fishing boat (dimensions: 14 m × 2.6 m × 3.8 m (45.9 ft × 8.5 ft × 12.5 ft) and 7 t (6.9 long tons; 7.7 short tons)) and paraded through town by 300 men, praying for a good catch and maritime safety.	Kitaibaraki, Ibaraki	—
Hitachi Float Procession (日立風流物, hitachi furyū-mono)	May 3–5	The grand festival of Kamine Shrine in which four community create floats that serve as multi-level puppet theatre for karakuri puppets. Its floats have been designated as Important Tangible Folk Cultural Property.	Minamiaizu, Ibaraki	Tall colorful structure with multiple levels for dolls.
Karasuyama Yamaage Festival (烏山の山あげ行事, karasuyama no yamaage gyōji)	Friday, Saturday and Sunday around fourth Saturday in July	Dating back to 1560 when the daimyō of Shimotsuke Province enshrined Gozu-Tennō in Yakumo Shrine to stem a disease. The festival is characterised by a display of festival floats (yatai), and various entertainments such as sumo, shishi kagura, and most notably outdoor performances of kabuki and dances of young girls. These are performed at various stages along the road when some of the stages include a mountain theme, giving rise to the name of the festival: ageyama meaning literally 'raised mountain'.	Nasukarasuyama, Tochigi	
Floats of Kanuma Imamiya Shrine (鹿沼今宮神社祭の屋台行事, kanuma imamiya jinja-sai no yatai gyōji)	Second weekend in October	Procession of 20 yatai festival floats accompanied by music and dance.	Kanuma, Tochigi	Decorated float with festival participants.
Hokkōji rice eating ceremony (発光路の強飯式, Hokkōji no gōhanshiki)	January 3	Compulsory rice eating as part of the Hokkōji Myōken Shrine festival.	Kanuma, Tochigi	—
Katashina Monkey Chasing Festival (片品の猿追い祭, katashina no saruoi matsuri)	Day of the monkey in the 9th month	Hotaka Shrine festival with a 300-year history going back to a story involving an evil white monkey that was defended by the village.	Hanasaku, Katashina, Gunma	—
Floats of Kawagoe Hikawa Festival (川越氷川祭の山車行事, kawagoe hikawa matsuri no dashi gyōji)	Third weekend in October	Festival of Kawagoe Hikawa Shrine featuring a festival float parade, dances, music, and as the main event a musical battle (hikkawase) between the floats.	Kawagoe, Saitama	
Music and Floats of the Chichibu Festival (秩父祭の屋台行事と神楽, chichibu matsuri no yatai gyōji to kagura)	December 2–3	Main festival of Chichibu Shrine with six carved floats, kagura dance and music.	Chichibu, Saitama	
Floats of Sawara (佐原の山車行事, sawara no dashi gyōji)	Friday, Saturday and Sunday following July 10 (Gion Festival); Friday, Saturday and Sunday around the second Saturday in October (Shinjuku Suwa Shrine Festival)	300 year old festival featuring floats decorated with 4 m (13 ft) tall dolls. There are ten dashi floats during the Gion Festival of Yasaka Shrine and 14 dashi at the autumn festival of Suwa Shrine.	Katori, Chiba	
Shiramazu Grand Festival (白間津のオオマチ（大祭）行事, shiramazu no ōmachi gyōji)	Fourth Friday, Saturday and Sunday in July, once every 4 years	Festival incorporating a variety of rituals and performances including a procession with a red-masked demon, drums, flutes, girls with wooden staffs, mikoshi, and men carrying decorated sake barrels. A highlight of the festival is the sasara dance consisting of 12 pieces performed by young girls in yukata and colorful hats. This includes dances of two girls representing sun and moon respectively or dances in which the youths prepare the path for the descent of the kami.	Minamibōsō, Chiba	—
Mona village taro Festival (茂名の里芋祭, mona no satoimo matsuri)	February 19–21	Festival of the twelve shrines in Mona that includes the offering of taro.	Tateyama, Chiba	—
Kibune Shrine Boat Festival (貴船神社の船祭り, kibune jinja no funa matsuri)	July 27–28	Boats decorated in flowers make their way out to sea accompanied by boat songs. Also included in the festival is a rowing boat race and Kashima odori dance.	Manazuru, Kanagawa	Boat decorated with colorful flowers.
Hadaka Festival of Uchisa Bishomon Hall (浦佐毘沙門堂の裸押合, uchisa bishamondō no hadaka oshiai)	March 3	"Naked" festival of men struggling for rice cakes, sake and other auspicious objects. The event is seen as a prayer for safety and abundant crops but also constitutes rite of passage to adulthood.	Fukō-ji, Uchisa, Minamiuonuma, Niigata	—
Floats of the Murakami Festival (村上祭の屋台行事, murakami matsuri no yatai gyōji)	July 6, 7	Grand Festival of Senami Haguro Shrine with a procession of 19 yatai floats, 14 horses and 4 kasaboko parade floats around the site of the former Murakami Castle. The yatai floats are two-storied with musicians on the lower and dolls on the upper level.	Senami Haguro Shrine, Murakami, Niigata	A two-level cart with large wheels and people in festival dress.
Sanpoku Botamochi Festival (山北のボタモチ祭り, sanpoku no botamochi matsuri)	December 2 (Nakahama and Sugitaira), January 12 (Ganjiki)	Event in which people prepare botamochi sweets for the tutelary kami as gratitude for a successful harvest and fishing.	Murakami, Niigata	—
Namerikawa Nebuta Nagashi (滑川のネブタ流し, namerikawa no nebuta nagashi)	July 31	Large burning torches on rafts called nebuta are sent out to sea symbolizing the sending away of drowsiness and filth and praying for a healthy year without disease.	Namerikawa, Toyama	—
Uozu Tatemon Festival (魚津のタテモン行事, uozu no tatemon gyōji)	First Friday and Saturday in August (Note: Until 2006 the festival had been held on August 7, 8.)	Parade of large, 16 m (52 ft) tall, 10 m (33 ft) long, triangular shaped floats decorated with about 90 lanterns each, praying for a good catch and safety at sea.	Uozu, Toyama	
Takaoka Float Procession (高岡御車山祭の御車山行事, takaoka mikuruma yama matsuri no mikuruma yama gyōji)	May 1	Float parade with seven dashi floats known locally as mikuruma yama (lit. 'cart mountains') decorated on top by sculptures of mythical animals from where umbrella like structures cover large kabuki-like figures.	Takaoka, Toyama	Colorful float with figure on top.
Floats of Jōhana Shinmei Shrine (城端神明宮祭の曳山行事, jōhana shinmei-gū sai no hikiyama gyōji)	May 4–5	Parade of six hikiyama floats with large sculptures of Japanese deities such as Ebisu or Daikokuten, accompanied by lion dances, music, mikoshi and men carrying halberds. Peculiar to the festival are long-based carts known as ioriyatai pulled in front of the hikiyama and housing two groups of musicians: flute and shamisen players on one side and vocalists on the other.	Nanto, Toyama	—
hōjōtsu hachimangūsai no hikiyama tsukiyama gyōji (放生津八幡宮祭の曳山・築山行事)	September 30–October 2		Imizu, Toyama	—
Keta Cormorant Festival customs (気多の鵜祭の習俗, keta no u matsuri no shūzoku)	December 16	A cormorant is released to the gods and based on its movement the year's harvest and weather is forecast.	Keta Taisha Hakui, Ishikawa	—
Wakabata Procession of the Kumakabuto Festival (熊甲二十日祭の枠旗行事, kumakabuto hatsuka-sai wakubata gyōji)	September 20	Parade of mikoshi and tall red banners accompanied by bells and drums and led by the masked dancing deity Sarudahiko no mikoto. It is a joyous expression of thanks for abundant harvest and fishing.	Nanao, Ishikawa	—
Floats of the Seihaku Festival (青柏祭の曳山行事, seihaku-sai no hikiyama gyōji)	May 13–15	Festival of Ōtokonushi Shrine with huge 12 m (39 ft) tall hikiyama floats decorated with large kabuki-style dolls, and large barrel-shaped drums in an event meant to drive away disease-bearing spirits and to secure the safety of the local people.	Nanao, Ishikawa	
Yoshida Fire Festival (吉田の火祭, yoshida no hi matsuri)	August 26–27	Fire festival in which huge lit and paraded through town announcing the close of the climbing season on Mount Fuji.	Fujiyoshida, Yamanashi	
Kosuge Hashiramatsu Festival (小菅の柱松行事, kosuge no hashiramatsu gyōji)	Weekend following July 14, every 3 years (Note: The last time the festival was held in 2016.)	Shinto event in which two children on two 4 m (13 ft) tall structures made of branches compete to strike a light with a piece of flint.	Kosuge Shrine, Iiyama, Nagano	—
Floats and Drums of Furukawa Festival (古川祭の起し太鼓・屋台行事, furukawa matsuri no okoshi daiko yatai gyōji)	April 19–20	A parade of priests, dignitaries, mikoshi, flag carrying men and lion dancers is followed by a procession of yatai floats and hayashi music in the evening of the first day. The highlight of the festival is the okoshi taiko, when giant drums supported by wooden stand are brought out on the second day.	Ketawaka Miya Shrine, Hida, Gifu	
Floats of the Takayama Festival (高山祭の屋台行事, takayama matsuri no yatai gyōji)	April 14–15 (Spring festival of the Hie Shrine), October 9–10 (Autumn festival of the Sakurayama Hachiman Shrine)	Float festivals with 12 (11) decorated yatai floats, three (four) with karakuri mechanical dolls representing characters from Japanese myths or legends during the spring (autumn) festival. The procession is accompanied by lion dances, daidai kagura and music.	Takayama, Gifu	
Ōgaki Festival Yama Floats Procession (大垣祭の軕行事, ōgaki matsuri no yama gyōji)	Weekend before May 15	Parade of 13 yama floats decorated with dolls and karakuri mechanical puppets. The festival shows features of festival culture from eastern (Chūkyō) and western (Kinki) Japan.	Ōgaki, Gifu	Festival float with attached small roofed stage and dolls
Mitsuke Tenjin Hadaka Matsuri (見付天神裸祭, mitsuke tenjin hadaka matsuri)	Weekend preceding the 10th day of the 8th month	Naked festival involving purification of the participants on the beach, miko kagura dances, oni mai (demon dances) and as the highlight, the violent carrying of mikoshi.	Mitsuke, Iwata, Shizuoka	—
Boat Procession of Ōe Hachiman Shrine (大江八幡神社の御船行事, ōe hachiman jinja no ofune gyōji)	Mid-September	Youths manipulate model boats while singing and chanting.	Sagara, Makinohara, Shizuoka	—
Floats of Kamezaki Shiohi Festival (亀崎潮干祭の山車行事, kamezaki shiohi matsuri no dashi gyōji)	May 3–4	Shio-hi (low tide) festival of Kamezaki in which five tall two-tiered dashi floats with distinct roofs are dragged to the beach with puppet plays performed on the upper storey to the accompaniment of Noh and nagauta songs.	Kamisaki Shrine, Kamezaki, Handa, Aichi	
Floats of the Inuyama Festival (犬山祭の車山行事, Inuyama matsuri no yama gyōji)	First Saturday and following Sunday of April	Display of 13 three-storied dashi floats known locally as yama (車山) and produced by 13 towns. During the day hayashi music from the lowest floor accompanies theatrical puppet performances on the top level. Afterwards 365 lanterns (one for each day of the year) are attached to each float.	Inuyama, Aichi	
Sunari Festival (須成祭の車楽船行事と神葭流し, sunari matsuri no danjiri bune gyōji to miyoshi nagashi)	Early July to late October, festival eve on first Saturday in August	Also known as '100 day festival'. During the Yoi-matsuri eve in August, boats decorated with paper lanterns are festooned in the river. In the morning of the following day, during the Asa-matsuri, these boats with Takasago dolls and festival music go up the river.	Tomiyoshi Tatehaya Shrine and Hakken-sha Shrine, Kanie, Aichi	
Boats of the Owari Tsushima Tennō Festival (尾張津島天王祭の車楽舟行事, owari tsushima tennō matsuri no danjiri-bune gyōji)	Fourth Saturday and following Sunday of July	Festivals involving six danjiri, boat versions of the terrestrial dashi floats, which are multi-tiered structures housing life-size dolls and depicting scenes from Noh drama. The highlight is a lit-up display of the boats on the Tennō river.	Tsushima, Aichi	
Oni Festival of Toyohashi Shinmei Shrine (豊橋神明社の鬼祭, toyohashi shinmei-sha no oni matsuri)	February 10–11	Ritual masked and unmasked dances including varieties of kagura and dengaku. The highlight is the rivalry between a red-masked demon (oni) and a long-nose-masked tengu. After the demon is defeated he runs through the village throwing sweets and white powder which is said to protect from summer diseases.	Toyohashi, Aichi	飽海神戸神明社の鬼祭り
Oni Festival of Takisan-ji (瀧山寺鬼祭り, takisan-ji oni matsuri)	Saturday following the 7th day of the first month	An Oni festival consisting of rice pounding and mock up rice planting followed by a fire festival praying for a rich harvest and peace.	Takisan-ji, Okazaki, Aichi	Oni Festival of Takisan-ji
Floats of the Kuwana Ishidori Festival (桑名石取祭の祭車行事, kuwana ishidori matsuri no saisha gyōji)	First Sunday of August and the preceding Saturday	Procession of around 30 saisha festival carts accompanied by ōdaiko and hayashi.	Kuwana, Mie	
Danjiri of the Ueno Tenjin Festival (上野天神祭のダンジリ行事, ueno tenjin matsuri no danjiri gyōji)	Sunday before October 25 and the preceding Friday and Saturday (Note: Until 2016 the festival had been held every year from October 23–25.)	Procession of danjiri, i.e. daishi or hikiyama style floats, accompanied by drums and bells. The festival was originally closely connected with the Tenjin festival in Osaka.	Iga, Mie	
Whaling Floats of Toride Shrine (鳥出神社の鯨船行事, toride jinja no kujira bune gyōji)	August 14–15	In an event seen as a prayer for abundant fishing, four gold decorated whale-boat-shaped dashi floats are pulled through town in pursuit of a mock whale.	Higashitomida-chō, Yokkaichi, Mie	Men manipulating a decorative model of a boat and a whale.
Floats of the Ōtsu Festival (大津祭の曳山行事, ōtsu matsuri no hikiyama gyōji)	Weekend before the second Monday in October	Parade of thirteen festival floats and mikoshi accompanied by music and chanting with participants wearing tanuki masks.	Tenson Shrine, Ōtsu, Shiga	—
Potato Contest of Ōmi Nakayama (近江中山の芋競べ祭り, Ōmi Nakayama no Imo-kurabe Matsuri)	September 1	Formal contest comparing the length of taro followed by climbing Nogamiyama.	Hino, Shiga	—
Mikami Zuiki Festival (三上のずいき祭, mikami no zuiki matsuri)	Mid-October	Autumn festival of Mikami Shrine as a gratitude for the harvest with portable shrines made of the zuiki plant.	Mikami Shrine, Yasua, Shiga	—
Floats of the Nagahama Hikiyama Festival (長浜曳山祭の曳山行事, nagahama hikiyama matsuri no hikiyama gyōji)	April 13–16	Display of hikiyama floats in which hayashi' music and children's kabuki are performed. The festival was initiated in the Tenshō era by Toyotomi Hideyoshi celebrating the birth of his son.	Nagahama, Shiga	—
Yamaboko Floats of the Kyoto Gion Matsuri (京都祇園祭の山鉾行事, kyōto gion matsuri no yamaboko gyōji)	July	Dashi float parade accompanied by hayashi music. The festival originates from a goryō-e ritual in 869 when 66 halberds were used to pacify disease causing spirits. From 960 the festival became an annual event only interrupted by times of war. The tall poles on top of the yamaboko floats symbolize these halberds.	Kyoto, Kyoto	
Miyaza of Wakide Shrine (涌出宮の宮座行事, wakide no miya no miyaza gyōji)	Various (February 15–17, March 21, September 30, October 16–17)	Religious rituals typical for communities of shrine parishioners (miyaza) such as various types of offerings, ritual rice planting (taue) and the lighting of large torches.	Kizugawa, Kyoto	—
Taima-dera Nerikuyo (當麻寺練供養, taima-dera nerikuyō)	14 April	Procession of 25 participants dressed as Bodhisattvas with golden masks reenacting the departure of Chūjō-hime to the Western Paradise.	Taima-dera, Katsuragi, Nara	—
Sakoshi boat festival (坂越の船祭, sakoshi no funa matsuri)	Second weekend in October	Large boat festival with a large fleet of wooden Japanese ships centered around boats carrying mikoshi and including rowing boats, lion boats, pleasure boats and boats for music and song.	Ōsake Shrine, Sakoshi, Akō, Hyōgo	
Boats of the Kōchi Festival (河内祭の御舟行事, kōchi matsuri no mifune gyōji)	Fourth weekend in July	Three elaborately decorated boats and barges including a lion dance barge slowly make up their way from Koza Shrine along the Koza River to Kōchi shrine, represented by Seisho island, where offerings are made.	Koza, Kushimoto, Wakayama	—
Omikokusan of Kure Hachimangū (久礼八幡宮の御神穀祭, kure hachimangū no omikokusan)	30th day of the 7th month – 16th day of 8th month	Autumn festival of Kure Hachiman Shrine in which a sacred marker (hōdō) is raised and a giant torch is lit.	Kure, Nakatosa, Kōchi	—
Yoshida parading of shrines (吉田祭のお練り行事, yoshida matsuri no neri gyōji)	November 3	Annual festival of the Hachiman Shrine including a parade of various performances such as samurai, lion heads, dolls and ushi-oni.	Yoshida, Uwajima, Ehime	—
Shingū Hayatama Festival Otō Fire Festival (新宮の速玉祭・御燈祭り, shingū no hayatama sai otō matsuri)	February 6–7	Festival of Kumano Hayatama Taisha in which about 2000 men in white clothes run down stairs torch in hand.	Shingū, Wakayama	—
Nachi Fire Festival (那智の扇祭り, nachi no ōgi matsuri)	July 13–14	12 vermillion mikoshi decorated with ōgi fans and mirrors and 12 huge 50 kg (110 lb) torches waved next to them.	Nachikatsuura, Wakayama	—
Tobata Gion Yamagasa festival (戸畑祇園大山笠行事, tobata gion ōyamagasa gyōji)	Fourth Friday, Saturday, Sunday in July	Parade of ōyamagasa floats that are decorated by flags during the day and turned into pyramids of light by a large number of lanterns at night.	Kitakyushu, Fukuoka	
Saidai-ji Eyō Nakedness Festival (西大寺の会陽, saidai-ji no eyō)	Third Saturday of February	About 9,000 naked men competing to get one of two sacred wooden sticks (shingi) dropped from a window of the temple. The shingi are said to make childbirth easier and to drive away evil spirits.	Saidai-ji, Okayama, Okayama	Half naked men.
Pine pole Festival of Tokakuji Temple (等覚寺の松会, tokakuji no matsue)	Third Sunday in April	Shugendō ritual where various events such as mikoshi carrying and lion dances are followed by ritual imitations of rice planting (taue), halberd dances and paper cutting, which are typical yamabushi performances. The highlight is the erection of a tall pine pole stand (matsu hashira) on which a yamabushi performs various acts. The festival is a prayer for abundant harvest and safety.	Hakusan Taga Shrine, Kanda, Fukuoka	—
Hakata Gion Yamakasa Festival (博多祇園山笠行事, hakata gion yamakasa gyōji)	July 1–15, with the peak of the festival between July 10–15	Festival of Kushida Shrine celebrating Susanoo-no-Mikoto through a parade of large dashi floats called yamakasa, variously decorated with dolls.	Fukuoka, Fukuoka	
Floats of the Karatsu Kunchi Festival (唐津くんちの曳山行事, karatsu kunchi no hikiyama gyōji)	November 2–4	Procession of 14 hikiyama floats in the shape of samurai helmets, sea bream, dragons and other fantastical creatures, the oldest, a red lion dates to 1819.	Karatsu, Saga	
Yatsushiro Myōken Shinkō Festival (八代妙見祭の神幸行事, yatsushiro myōken sai no shinkō gyōji)	November 22–23	Transfer of the shintai from Yatsushiro Shrine to Shioya Hachiman-gū (known as o-kudari) and exhibition of decorated floats and a mythical creature, half snake half turtle on the first day. On the second day the shintai returns (o-nobori) in a procession with lion dances.	Yatsushiro, Kumamoto	—
Floats of the Hita Gion Festival (日田祗園の曳山行事, hita gion no hikiyama gyōji)	Weekend following July 20	Float festival with 9 yama floats with a peculiar multi-layer doll structure.	Hita, Ōita	
Iwagawa Yagorō Doll Festival (八代妙見祭の神幸行事, iwagawa no yagorō ningyō gyōji)	November 3	Annual festival of Iwagawa Hachiman Shrine in which a giant doll called Yagorō is paraded at the head of a procession praying for a rich harvest.	Soo, Kagoshima	
Shioya Bay Ungami Sea Festival (塩屋湾のウンガミ, shioya-wa no ungami)	First day of gai following Obon	Various rituals followed by a boat race in an event that is seen as a prayer for abundant harvest and fishing.	Ōgimi, Okinawa	—

=== Folk performing arts ===
==== Kagura ====
kagura (神楽, lit. 'god entertainment') are dances associated with Shinto shrines.

There have been 43 designations, all under Criteria 1, unless otherwise indicated.

Name	Date	Remarks	Location	Image
Matsumae Kagura (松前神楽)	Various times	Originally performed at Matsumae Castle, chief residence of the Matsumae clan, the dance subsequently spread to other parts of Hokkaido where it picked up regional straits.	various parts of southeastern Hokkaido: Matsumae District, Hakodate, Otaru, Fukushima	—
Noh Dance of Shimokita (下北の能舞, shimokita no nōmai)	From third day of New Year	Theatrical yamabushi kagura consisting of ritual dances, military dances of battles between humans and demons and a lion dance. This is preceded by a group of local youths moving from house to house carrying a lion's head representing gongen.	Shimokita District, Aomori	—
Unotori Dance (鵜鳥神楽, unotori kagura)	Various times, from January 8 to April	Theatrical yamabushi kagura performed as a travelling tour through various villages and towns along the Sanriku Coast, from Kuji in the north to Kamaishi in the south. The dance has been designated under Criteria 2, 3.	Unotori Shrine, Fudai, Iwate	—
Kuromori Kagura (黒森神楽)	Third Sunday in July	Theatrical yamabushi kagura centered around gongen lion dances and also including ritual and masked dances. The dances are accompanied by small hourglass-shaped drums, flutes and bronze cymbals and distinct bird-style hats are used in some of them.	Kuromori Shrine, Miyako, Iwate	—
Hayachine Kagura (早池峰神楽)	July 31, August 1; also on February 2, latter part of April, middle of September, third Sunday in December (Ōtsuganai); January 3, December 17 (Take)	A variety of masked dance including ritual, theatrical and wild pieces, comic dialogue and at the end a lion dance characteristic of the yamabushi tradition of northeast Japan. The hayachine kagura is represented by two kagura groups, Ōtsuganai and Take, with more or less identical performances. The one notable difference is that the masked used for the mountain kami are referred to as a in Ōtsuganai and as un in the Take tradition, forming the a-un syllables that feature in various Buddhist and Shinto contexts.	Hayachine Shrine, Ōhasama, Hanamaki, Iwate	—
Ogatsu hōin Kagura (雄勝法印神楽)	18th day of the second month (Funatama Shrine); 15th–16th day of the third month (Isuzu Shrine); 19th day of the third month (Shirogane Shrine); 8th day of the fourth month, once every three or four years (Ishi Shrine); 29th day of the fourth month, once every three or four years (Shiogama Shrine)	Theatrical yamabushi kagura including the Amano-Iwato story which is characteristic of kagura of western Japan. It is accompanied by two large ōdaiko drums and is first mentioned in a document from 1739.	Ogatsu, Ishinomaki, Miyagi	—
Nekko Bangaku (根子番楽)	August 14, second Sunday in September	A form of yamabushi kagura performed as part of the Bon festival in August and as part of Yama Shrine's festival in September. Locally it is referred to as bushi mai ('warrior dance'), ara mai ('wild dance') or shishi mai ('lion dance') and is accompanied by large hourglass-type drum, flute and cymbals.	Yama Shrine, Ani, Kitaakita, Akita	—
Horōsan no Shimotsuki Kagura (保呂羽山の霜月神楽)	November 7, 8	A form of yudate kagura (Note: In the yudate kagura a cauldron is placed inside the sacred area to perform a ritual purification with boiling water (yudate). This form of dances are derived from those at the outer shrines of Ise Shrine and is known as Ise-ryū kagura. It is associated with festivals such as hana-matsuri, shimotsuki matsuri and fuyu matsuri.) including 33 rituals performed over one night including a kagura dance in ancient manner. It is seen as a prayer for abundant crops and thanks for the harvest.	Ōmori, Yokote, Akita	—
Honkai-bangaku Lion dance (本海獅子舞番楽, honkai shishimai bangaku)	Various times of the year, at the start of the year in January, July–September, November, December	Intense lion dance performed by two people, one carrying a lion head the other under a sheet. Besides the lion dance there are other ceremonial and ritual dances, samurai dances and women dances. The designation has been designated under Criteria 2, 3.	Akita Prefecture	—
Sugisawa Hiyama (杉沢比山)	August 15 (main), also on August 6 (preparation), 20 (sending kami off)	A type of yamabushi kagura that belongs to the bangaku kagura tradition of Aomori, Iwate, Akita and Yamagata Prefecture and consists of a series of masked dramas and ritual dances.	Kumano Shrine, Yuza, Yamagata	—
Tamashiki Shrine Kagura (玉敷神社神楽, tamashiki jinja kagura)			Kisai, Saitama	
Washinomiya Saibara Kagura (鷲宮催馬楽神楽)			Washimiya, Saitama	
Edo no Sato Kagura (江戸の里神楽) or haji kagura	Various times throughout the year	Theatrical mime performed by shrines around Tokyo consisting of four groups: Wakayama shachū (Taitō), Mamiya shachū (Shinagawa), Matsumoto shachū (Arakawa), and Yamamoto shachū (Inagi). The tradition is derived from the Washi no Miya Kagura of Saitama and was introduced during the Enpō era. It received a revamping during the Meiji period resulting in a mix of classical (koten) kagura relating ancient myths, modern (kindai) kagura portraying medieval stories (e.g. Rashōmon), otogi kagura of modern legends (e.g. Momotarō), Noh and kyōgen kagura.	Tokyo	—
Yutate Lion dance (箱根の湯立獅子舞, hakone no yutate shishimai)	July 15 (Miyagino), March 27 and May 5 (Sengokuhara)		Miyagino and Sengokuhara, Hakone, Kanagawa	—
Chigo no Mai of Kawaguchi (河口の稚児の舞, Kawaguchi no chigo no mai)	April 25 (Magomi Festival (孫見祭)) and July 28 (Daidai Festival (太々御神楽祭))	Dance of about 10 young girls accompanied by drums, hourglass-shaped drums, and flutes considered as a type of daidai kagura. The dance has been designated under Criteria 2, 3.	Kawaguchi Asama Shrine, Fujikawaguchiko, Yamanashi	—
Tōyama Shimotsuki Matsuri (遠山の霜月祭, tōyama no shimotsuki matsuri)	December 1–23	A form of yudate kagura consisting of various dances and dramas.	Iida, Nagano	Sculptures of a drummer and a person on a water outlet.
Tenryū Shimotsuki Kagura (天竜村の霜月神楽)			Tenryū, Nagano	
Yudate Kagura of Numata and Ōsaka (沼田・大坂の湯立神楽, numata ōsaka no yudate kagura)	The day before the last Sunday in October (Numata); first Sunday after July 26 (Ōsaka)		Numata and Ōsaka, Gotemba, Shizuoka	—
Hana Matsuri (花祭)			Kitashitara District, Aichi	
Ise Daikagura (伊勢太神楽)	December 24	A tradition of predominantly lion dances with some theatrical pieces and acrobatics added. They are used as purification ritual and to pacify spirits.	Kuwana, Mie	Men with large Chinese lion shaped dolls on their shoulders.
Okashira Shinji (御頭神事; lit. 'ritual of the (lions') heads')	February	Lion dance of a male and female lion by two men bearing torches, originally performed as purification ritual to cure the villagers of disease.	Ise, Mie	—
Sada Shin Noh (佐陀神能, sada shinnō)	September 24–25	Sacred Noh with dramatic pieces on the first day preceded by unmasked kagura known as shichi za ('seven seats'). The theatrical pieces portray myths from the Kojiki and Nihon shoki as well as local stories from Izumo Province.	Sada Shrine, Matsue, Shimane	—
Ōmoto Kagura (大元神楽)	November, once every four to seven years	Theatrical kagura of among others myths from the Kojiki and Nihon shoki. The climax is a spirit possession ritual in which a person in trance relates the words of the deity, specifically the nature of future crops and the future safety of the village. Ōmoto is a local deity with links to Kōjin. The oldest record of this kagura dates to 1615.	Sakurae, Shimane	—
Ōdochi Kagura (大土地神楽)	Saturday and Sunday nearest to November 24–25	Part of the Izumo kagura tradition, it consists of ritual dances and 12 dramatic pieces with the earliest records dating to 1754. Ōdaiko and kodaiko drums are used with the drumming of the latter thought to have been influenced by Noh via Sada Shrine.	Ōdochi Ara Shrine, Taisha, Izumo, Shimane	—
Bitchu Kagura (備中神楽)	Various times throughout the year	Predominantly theatrical kagura including sword dances that are possibly an influence by shugendō.	western part of Okayama Prefecture and extends into Hiroshima Prefecture	—
Hiba Kōjin Kagura (比婆荒神神楽)	Third Saturday in November	Theatrical kagura similar to Ōmoto Kagura performed for the Kōjin deity. Hiba Kōjin Kagura is noted for the dance of the deity Sarudahiko depicted through a grotesque long-nose mask and acrobatic movements. Rarely spirit possessions take place.	Nuka Shrine, Hiba District, Hiroshima, Shōbara, Hiroshima	—
Sacred dance of Yukaba Iwakuni (岩国行波の神舞, iwakuni yukaba no kanmai)	Second Saturday in October	This kanmai (a local name for kagura) consists of unmasked dances and theatrical pieces with the highlight a solo acrobatics on the top of an almost 30 m (98 ft) tall pine column and on a rope running from the top of the column to the roof of the place of kagura performances.	Aratama Shrine, Iwakuni, Yamaguchi	—
Mitsukuri Kagura (三作神楽)	21st–23rd day of the eleventh month, once every seven years	23 pieces of theatrical and ritual dances accompanied by ōdaiko and flute with the highlight being the sanpō kōjin no mai when a dancer climbs up a cloth rope attached to the ceiling. The oldest record of Mitsukuri Kagura in its present form is from 1764.	Kawachi Shrine, Mitsukuri, Shūnan, Yamaguchi	—
Iyo Kagura (伊予神楽)	March, April	Mix of ritual unmasked dances and theatrical pieces seen as purification ritual to drive away evil spirits and as thanksgiving for the harvest.	Uwajima, Ehime	—
Tosa Kagura (土佐の神楽, tosa no kagura)	November 22	Theatrical kagura consisting of unmasked dances and masked drama including the Amano-Iwato story, in which the sun goddess Amaterasu was drawn out of her place of hiding, and the dispute between the deities of the four seasons.	Ikegawa Shrine, Ikegawa, Kōchi	—
Northern foot of Mount Chōkai Lion dance (鳥海山北麓獅子舞番楽, chōkaisan hokuroku shishimai bangaku)			Yurihonjō and Nikaho, Kōchi	—
Buzen Kagura (豊前神楽)	Early September to May	Ritualistic purification kagura and pieces related to the myths of Izumo. While most pieces are in the Izumo style, the highlight is an Ise-style yudate kagura.	Buzen region, Fukuoka; Nakatsu and Usa, Ōita	—
Iki Kagura (壱岐神楽)	October 13–14	Theatrical kagura with a history of at least 600 years, preceded and interspersed by unmasked dances.	Iki Shrine, Iki, Nagasaki	—
Hirado Kagura (平戸神楽)	October 26	Ritual dances and theatrical kagura influenced by kagura from the west of Japan and created during the Genroku era by a vassal of daimyō Tenshōkō Shigenobu.	Kameoka Shrine, Hirado, Nagasaki	—
Gotō Kagura (五島神楽)	Various times	Rural kagura performed on a narrow space at various shrine festivals on the islands and accompanied by drums, flutes and occasionally bells. The earliest records of a naginata sword dance go back to the 17th century.	Gotō Islands, Nagasaki	—
Kuma Kagura (球磨神楽)	About two month starting on October 8	Unmasked dances with performers carrying bells, swords and other implements, performed at various shrines in Hitoyoshi and in Kuma District starting at Aoi Aso Shrine. The dance has been designated under Criteria 2, 3.	Kumamoto Prefecture	—
Ondake Kagura (御嶽神楽)			Bungo-ōno, Ōita	
Takaharu Kanme (高原の神舞, takaharu no kanme)	First weekend in December (Sano), second weekend in December (Haraigawa)	Kagura tradition handed down in two districts, Sano and Haraigawa, that are situated to the east of Mount Takachiho, which has been a center of local worship, resulting in the development of ritual kagura dances. Unmasked and masked dances are performed on a stage surrounded by three torii and next to three tall pillars. The dance has been designated under Criteria 2, 3.	Takaharu, Miyazaki	—
Takachiho Night Kagura (高千穂の夜神楽, takachiho no yokagura)	November to mid-January	A theatrical form of kagura taking place at the beginning of the year at specially prepared people's homes. The most significant piece performed in this context is the Amano-Iwato story, in which the sun goddess Amaterasu was drawn out of her place of hiding.	Takachiho, Miyazaki	—
Shiiba Kagura (椎葉神楽)			Shiiba, Miyazaki	
Mera Kagura (米良神楽)	December 14–15	Theatrical kagura starting at night and consisting of 33 ritual dances and masked dramas.	Shiromi Shrine, Saito, Miyazaki	—
Takanabe kagura (高鍋神楽, takanabe kagure)	December to February	Outdoor kagura performance.	Koyu District, Miyazaki	—
Morotsuka kagura (諸塚神楽, morotsuka kagure)	Late January to early February	Night kagura performance retaining syncretism of Buddhism and Shinto.	Koyu District, Miyazaki	—

==== Dengaku ====
dengaku (田楽, lit. 'field music') are musical presentations/dances related to rice planting.

There have been 26 designations, all under Criteria 1 unless otherwise indicated.

Name	Date	Remarks	Location	Image
Hachinohe Emburi (八戸のえんぶり, hachinohe no enburi)	February 17–19	Ritual rice planting dance as a prayer for abundant crops. Participants clutching an emburi (Note: An agricultural tool for scraping the surface of the soil.) and wearing large golden colored horse-shaped eboshi hats dance through the streets of the city.	Hachinohe, Aomori	Dark clad people wearing large golden colored hats.
Yamaya Taue Odori (山屋の田植踊, yamaya no taue odori)	15th day of the first month	Indoor theatrical presentation of farming as a prayer for abundant crops. Many of the pieces performed are comical in nature.	Shiwa, Iwate	—
Akiu Taue Odori (秋保の田植踊, akiu no taue odori)	April 28–29 Ōtaki Fudōdō, Baba; 15th day of fourth month Yakushidō, Yumoto; August 14–16 Nagabukuro shinmeisha shrine	Performances of a series of ta asobi displaying a variety of farming activities, the dances of young girls with decorated hats, and small boys shaking suzu bells. These events are seen as prayer for abundant crops and dedication to the kami of rice fields.	Akiu, Sendai, Miyagi	—
Gohōden Chigo Dengaku and Customs (御宝殿の稚児田楽・風流, gohōden no chigo dengaku furyū)	July 31 and August 1	Combination of children dengaku and furyū as part of the shrine's Kumano festival.	Kumano Shrine, Gohōden, Iwaki, Fukushima	—
Ishii Seven Lucky Gods and Taue Odori (石井の七福神と田植踊, ishii no shichifukujin to taue odori)	14th–15th day of the first month	Two distinct traditions: in the shichifukujin the seven lucky gods' appearance is followed by a comic duo imitating various farming activities and after this the ritual rice planting (taue odori) ensues. In it women wearing decorated hats imitate the stages of farming and visit houses in the village. The event is seen as a prayer for abundant crops and the raising of silkworms.	Nihonmatsu, Fukushima	—
Tsutsukowake Shrine Otaue (都々古別神社の御田植, tsutsukowake jinja no otaue)	6th day of the first month	Dramatic representation of various stages of rice planting.	Tsutsukowake Shrine, Tanagura, Fukushima	—
Itabashi Taasobi (板橋の田遊び, itabashi no taasobi)	February 11 (Tokumaru Shrine), February 13 (Akatsukasuwa Shrine)	Theatrical enactments of the rice planting process as a prayer for abundant crops.	Itabashi, Tokyo	—
Mizuumi Dengaku and Nōmai (水海の田楽・能舞, mizuumi no dengaku nōmai)	February 15	Dengaku with binzasara rattle accompaniment followed by Noh dance with typical drum assemblage.	Mizuumi Ukan Shrine, Ikeda, Fukui	
Rituals of the Mutsuki (January) (睦月神事, mutsuki shinji)	February 14, every four years	Various entertainments such as lion dances, dengaku by young children, and imitations of agricultural activities (ta asobi). The event is seen as prayer for peace and abundant harvest.	Fukui, Fukui	—
Gero Ta-no-Kami Festival (下呂の田の神祭, gero no ta no kami matsuri)	February 14	A lion dance followed by four dancers wearing hats decorated with red, yellow and white paper performing a flower umbrella (hana kasa) dance. At the end there series of performances imitating the stages of rice farming.	Gero, Gifu	—
Nishiure Dengaku (西浦の田楽, nishiure no dengaku)	18th–19th day of the second month	Dengaku and other rice field plays (ta asobi) followed by a number of masked dramas known as hane nō that retain contents from urban Noh.	Nishiure, Misakubo, Hamamatsu, Shizuoka	—
Fujimori Taasobi (藤守の田遊び, fujimori no taasobi)	March 17	Dramatic imitation of various stages of rice planting given by unmarried youths, with the highlight being the monkey dengaku (saru dengaku).	Ōi Hachiman-gū, Ōigawa, Yaizu, Shizuoka	—
Hirugaya Taasobi (蛭ヶ谷の田遊び)	February 11	As a prayer for abundant harvest, prosperity of the children, imitate the work done in rice cultivation in front of a large bonfire. The event is not accompanied by music, only dance and speech is used. This designation has been selected under Criteria 2, 3.	Hiruko Shrine, Makinohara, Shizuoka	—
Hattasan Taasobi (法多山の田遊び, hattasan no taasobi)	January 7	Kyōgen style theatrical enactments with a drum of the rice planting process as a prayer for abundant crops.	Hattasan Sonei-ji, Fukuroi, Shizuoka	
Mikawa Dengaku (三河の田楽, mikawa no dengaku)	January 3 (Hōraiji), February 11 (Kōshō-ji)	Theatrical farming dances with elements of dengaku, bugaku and kagura.	Shitara, Aichi	—
Isobe sacred field dance (磯部の御神田, isobe no omita)	June 24	Ritual rice planting accompanied by songs and drumming which is seen as a praise of the field kami. The highlight of the festival is the odorikomi gyōji, the ritual addition of the dances. This is one of the three major rice planting festivals.	Izawa Shrine, Shima, Mie	
Tawara Onda (田原の御田, tawara no onda)	May 3	Theatrical representation of rice planting by two comic characters as a prayer for abundant crops. Their performance is accompanied by four girls dressed as rice planters and by a boy dressed as a cow.	Taji Shrine, Hiyoshi, Nantan, Kyoto	—
Sumiyoshi Rice planting (住吉の御田植, sumiyoshi no otaue)	June 14	Ritual rice planting accompanied by dances and processions from heavily made-up girls (geisha and rice planting girls) that take place on a raised platform amidst the rice field that is connected by a wooden bridge. One of the three major rice planting festivals.	Sumiyoshi taisha, Osaka, Osaka	People planting rice while women dance on a nearby platform.
Hanazono field dance (花園の御田舞, hanazono no ondamai)	8th day of the first month	Theatrical dances and kyōgen display of farming accompanied by drum and flute and given as dedication to the kami and as prayer for an abundant harvest.	Katsuragi, Wakayama	—
Suginohara field dance (杉野原の御田舞, suginohara no ondamai)	February 11	Twenty theatrical dance pieces depicting the various stages of farming and a group dance of men in loincloths accompanied by song and drums.	Ushaku-ji, Aridagawa, Wakayama	—
Nachi Dengaku (那智の田楽, nachi no dengaku)	July 14	Dengaku with hinzasara accompaniment performed as part of the shrine's Nachi no Hi Fire Festival, or grand festival.	Kumano Nachi Taisha, Nachikatsura, Wakayama	—
Oki Dengaku and Niwa no Mai (隠岐の田楽と庭の舞, oki no dengaku to niwa no mai)	September 15 in odd-numbered years	Dengaku tradition and niwa no mai dance, the latter consisting of kami no sumō ('sumo of the gods') and a lion dance.	Oki, Nishinoshima, Shimane	—
Aki Hayashida (安芸のはやし田, aki no hayashida)	last Sunday in May	Taue ritual rice planting accompanied by drum and flute in which songs are sung by the planting girls in a call-and-response format.	Kitahiroshima and Akitakata, Hiroshima	—
Shiohara Daisen Kuyō Taue (塩原の大山供養田植, shiohara no daisen kuyō taue)	May 31 every fourth year	Parade of hayashi musicians and planting girls. This is followed by the actual rice planting ritual in the fields accompanied by drummers and song and initiated by a masked comic character.	Shōbara, Hiroshima	—
Kiragawa Onta Festival (吉良川の御田祭, kiragawa no onta matsuri)	May 3	Various entertainments as a prayer for abundant harvests, including stage performances of rice planting and harvesting, and an old-style Noh, with the climax the sake shibori in which a divine child represented by a straw doll is taken by a woman who cannot bear children. This has led to the alternative name of the festival Ko uke ('child receiving').	Hachimangū Shrine, Muroto, Kōchi	—
Shirahige Shrine Dengaku (白鬚神社の田楽, shirahige jinja no dengaku)	October 18–19	Children dengaku accompanied by flutes with performers wearing characteristic dresses: four boys with large-brimmed straw-hats from which long obi are hanging down; two boys with a drum hanging in front of them; a boy with a staff and a fan and another with a golden eboshi hat carrying a drum and a fan.	Shirahige Shrine, Kuboizumi, Saga, Saga	—

==== Fūryū ====
Fūryū odori (風流踊, lit. 'elegant dances') are traditional folk dances often consisting of large processions of participants typically wearing colorful costumes and accompanied by props. Another form represented below is nenbutsu odori (念仏踊) and the syncretic nenbutsu fūryū (念仏風流). In these dances, dancing is accompanied by Buddhist chanting and hymns.

The most common surviving example of these dances is the bon odori.

There have been 44 designations, all designated under Criteria 1 unless otherwise indicated.

Name	Date	Remarks	Location	Image
Nagai Great Nenbutsu Sword Dance (永井の大念仏剣舞, nagai dainenbutsu kenbai)	August 10	Highly decorated sword dances with dancers wearing large-brimmed hats decorated with flowers.	Morioka, Iwate	—
Devil's Sword Dance (鬼剣舞, oni kenbai)	August 16	Sword dance originating in nenbutsu kenbai of Yamagata Prefecture where it was used to drive away evil spirits. The dances, accompanied by drums, cymbals and flutes are performed by eight men or women wearing demon masks topped by horsehair. The masks in red, white, blue, and black represent the four seasons and four directions from where spirits are driven away and are also thought to represent an alternative form of the Buddha.	Sentoku-ji, Kitakami, Iwate	Masked men with swords and traditional dress dancing on a street.
Nishimonai Bon Odori (西馬音内の盆踊, nishimonai no bon odori)	August 16–18	One of the three main bon odori in Akita Prefecture, performed by women wearing zukin hats that virtually conceal their faces. The dance and handwaving is accompanied by hayashi musicians located on a high roofed platform behind the dancers. The dance is seen as a prayer for a fruitful year and as an obon service.	Ugo, Akita	—
Kemanai Bon Odori (毛馬内の盆踊, kemanai no bon odori)	August 21–23	One of the three main bon odori in Akita Prefecture with participants dancing around bonfires and women dancers wearing scarves that conceal the lower part of their face.	Towada Kemanai, Kazuno, Akita	Women in yukata and head scarf dancing.
Shimohirai Phoenix Dance (下平井の鳳凰の舞, Shimohirai no Hōō no Mai)	Weekend nearest to September 29		Kasuga Shrine, Hinode, Tokyo	
Ogōchi Kashima Dance (小河内の鹿島踊, ogōchi no kashima odori) or Gion odori	2nd Sunday in September	Group dance of men in female costumes with flower decorated headwear.	Ogōchi Shrine, Okutama, Tokyo	—
Niijima Great Dance (新島の大踊, niijima no ōodori)	August 14–15	Bon odori dances distinguished by participants wearing red hats on the first and purple hats on the second day.	Niijima, Tokyo	—
Chakkirako (チャッキラコ)			Miura, Kanagawa	
Yamakita no Omine-iri (山北のお峰入り)		The term omine-iri (お峰入り, lit. 'entering the mountains') refers to practitioners of shugendō setting off on pilgrimages. The Yamakita area was a center of such practitioners in the 19th century.	Yamakita, Kanagawa	
Ayako Dance (綾子舞, ayakomai)	Second Sunday in September	Female group dances (kouta-odori and hayashi-mai) interspersed with kyōgen performances.	Kashiwazaki, Niigata	—
Dai no Saka (大の阪)	August 14–16	A gentle somewhat informal bon odori dance preserving an older style of nenbutsu dance and songs. Participants dance around a central tall yagura in which musicians play flutes, drums and sing.	Hachiman Shrine, Horinouchi, Utonuma, Niigata	—
Mushōno Great Nenbutsu (無生野の大念仏, mushōno no dainenbutsu)	16th day of the first month, August 16	Several dances performed in a small room decorated with long strips of ornamental white paper and shimenawa including the chanting of Buddhist texts and nenbutsu to the accompaniment of large barrel-shaped drums and a purification dance with long halberds.	Mushōno meeting hall, Akiyama, Uenohara, Yamanashi	
Niino Bon Odori (新野の盆踊, niino no bon odori)	August 14–16, 24	Bon odori dance without instrumental accompaniment, where dancers move around a yagura on which five or six singers sit.	Anan, Nagano	—
Atobe Dancing Nenbutsu (跡部の踊り念仏, atobe no odori nenbutsu)	First Sunday in April	Dance in which a small group of women circle two raised drums, singing the nenbutsu and striking small bells.	Saihō-ji, Atobe, Saku, Nagano	—
Wagō Nenbutsu Odori (和合の念仏踊, wagō no nenbutsu odori)	July 13–16	Dance accompanied by drums in with the participants wear hats decorated with white paper strips. On July 14, 15 it is performed as a Buddhist prayer and has been designated under Criteria 2 and 3.	Anan, Nagano	—
Gujō Dance (郡上踊, gujō odori)	July to September	One of the three great bon odori of Japan, gujō odori is characterised by circular movements of the dancers around a small temporary building in which the musicians are located.	Gujō, Gifu	
Shirotori haiden dance (白鳥の拝殿踊, shirotori no haiden odori)	July to September	Dance performed under kiriko lanterns to the sound of clapping geta without any instruments.	Gujō, Gifu	
Kake Dance of Kanomizu (寒水の掛踊, kanomizu no kake odori)	September 8 and 9		Kanomizu, Gujō, Gifu	
Tokuyama Bon Odori (徳山の盆踊, tokuyama no bon odori)	August 15	Bon odori consisting of three pieces: shikan mai performed by farmers wearing deer masks to drive away evil spirits and pray for an abundant harvest; hiyai dance by young girls holding fans and decorated staffs; and a short old style of kyōgen	Asana Shrine, Nakakawane, Kawanehon, Shizuoka	Men with deer masks.
Utōgi Bon Odori (有東木の盆踊, utōgi no bon odori)	August 14–15	Dances of men and women groups around a central figure supporting a decorated tall lantern. The dances are accompanied by drum, paper-strip idiophones and song only.	Tōun-ji, Utōgi, Shizuoka, Shizuoka	—
Night Nenbutsu and Bon Odori of Ayado (綾渡の夜念仏と盆踊, ayado no yonenbutsu to bon odori)	August 15	Religious ritual procession with the singing of Buddhist texts and chants to the Shinto kami.	Heishō-ji, Ayawatashi, Toyota, Aichi	—
Ritual dance of Katte Shrine (勝手神社の神事踊, katte jinja no shinji-odori)	Second Sunday in October	A drum dance of 20 people also known as Kanko dance (羯鼓, kanko odori) performed as part of the shrine's autumn festival. Some dancers carry tree-like structures decorated with paper flowers on their back.	Katte Shrine, Iga, Mie	—
Ōmi Konan Sanyare Dance (近江湖南のサンヤレ踊り, ōmi konan no sanyare odori)	May 3 and 5	Traditional dance performed by boys and youths in Shinto shrines and seven locations. The dancers carry instruments such as drums, flutes, small gongs (surigane), kakko, kotsuzumi and sasara.	Kusatsu and Rittō, Shiga	—
Ōmi Kenketo Festival Naginata Dance (近江のケンケト祭り長刀振り, ōmi no kenketo matsuri naginata furi)	April to early May	Religious festival including a boys' dance with naginata longswords and the jumping over poles.	Moriyama, Kōka, Higashiōmi, and Ryūō, Shiga	—
Ama Fūryū Odori and Kōdori dances (阿万の風流大踊小踊, ama no fūryū odori kōdori)	Sunday nearest to September 15	Two types of dances: odori danced in two rows employing fans to the accompaniment of song, hyoshigi, and shimedaiko, with lyrics originating in the Muromachi and early Edo period; kōdori danced in a single row by about 8 dancers with lyrics after the Genroku era and with a lighter tone. Originally a prayer for rain, the dances are now performed as part of the shrine's autumn festival. The dance has been designated under criteria 2, 3.	Kameoka Hachiman Shrine, Minamiawaji, Hyōgo	—
Yasuraibana (やすらい花)	2nd Sunday in April (Imamiya Shrine, Kawakami Dai-jingū, Genbu Shrine), May 15 (Kamigamo Shrine)	Ritual dance at four shrines with dancers representing demons by wearing red or black long-haired wigs are processing through the streetsmeant accompanied by drums and bells. People standing under a large red umbrella, which is carried in this procession, are said to be protected against illnesses. The dance is also seen as a prayer for abundant crops.	Kita-ku, Kyoto, Kyoto	—
Kuta Hanagasa Dance (久多の花笠踊; kuta no hanagasa odori)	May 5, August 24 (or the nearest Sunday)	Dance performed as a prayer for abundant crops (May 5) and as an expression of thanks for the ripening of the crops (August 24). The main feature is a decorated garden lantern, known as hanagasa.	Shikobuchi Shrine, Sakyō-ku, Kyoto, Kyoto	—
Kyoto Rokusai Nenbutsu (京都の六斎念仏, kyōto no rokusai nenbutsu)	August 8, 14, 15, 23, 29, 30	A variety of entertainments, from nenbutsu odori to later acrobatic, kabuki like theatre, lion dances and drum performances. Rokusai refers to the six designated days of the month which were traditionally used for nenbutsu dances and for proselytizing the people. Dancers carry small double-faced barrel drums.	Kyoto, Kyoto	—
Totsukawa Great Dance (十津川の大踊, totsukawa no ō-odori)	August 13–15	Three bon odori dances: Ohara ō-odori (Aug 13), Musashi ō-odori (Aug 14) and Nishikawa ō-odori (Aug 15), with the main event being the final dance where men with drums, women with fans and a third group with lanterns attached to bamboo poles participate.	Totsukawa, Nara	—
Heron dance of Tsuwano Yasaka Shrine (津和野弥栄神社の鷺舞, tsuwano yasaka jinja no sagimai)	July 20, 24, 27	Two men dressed as herons dance accompanied by song and drums through the streets of Tsuwano. This sagi dance originates from Kyoto, where its tradition has been lost since.	Tsuwano, Shimane	—
Ōmiya Dance (大宮踊, ōmiya odori)	August 13–19	Informal bon odori in shrines and temples in northern Okayama Prefecture with the main event at Fukuda Shrine on August 15. The highlight is a dance called tenko where instead of the usual yukata, the participants wearing various disguises.	Maniwa, Okayama	—
Shiraishi Dance (白石踊, shiraishi odori)	August 13–15	Old form of bon odori or nenbutsu odori accompanied by kudoki (Note: Kudoki is a type of song in which a long narrative is sung to a continuously repeating melody.)	Shiraishi Island, Kasaoka, Okayama	—
Nishiiya God Dance (西祖谷の神代踊, nishiiya no jindai odori)	25th day of the sixth month	Literally the age of the gods dance, it is a group dance accompanied by large drums and seen as a prayer for abundant harvests and the absence of diseases or natural disasters. It is also performed as a prayer for rain, with the sound of the drums resembling thunder, and serves as entertainment for the villagers. This performance is preceded by lion dances and the appearance of a tengu demon.	Miyoshi, Tokushima	—
Ayako Dance (綾子踊, ayako odori)	Sunday between end of August and beginning of September	A rain dance performed by two groups of six men dressed in female costumes.	Kamo Shrine, Mannō, Kagawa	Women in white red turqois kimono dancing.
Takimiya Nenbutsu Dance (滝宮の念仏踊, takimiya no nenbutsu odori)	August 25	Thought to originate from an expression of thanks to Sugawara no Michizane, who in 888 is said to have prayed for seven days and nights for rain, there are two performances: at Taki no Miya and at Taki no Miya Tenman-gū. Dancers wear large round hats decorated with strips of paper, wear fans and intone the nenbutsu phrase accompanied by drums and bells.	Ayagawa, Kagawa	—
Kannōgaku (感応楽, kannōgaku)	every other year April 30, May 1	Drum dance of Ōtomi Shrine praying for a good harvest.	Ōaza Shirōmaru, Buzen, Fukuoka	—
Takeo Araodori (武雄の荒踊, takeo no araodori)	September 23	Literally the Takeo Wild dance, originates from the 1530 victory celebration of the Lord of Takeo over Arima, lord of Shimahara. The one in Nakano is characterised by elegant waving of the hands, while those in Kōze and Utode are more rough and military-like in their movements.	Nakano, Kōze and Utode; Asahi, Takeo, Saga	—
Ōmura Three Dances (Suko Odori, Okita Odori, Kuromaru Odori) (大村の郡三踊（寿古踊・沖田踊・黒丸踊, ōmura no kōri san odori (suko odori, okita odori, kuromaru odori))	At the Ōmura autumn festival	Three fūryū dance entertainments transmitted in Suko, Okita and Kuromaru district of Ōmura city. They originate from a celebration of Lord Sumikore Ōmura regaining control of the land in 1480 after losing the battle of Nakataka in 1474 to Arima. The dances have been designated under criteria 2, 3.	Ōmura, Nagasaki	—
Hirado Jangara (平戸のジャンガラ, hirado no jangara)	August 14–18	Variously described as a type of nenbutsu odori or taiko odori (drum dance), the dance is a prayer for abundant harvests and to console the spirits of the deceased. The dances is characteristic for its use of various types of ornamental headwear topped with flowers and colored paper decorations. Flutes, bells and small barrel-shaped drums carried by the performers are used as accompaniment. The name jangara (jangura) is an onomatopoeic representation of the sounds of the bells and drums.	Hirado, Nagasaki	—
Tsushima Izuhara Bon odori (対馬厳原の盆踊, tsushima izuhara no bon odori)			Tsushima, Nagasaki	—
ohara hachimangū fūryū (野原八幡宮風流)	October 15	Designated under criteria 2 and 3.	Arao, Kumamoto	—
Yoshihirogaku (吉弘楽)	fourth Sunday in July	Male group drum dance with participants wearing straw skirts and various types of headwear. They are seen as a prayer for the ripening of the harvest, driving away insects and for general well-being.	Gakuniwa Hachiman Shrine, Musashi, Kunisaki, Ōita	—
Gokase Araodori (五ヶ瀬の荒踊, gokase no araodori)	September 29 (Sangasho Shrine), September 30 (Nakanobura Shrine)	Dance of around sixty men impersonating various roles such as warriors and demons.	Gokase, Miyazaki	—
Ichiki Tanabata Dance (市来の七夕踊, ichiki no tanabata odori)	August 8	Drum dances performed by around 20 people. In addition, large papier-mâché animals are paraded and used in mock hunts that are seen as prayer for abundant harvest and thanks to the gods. The dance originates in a celebration for the home-coming of Shimazu Yoshihiro from the Korean peninsula.	Ichikikushikino, Kagoshima	Large papier-mache tiger on a road.

==== Storytelling ====
6 designations. All were designated under Criteria 1 except for the Hakata Matsubayashi which was designated under 2 and 3.

Name	Remarks	Location	Image
Echizen Manzai (越前万歳; also spelled 越前萬歳)	A type of manzai performed by two people: a tayū who dances, waves a fan, and speaks words of felications; and a saizō who accompanies no a drum.	Echizen, Fukui	—
Mikawa Manzai< (三河万歳)	A type of manzai traditionally performed as a comic and narritave dialogue between two people, known as tayū and saizō. The tayū dances wearing an eboshi hat and carrying a fan, while the saizō wears a black zukin hat and plays kotsuzumi drums.	Anjō, Nishio and Kōta, Aichi	Three men in traditional Japanese clothes, one with fan, two with drums on a stage.
Owari Manzai (尾張万歳)	A type of manzai claimed to have originated in Chōbo-ji temple in Owari (now Nagoya), during the Shōō era (1288–1293) from a comical play contrived by the monk Mujū Kokushi to make the teachings of the Lotus Sutra understandable for villagers. (Note: An alternative explanation attributes the manzai to low level monks who were forcibly settled in the area following a decree by Toyotomi Hideyoshi from 1594, and who provided various forms of entertainment.)	Chita, Aichi	—
Daimokutate (題目立)	Originally a rite of passage to adulthood performed by 17 year old youths, (Note: Young men of various age from the community and neighboring communities perform the rite today.) the Daimokutate is a semi-dramatic entertainment performed annually on October 12. The participants dressed in samurai clothes with eboshi hats narrate tales of the conflict between the Heike and Genji. Daimokutate has been inscribed by UNESCO as Intangible cultural heritage.	Yahashira Shrine, Tsuge, Nara, Nara	—
Kōwakamai (幸若舞)	Dance narrative of military tales performed by three dancers and a backstage solo drummer, performed on January 20 at Õe Tenman Shrine.	Õe Tenman Shrine, Setaka, Fukuoka, Miyama, Fukuoka	—
Hakata Matsubayashi (博多松囃子, hakata matsubayashi)	Parade on May 3 and 4 centered around three of the Seven Gods of Fortune: Ebisu, Daikokuten and Fukurokuju who are represented by separate groups of people. The groups move from door to door and receive gifts in exchange for a recitation of benevolence (idate). The parade is part of the Hakata Dontaku festival.	Hakata-ku, Fukuoka, Fukuoka	—

==== Ennen and Okonai ====
Ennen (延年, ennen) (lit. "extend the years") are Buddhist temple entertainments performed at the end of Buddhist services and believed to extend the listeners' lifespans.Okonai (おこない, okonai) (lit. "deeds") are Buddhist New Year celebrations in which the evils of the past year are driven away.

There have been 7 designations, all under Criteria 1.

Name	Date	Remarks	Location	Image
Mōtsūji Ennen (毛越寺の延年, mōtsūji no ennen)	January 20 (main event), May 3, November 3	Masked dances with elements of noh and bugaku occasionally to the accompaniment of song, performed after Buddhist rituals as part of the Madarashin Festival.	Mōtsū-ji, Hiraizumi, Iwate	—
Obasama Ennen (小迫の延年, obasama no ennen)	First Sunday in April	Series of masked and unmasked dramas accompanied by flutes and drums, including dengaku dance. They are seen a prayer for abundant crops.	Hakusan Shrine, Kurihara, Miyagi	—
Kotaki Choukrairo Dance (小滝のチョウクライロ舞, kotaki no chōkurairo mai)	Second Saturday in June	A type of ennen elaborate dance performed by young boys wearing highly decorated broad-brimmed straw hats. It derives from Shugendō and is seen as a form of worship of Zaō Gongen.	Kinpō Shrine, Kisakata, Nikaho, Akita	—
Nechiyamadera Ennen (根知山寺の延年, nechiyamadera no ennen)	August 31, September 1	Masked dramas and dances such as lion dances, kagura, manzai and — the highlight of the performances — oteteko mai, performed by a group of young girls whose heads are decorated with flowers. They are seen as prayer for abundant harvest.	Hiyoshi Shrine, Yamadera, Itoigawa, Niigata	—
Nagataki Ennen (長滝の延年, nagataki no ennen)	January 6	Dances and dramas from the Kamakura and Muromachi Period typically consisting of unmasked dances of two men accompanied by hayashi music.	Nagataki Hakusan Shrine, Shirotori, Gujō, Gifu	—
Tōtōmi Hiyondori and Okunai (遠江のひよんどりとおくない, tōtōmi no hiyondori to okunai)	January 3 (Hōzō-ji), January 4 (Fukuman-ji)	Fire dance, where a group of youths, after purifying themselves in the river, is trying to prevent another group carrying fire torches from entering the temple building. Eventually the torches are presented as offerings, followed by more dancing, singing and a taasobi event.	Inasa, Hamamatsu, Shizuoka	—
Oki Kokubunji Lotus Dance (隠岐国分寺蓮華会舞, oki kokubunji renge-e mai)	April 21	Rural bugaku performance with masks and costumes suggesting a Heian period origin.	Kokubun-ji, Okinoshima, Shimane	—

==== Entertainment from abroad and performance arts ====
41 designations. All were designated under criteria 1 unless otherwise indicated.

Name	Date	Remarks	Location	Image
Ōshika Kabuki (大鹿歌舞伎)	May 3 (Taiseki Shrine) and third Sunday of October (Ichiba Shrine)	Rural Kabuki from the early Edo period that originated from travelling Kabuki troupes. During the prohibition of amateur kabuki performances in the Edo to Taishō period, performances were held in shrines and temples of Ōshika as a tribute to the gods.	Ōshika, Nagano	Outdoor stage with actors in traditional Japanese costumes.
Dainichidō Bugaku (大日堂舞楽)	January 2	Nine sacred masked and unmasked dances as a prayer for happiness in the New Year. The Dainichidō Bugaku tradition has an early eighth century Nara period origin, but has considerably evolved since then, picking up local features. The dances have been inscribed on the UNESCO Representative List of the Intangible Cultural Heritage of Humanity.	Kazuno, Akita	Men with golden mask holding a sword.
Kurokawa Noh (黒川能, kurokawa nō)	February 1–2, March 23, May 3, November 11	Ancient form of ritual noh with a history of more than 500 years performed by local people. It is particularly valuable as it preserves elements of noh drama that have disappeared in its urban counterparts.	Kasuga Shrine, Kurokawa, Kushibiki, Tsuruoka, Yamagata	A masked men on stage
Hayashi Family Bugaku (林家舞楽, hayashi-ke bugaku)	May 5 (Jion-ji) and September 14–15 (Yachi Hachimangū)	Rural bugaku tradition from the 9th century originating from Shitennō-ji and handed down in the Hayashi family of shinto priests of Yachi Hachimangū. Performed at the autumn festival of Yachi Hachimangū and the spring festival of Jion-ji.	Yachi Hachimangū, Kahoku and Jion-ji, Sagae; Yamagata	Masked actor with tall headgear and orange dress.
Rope fire (綱火, tsunabi)	23rd day of the 7th month (Takaoka style) and August 24 (Obari Matsushita style)	Puppet play of dolls attached to ropes that are 5–8 m (16–26 ft) above ground. Tsunabi fireworks (Note: Tsunabi are a traditional form of fireworks where originally a bamboo tube filled with gunpowder was fired along a rope.) are attached to the puppets which are then shot along the ropes.	Atago Shrine, Tsukubamirai, Ibaraki	—
Lantern dolls of Annaka Nakajuku (安中中宿の燈篭人形, annaka nakajuku no tōrō ningyō)	not fixed	A puppetry tradition using string-operated dolls with lanterns inserted into their papier-mâché bodies giving a translucent effect to the dolls' faces.	Annaka, Gunma	—
Kiraigō (鬼来迎; or oni-mai, demon dance)	August 16	Buddhist drama or masked kyōgen performed as part of o-bon and depicting a bodhisattva saving a group of people from falling into hell. The play was devised in the Kamakura period by the monk Sekioku to teach the local people the local people the nature of cause-and-effect and the virtues of the Buddha.	Kōsai-ji, Yokoshibahikari, Chiba	—
Kawano Kuruma Ningyo (川野車人形, kawano kuruma ningyō)	First Saturday or Sunday in March		Okutama, Tokyo	—
Hachioji Kuruma Ningyo (八王子車人形, hachiōji kuruma ningyō)			Tokyo	—
Sagami Ningyō Shibai (相模人形芝居)	Sunday nearest February 18	Bunraku tradition with roots in the tradition of the narrator Takemoto Gidayū and playwright Chikamatsu Monzaemon.	Atsugi, Kanagawa	—
Sado Ningyō Shibai (佐渡の人形芝居（文弥人形、説経人形、のろま人形, sado no ningyō shibai (bunya ningyō, sekkyō ningyō, noruma ningyō)	various times, typically around May, June and July	Three puppet traditions: noruma ningyō, where simple dolls enact humorous dramas incorporating improvised texts between the puppeteers; bunya and sekkyō ningyō with spoken narrative accompanied by shamisen play.	Sado, Niigata	—
Itoigawa Noh Bugaku (糸魚川・能生の舞楽, itoigawa nō no bugaku)	April 10–11 (Amatsu Shrine), April 24 (Nō Hakusan Shrine)	Two traditions of predominantly children bugaku (Note: Out of 12 pieces each, four of the dances at Amatsu Shrine and three dances at Nō Hakusan Shrine are performed by adults.) performed by boys with heavy white make-up and small crown-like hats adorned with flower. Occasionally masks are used.	Itoigawa, Niigata	—
Yahiko Shrine Lantern Carrying and Bugaku (弥彦神社燈篭おしと舞楽, yahiko jinja tōrō-oshi to bugaku)	July 25 (main event), also on April 18 (daidai kagura), and in January/February (shōkagura)	Parade of lanterns and mikoshi to the shrine where kami uta (god songs) are intoned. Performance of bugaku dances with a connection to kagura.	Yahiko Shrine, Yahiko, Niigata	—
Etchū Chigomai (越中の稚児舞, etchū no chigomai)	Third Sunday in April (Hōfuku-ji), August 25 (Kumano Shrine), September 4 (Kamo Shrine)	Three traditions of children bugaku performed by boys aged 10 to 14 accompanied by hayashi music of ōdaiko and flutes.	Hōfuku-ji, Kurobe, Kumano Shrine, Toyama and Kamo Shrine, Imizu; Toyama	—
Oguchi Dekumawashi (尾口のでくまわし, oguchi no dekumawashi)	mid-February	One of five surviving bunya-ningyō traditions. (Note: The bunya style of Ningyō Jōruri| is named after puppeteer Okamoto Bunya (1633–1694) and is characterised by high-pitched grief-stricken vocal delivery.) Here a single person operates the puppets.	Tsurugi, Hakusan, Ishikawa	—
Itozaki Buddha Dance (糸崎の仏舞, itozaki no hotoke no mai)	April 18, every other year	Buddhist dance of 10 dancers wearing golden masks representing the Buddha and two people wearing white masks of children to the accompaniment of drums, bells and song. The performance is seen as a prayer for abundant harvest and for the spirits of the deceased.	Fukui, Fukui	—
Tenzushi Mai Dance (天津司舞)	Sunday nearest April 10	Parade and puppet performance of dengaku and dramatic pieces using almost life-size karakuri dolls on poles.	Tenzushi Shrine, Kose, Kōfu, Yamanashi	
Makuwa Ningyō Jōruri (真桑人形浄瑠璃)	March 20	Ningyō Jōruri puppetry from the Genroku era (1688–1703) dedicated to Fukuda Minamoto Shichirō who brought irrigation to Makuwa.	Motosu, Gifu	—
Nōgō Noh and Kyōgen (能郷の能・狂言, nōgō no nō kyōgen)	April 13	Ritual performance of noh and kyōgen by members of 16 households as prayer for abundant crops and safety at home. The performances represent elements of the Kanze school of noh (founded by Kan'ami in the 14th century) and of the Izumi school of kyōgen (from 1614) but also older dramatic elements predating these schools.	Nōgō Hakusan Shrine, Motosu, Gifu	—
Tōtōmi Mori Bugaku (遠江森町の舞楽, tōtōmi morimachi no bugaku)	First Saturday in April (Ama no Miya Shrine), Saturday, Sunday in mid-April (Oguni Shrine), Saturday, Sunday in mid-July (Yamana Shrine)	Three traditions of bugaku dance with a history going back to the early 8th century. The dances as a whole are seen as a prayer for abundant harvest and to drive away diseases; at Oguni Shrine also as a prayer for peace and prosperity of the ujiko. In all three traditions, lion dances and other entertainments are included beyond the bugaku elements.	Mori, Shizuoka	—
Shizuoka Sengen Shrine Hatsukakae Festival Chigo Bugaku (静岡浅間神社廿日会祭の稚児舞楽, shizuoka sengen jinja hatsukaesai no chigo bugaku)	April 5		Shizuoka, Shizuoka	—
Chiryū Float Festival Bunraku and Karakuri (知立の山車文楽とからくり, chiryū no dashi bunraku to karakuri)	May 2–3 (Note: A grand festival is held biannually and a smaller festival in the other years.)	Performance of bunraku on a small stage in front and of karakuri puppets on the top-tier of a festival float. This is the only performance of ningyō jōruri on a dashi float in Japan.	Kanda Chiryū Shrine, Chiryū, Aichi	
Anori Ningyō Shibai (安乗の人形芝居, anori no ningyō shibai)	September 15–16	A 400 year old puppetry tradition that originated as part of the Anori Shrine's festival.	Hachiman (Anori) Shrine, Ago, Shima, Mie	Two black clothed and masked people operating a large doll on stage.
Lanterns of Saeki village (佐伯灯籠, saeki tōrō)	August 14	Joint festival of four shrines (Hiedano, Goryō, Kawakuma, Wakamiya) as part of the o-bon celebrations praying for abundant crops. Five large straw torches (tōrō) and mikoshi are paraded through town, with the highlight being a clash between the mikoshi and large drums. Parallel to these events are ningyō jōruri puppetry performances	Yoshikawa, Kameoka, Kyoto	—
Saga Dainenbutsu Kyōgen (嵯峨大念仏狂言, saga dainenbutsu kyōgen)	March 15, the 1st Sunday, 2nd Saturday and Sunday in April	A pantomime form of kyōgen realized through the actions and costumes of the actors. This tradition dates to the Kamakura Period and was devised by the monk Engaku Shōnin (1223–1311) who used such dramas to proselytize and in teaching of Buddhist concepts.	Seiryō-ji, Kyoto, Kyoto	—
Matsunoo-dera Buddha Dance (松尾寺の仏舞matsunoodera no hotoke mai)	May 8	Buddhist dance of six dancers wearing one of three types of golden masks respectively representing Dainichi Nyorai, Shaka Nyorai and Amida Nyorai. The dances are accompanied by the gagaku piece Etenraku.	Matsunoo-dera, Maizuru, Kyoto	—
Mibu Kyōgen (壬生狂言, mibu kyōgen)	April 21–27 (main performance)	A pantomime form of kyōgen, also known as Mibu Nenbutsu Kyōgen, originally devised by the Kamakura Period monk Engaku Shōnin (1223–1311) in order to convey Buddhist teachings, the plays have over the years included other narratives as well. Actors are always masked and accompanied by hayashi music.	Mibu-dera, Kyoto, Kyoto	
Shōryōe Bugaku (聖霊会の舞楽, shōryōe no bugaku)	April 22	Bugaku dance performance as part of a commemorative Buddhist service for Prince Shōtoku, the founder of the temple.	Shitennō-ji, Osaka, Osaka	—
Kuruma Ōtoshi Shrine Okina Dance (車大歳神社の翁舞, kuruma ōtoshi jinja no okina mai)	January 14	An okina dance (Note: Okina is an ancient form of noh, which it predates. More similar to a shinto ritual performance, it was possibly created in the 10th century in Okinawa. Unlike the typical noh play it is meant to be joyous and aims to bring peace, longevity and prosperity. The chief characters are typically okina (old man), senzai (one thousand years [old]) and sanbasō (a third man). Extant examples exist in kabuki, bunraku and folk theatre.) performance with senzai, okina, sanbasō and chichi no jō thought to reach back to the Muromachi Period. (Note: This is indicated by the appearance of Chich no jō whose character disappeared during the Muromachi Period and whose role was subsequently taken over by senzai.)	Kuruma Ōtoshi Shrine, Suma, Kobe, Hyōgo	
Awaji Ningyō Jōruri (淡路人形浄瑠璃)	Various times (Note: Performances are regularly held at the purpose built Awaji Ningyō Jōruri Hall.)	Old bunraku tradition that claims a 500-year history starting with the legendary puppeteer Hyaku-dayū and originated as a ritual to Ebisu and other deities protecting the land and fishermen. The Osaka tradition of bunraku play drew its inspiration from that of Awaji and nowadays both are virtually identical.	Minamiawaji, Hyōgo	—
Narazuhiko Shrine Okina Dance (奈良豆比古神社の翁舞, narazuhiko jinja no okina mai)	October 8	Part of the autumn festival, this okina dance is a prayer for peace, safety of the land, prosperity and abundant harvests. This performance is characterized by the appearance of an unmasked senzai, masked sanbasō and a white masked tayū actor instead of the usual okina. Two adjuncts, known as waki accompany the okina and the trio's appearance is followed by a question and answer dialogue between senzai and sanbasō.	Narazuhiko Shrine, Nara, Nara	Three masked men in traditional Japanese clothes, one in orange the others in green gold.
Awa Ningyō Jōruri (阿波人形浄瑠璃)	Various times and locations	A bunraku tradition influenced by that of nearby Awaji Island from where the supporting Hachisuka clan summoned puppet groups. The oldest record of this tradition dates to 1887.	Awa, Tokushima Prefecture	—
Shōdoshima rural Kabuki (小豆島農村歌舞伎, shōdoshima nōson kabuki)	May 3 (Hitoyama) and second Sunday of October (Nakayama)	A form of rural Kabuki where all the roles are performed by local residents. Designated under criteria 2, 3.	Shōdoshima and Tonoshō, Shōzu District, Kagawa Prefecture	—
Lantern Dolls of Yame Fukushima (八女福島の燈篭人形, yame fukushima tōrō ningyō)	September 22–24	String-and-pole-manipulated karakuri puppet tradition where the dolls are operated by six men from beside or beneath a temporary yatai stage. The event goes back to 1744 when lanterns were offered to the shrine.	Fukushima Hachiman Shrine, Miyano, Yame, Fukuoka	—
Hachiman Kohyō Shrine Kugutsushi Dance and Sumo (八幡古表神社の傀儡子の舞と相撲, hachiman kohyō jinja no kugutsu no mai to sumō)	August 12–14, every four years	A pre-bunraku tradition of puppetry known as kugutsushi or kairaishi in which a dance piece (kuwashi o no mai) is followed by a sumō bout between puppets.	Yoshitomi, Fukuoka	—
Matsubayashi of Kikuchi (菊池の松囃子, kikuchi matsubayashi)	October 13	Rural noh-like performances of matsubayashi nō, kyōgen and shimai accompanied by ōtsuzumi, kotsuzumi, taiko and yōkyoku on a nō stage from 1796. The origins of this entertainment date to the 14th century, when Kikuchi Takemitsu, lord of Higo, welcomed Kamenaga Shinnō, a son of Emperor Go-Daigo.	Kikuchi Shrine, Kikuchi, Kumamoto	—
Koyō Shrine Kugutsushi Dance and Sumo (古要神社の傀儡子の舞と相撲, koyō jinja no kugutsushi no mai to sumō)	October 12, every 3 years	Performance of kugutsushi (Note: A pre-bunraku tradition of puppetry also referred to as kairaishi.) puppets consisting of a dance (kugutsu mai) followed by a sumō bout.	Koyō Shrine, Nakatsu, Ōita	—
Yamanokuchi tradition of Bunya Ningyō (山之口の文弥人形, yamanokuchi bunya ningyō)	Four times a year	One of five surviving bunya-ningyō traditions. The Yamanokuchi tradition is thought to date back to the early Edo period and is today preserved in a purpose-built museum.	Miyakonojō, Miyazaki	—
Shodon Shibaya (諸鈍芝居)	15th day of the eighth month	A local form of kabuki also known as jikyōgen, performed by men wearing conical jingasa war hats made of paper. The character known as sanbato is wearing a bowler hat and carries a baton. The program includes dances, kyōgen and puppet entertainment.	Setouchi, Kagoshima	—
Tōgō tradition of Bunya-bushi Ningyō Jōruri (東郷文弥節人形浄瑠璃, tōgō bunya bushi ningyō jōruri)	Various times	A narrative type of bunya-ningyō puppetry accompanied by shamisen only and originating in the bunraku tradition of Kansai. Designated under criteria 2, 3.	Tōgō, Satsumasendai, Kagoshima	—
Yoron full moon dance (与論の十五夜踊, yoron jūgoya odori; lit. Yoron 15th day dance)	15th day of the third, eighth and tenth month	A performance alternating between kyōgen and fūryū. The dances are seen as prayer for peace on the island, for abundant crops and also as a thanks for the harvest.	Yoron, Kagoshima	—

==== Other ====
18 designations. All were designated under Criteria 1 except for the Daiko of the Kokura Gion Festival and the Inaba and Tajima Kirin Lion dance which were designated under criteria 2 and 3.

Name	Date	Remarks	Location	Image
Ainu Ancient Dances (アイヌ古式舞踊, ainu koshiki buyō)	Various times	Twelve types of traditional Ainu dances and nine songs including ritual dances performed during festivals, (Note: Ritual Ainu dances include iomante (to drive away bears), pekanpe (prayers for the ripening of water chestnut), shishamo (for catching fish), bow dances, sword dances and dances accompanying chores.) imitative dances, (Note: Imitative Ainu dances include tsuru no mai (crane dance).) dances for entertainment only. Many of these are circular dances and accompanied by song.	Hokkaido	—
Ritual Entertainments of Ame no Miya Shrine (雨宮の神事芸能, ame no miya no shinji geinō)	April 29, every 3 years	Elegant dances with hayashi flutes and drums aimed at driving away diseases and evil spirits from the fields and praying for abundant crops. The highlight is the piece Hashigagari in which four large lion heads are paraded in front of the shrine.	Ame no Miya Shrine, Chikuma, Nagano	—
Snow Festival (雪祭)			Anan, Nagano	
Ritual entertainments of Nangū Shrine (南宮の神事芸能, nangū no shinji geinō)	May 4–5	Ritual entertainments including ritual rice planting (otaue), mikoshi carrying and ritual dances that serve as a prayer for abundant crops.	Nangū Taisha, Tarui, Gifu	—
Kamikamogawa Sumiyoshi Shrine Shinji Dance (上鴨川住吉神社神事舞, kamikamogawa sumiyoshi jinja shinji-mai)	First weekend in October	Various forms of entertainment as part of the shrine's festival, such as: dengaku, noh, sword dances, lion dances, fan dances, and sarugaku.	Sumiyoshi Shrine, Kamikamogawa, Katō, Hyōgo	—
Ritual Entertainments of Kasuga Wakamiya On matsuri (春日若宮おん祭の神事芸能, kasuga wakamiya on matsuri no shinji geinō)	December 15–18	Various entertainments including a presentation of horsemanship skills, kagura, dengaku, bugaku, yamato mai and sarugaku, a form of noh. The festival was initiated by Fujiwara no Tadamichi to welcome and appease the kami in response to a series of floods, famines and disease during the chōshō era.	Nara, Nara	People in traditional Japanese court dress.
Inaba and Tajima Kirin Lion dance (因幡・但馬の麒麟獅子舞, inaba tajima no kirin shishimai)	Various dates	A form of lion dance with slow elegant movements, where the lion is composed of two people one of them wearing a head mask of a kirin. It has been designated under criteria 2 and 3.	Shin'onsen, Hyōgo; Tottori, Iwami, Yazu, Wakasa, Chizu, Yurihama, Tottori	—
Daiko of the Kokura Gion Festival (小倉祇園祭の小倉祇園太鼓, kokura gion matsuri no kokura gion daiko)	Friday, Saturday, Sunday around the third Saturday of July	Grand festival of Kokura Yasaka shrine characterised by large drums with drums pulled along on floats.	Kokurakita-ku, Kitakyushu, Fukuoka	—
Takezaki Kanzeonji Temple's Shujōe Oni Festival (竹崎観世音寺修正会鬼祭, takezaki kanzeonji shujōe oni matsuri)	January 2–3	A Hadaka Matsuri where men in loinclothes try to stop an oni in a red kimono carrying a box. The event also includes a masked dance of two boys.	Tara, Saga	—
Nagasaki Kunchi Hono-Odori (長崎くんちの奉納踊, nagasaki kunchi no hōnō odori)	October 7–9	Part of the Suwa Shrine festival, these are a set of ceremonial dedicatory dances with distinct foreign influences from China, Holland and Portugal: jaodori (dragon dance), lion dance, kujira no shiofuki (blowing of the whale), kokkodesho (drum dance), aranda manzai.	Nagasaki, Nagasaki	Men carrying a long dragon.
Shujō Oni Festival (修正鬼会, shujō onie)	7th day of the first month	New Year fire festival of Rokugo Manzan praying for a good harvest and health. The event features a fight between two ogres brandishing torches.	Bungotakada, Kunisaki Peninsula, Ōita	—
Ada Shinugu (安田のシヌグ)	, Two days starting with the day of the boar in the 7th month	Ritual praying for a good harvest and health in which men climb a mountain, cover themselves in plants, taking the role of deities for one day.	Kunigami, Okinawa	—
Iejima Village Dance (伊江島の村踊, iejima no mura-odori)	Mid November	Various dances, including a portrayal of the Chūshingura story.	Ie, Okinawa	—
Kohamajima Bon, Kitsugan, and Taneduri Festivals (小浜島の盆、結願祭、種子取祭の芸能)	August 13–16, September/October, October/November		Kohamajima, Okinawa	
Iriomote Shichi Festival (西表島の節祭, iriomotejima no shichi)	Tenth month	Thanksgiving ritual for the harvest in which men row out in boats to meet the deity of abundant crops while women perform dedicatory dances to Maitreya Buddha.	Iriomote, Okinawa	—
Tarama Hōnensai Festival (多良間の豊年祭, tarama no hōnensai)	8th day of the 8th month	Variety of dances and drama performed over three days as a thanksgiving prayer for abundant crops. The performances include lion dances, bō-odori, nisai odori and kyōgen.	Nakasuji and Shiokawa, Tarama, Okinawa	—
Taketomi Tanadui Festival (竹富島の種子取, taketomi no tanadōi; lit. seed-picking ceremony of Taketomi)	27th and 28th day of the 9th month	Festival with a variety of performing arts including dances by women or girls and kyōgen in dedication to the gods for purifying the ground and starting the sowing of seeds.	Taketomi, Okinawa	—
Yonaguni Festival Arts (与那国島の祭事の芸能, yonagunijima no saiji no geinō)	Unfixed dates	Ritual entertainment of harvest thanksgiving including a narrative prayer, dances, lion dances, and group dances interspersed with kyōgen performances.	Yonaguni, Okinawa	—

=== Folk techniques ===
==== Manufacturing and production ====
17 designations.

Name	Criteria	Remarks	Location	Image
Manufacture technology of Japanese-style ships in the Tsugaru Strait and surrounding area (津軽海峡及び周辺地域における和船製作技術, Tsugaru kaikyō oyobi shūhen chiiki ni okeru wasen seisaku gijutsu)	2, 3		Tsugaru Strait, Aomori	—
Manufacture technology of Itaya winnowing baskets in Akita (秋田のイタヤ箕製作技術, Akita no itaya-mi seisaku gijutsu)	3		Taiheikurosawa, Akita and Kumoshikari, Kakunodate, Semboku; Akita	—
Manufacture technology of Kōnosu Akamono (red things for good luck) (鴻巣の赤物製作技術, kōnosu no akamono seisaku gijutsu)	3		Kōnosu, Saitama	—
Excavation technology of Kazusa (上総掘りの技術, kazusa bori no gijutsu)	3		Kazusa, Chiba	—
Manufacture technology of Kizumi wisteria winnowing baskets (木積の藤箕製作技術, Kizumi no fujimi seisaku gijutsu)	3	Technique of making Winnowing baskets out of wisteria, moso and other types of bamboo for use in agriculture and tea cultivation. The technology goes back to the mid-Edo period.	Kizumi, Sōsa, Chiba	—
Manufacture technology of Tarai Bune tub boats in Ogi (小木のたらい舟製作技術, ogi no taraibune seisaku gijutsu)	3	Construction technique of 150 cm × 130 cm × 50 cm (59 in × 51 in × 20 in) sized tub boats used for spear fishing and seaweed collection since the late Edo period.	Ogi, Sado, Niigata	Tub shaped boats in the sea.
Manufacture technology of Ronden Kumanashi winnowing baskets (論田・熊無の藤箕製作技術, ronden kumanashi no fujimi seisaku gijutsu)	3	Winnowing basket making technique transmitted in two communities since the mid-Edo period and sold in the Hokuriku region. Wisteria, bamboo, black locust and sometimes yama urushi (山漆) are used in the production process. In addition to the basket making, the designated property includes the collection and processing of raw materials.	Ronden and Kumanashi, Himi, Toyama	—
Salt-making technology of the agehamashiki method on the Noto Peninsula (能登の揚浜式製塩の技術, Noto no agehamashiki seien no gijutsu)	2, 3		Shimizu, Suzu, Ishikawa	—
Cormorant fishing on the Nagara River craft (長良川の鵜飼漁の技術, nagaragawa no ukairyō no gijutsu)	2, 3	Cormorant fishing for ayu sweetfish on the middle Nagara River using wooden boats that hold three people: the fishing master, a helper and the pilot and that feature an iron basket holding a large fire at the front of the boat.	Gifu, Gifu Prefecture	Boat, man, cormorant and a fire at the end of the boat at night.
Ama diving in Toba and Shima (鳥羽・志摩の海女漁の技術, toba shima no amaryō no gijutsu)	3	A traditional form of woman freediving for fishing already mentioned in the Engishiki and Man'yōshū. The goal are Turbo sazae, Haliotis diversicolor, Iwagaki oysters, Japanese spiny lobster, Sea urchin, Sea cucumber, arame, hijiki and Gelidiaceae.	Toba and Shima, Mie	White clad women in water with a large barrel.
Manufacture technology of Yoshino barrel-staves (吉野の樽丸製作技術, Yoshino no tarumaru seisaku gijutsu)	3		Nara	—
Ama diving in Wajima (輪島の海女漁の技術, wajima no amaryō no gijutsu)	3		Wajima, Ishikawa	—
Ishizuchi Kurocha Production Technique (石鎚黒茶の製造技術, ishizuchi kurocha no seizō gijutsu)	3	Manufacture technology of ishizuchi kurocha (dark tea), a type of fermented tea from Shikoku	Saijō, Tokushima	—
Awa-tafu Mulberry Cloth Production Technique (阿波の太布製造技術, awa no tafu seizō gijutsu)	3		Tokushima	—
Awabancha production technology (阿波晩茶の製造技術, awabancha no seizō gijutsu)	3	Manufacture technology of awabancha, a type of fermented tea from the Shikoku Mountains.	Kamikatsu, Naka and Minami, Tokushima	—
Goishicha production technology (大豊の碁石茶製造技術, ōtoyo no goishicha seizō gijutsu)	3	Manufacture technology of goishicha, a type of fermented tea from the Shikoku Mountains.	Ōtoyo, Kōchi	—
Manufacture technology of hot-springs mineral deposits of Myōban Onsen in Beppu (別府明礬温泉の湯の花製造技術, Beppu Myōban onsen no yu no hana seizō gijutsu)	3		Myōban, Beppu, Ōita	

==== Necessities of life ====
3 designations, all under criteria 3.

Name	Remarks	Location	Image
Manufacture techniques of Etchū Fukuoka sedge-woven hats (越中福岡の菅笠製作技術, etchū fukuoka no sugegasa seisaku gijutsu)	Sedge hat making technique for use in agriculture, festivals and traditional events, that is characterised by a division of labor. In the process men are assembling thin-sliced bamboo sticks into a cone shaped frame, while women sew the sedge onto it. The craft has an unchanged history of more than 400 years and flourished in the early Edo period (17th century).	Fukuoka, Takaoka, Toyama	—
Manufacture techniques of Enako Bandori (straw raincoats) (江名子バンドリの製作技術, enako bandori noseisaku gijutsu)	Manufacturing technique of rain coats used in agricultura, that has been a winter farmer side-job in Enako and goes back to the Edo period. The designation includes all process necessary for the production of Enako straw rain coats, from harvest to the final touches on the product. Bandori is a local word for the Japanese giant flying squirrel to which wearers of these raincoats are said to resemble.	Enako-chō, Takayama, Gifu	—
Yoronjima bashōfu (fibre banana) cloth manufacture craft (与論島の芭蕉布製造技術, yoronjima no bashōfu seizō gijutsu)	Harvesting and processing of the Japanese fibre banana for the production of textiles by weaving on Yoronjima island.	Yoron, Yoronjima, Ōshima District, Kagoshima	—

== See also ==
- List of Intangible Cultural Heritage elements in Japan
