= List of festivals in Aomori Prefecture =

Aomori Prefecture boasts a variety of festivals year-round. It is known widely for the Aomori Nebuta Matsuri, one of the Three Great Festivals of Tōhoku. During late April hanami festivals are held across the prefecture, with the most prominent of the festivals being located on the grounds of Hirosaki Castle. Summer and autumn hold many distinct festivals with bright lights, floats, dancing and music. Winter is centered on snow festivals where attendees can view ice sculptures and enjoy local cuisine inside an ice hut. This is a list of festivals in Aomori Prefecture.

== Spring hanami festivals ==
- Aomori City – Gappo Park
- Goshogawara City – Ashino Park
- Hiranai Town – Yogoshiyama Forest Park
- Hirosaki City – Hirosaki Park
- Hirosaki City – Sakurabayashi Park, the World's Number One Cherry Rows
- Towada City – Government Office Quarter

== Summer ==
- Aomori Nebuta Festival (Aomori City)
- Fukaura Sea Festival – The Golden Sea of Japan (Fukaura Town)
- Goshogawara Tachineputa Festival (Goshogawara City)
- Hachinohe Sansha Taisai Festival (Hachinohe City)
- Hirosaki Neputa Festival (Hirosaki City)
- Kuroishi Neputa Festival (Kuroishi City)
- Hiranai Nebuta Festival (Hiranai Town)
- Kuroishi Yosare – One of Japan's 3 Great Dances (Kuroishi City)
- Lake Towada Kosui Festival
- Minmaya Yoshitsune Festival (Sotogahama Town)
- Misawa Festival (Misawa City)
- Osorezan Grand Festival (Mutsu City)
- Tosa no Sunayama Festival (Goshogawara City)
- Tanabu Festival (Mutsu City)

== Autumn ==
- Osorezan Autumn Worship (Mutsu City)
- Hirosaki Castle Chrysanthemum and Autumn Leaves Festival (Hirosaki City)
- Hachinohe Chrysanthemum Festival (Hachinohe City)
- Towada City Fall Festival “Yuso Nambu Koma Odori” (Towada City)
- Ohata Festival (Mutsu City)
- Scallop Festival (Hiranai Town)

== Winter ==
- Towadako Fuyu Monogatari Winter Story Festival (Towada City)
- Hirosaki Castle Snow Lantern Festival (Hirosaki City)
- Hachinohe Enburi Festival (Hachinohe City)

== See also ==
- Japanese festivals
