= Kakunodate-matsuri =

Japanese festival

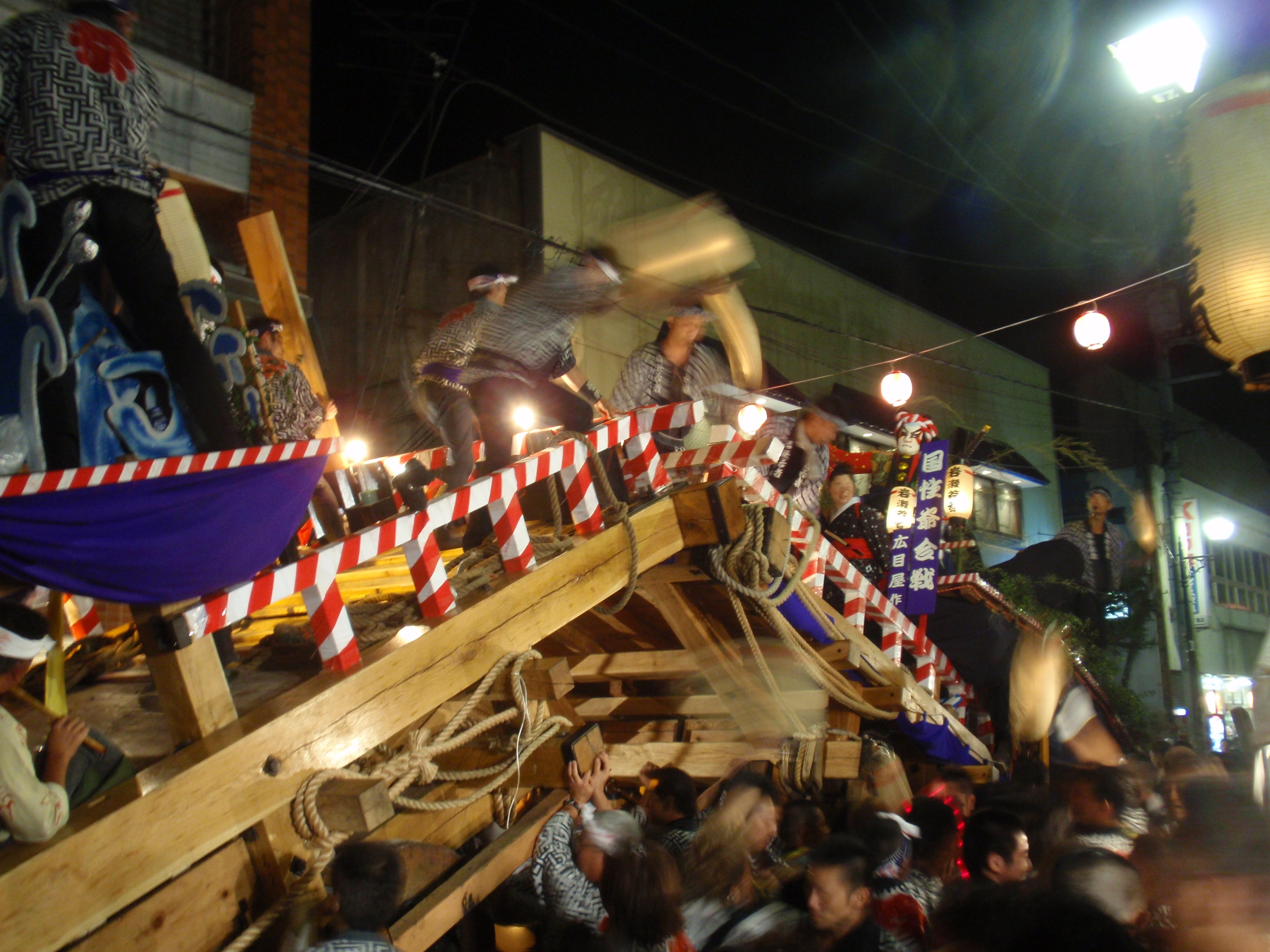
Floats colliding at the Kakunodate-matsuri, September 2008

Kakunodate-matsuri (角館祭り) is a Japanese festival celebrated from 7 to 9 September in Kakunodate, Akita. Its rites centre on Shinmei-sha shrine. As well as a procession and traditional dances, it is celebrated for the oyamabayashi in which the floats collide into each other. It has a 350-year history, and in 1991 was designated an Important Intangible Folk Cultural Property.

== See also ==
- Matsuri
- List of Important Intangible Folk Cultural Properties
- Important Intangible Cultural Properties of Japan
