= Hachinohe Sansha Taisai =

Annual festival in Hachinohe, Aomori, Japan

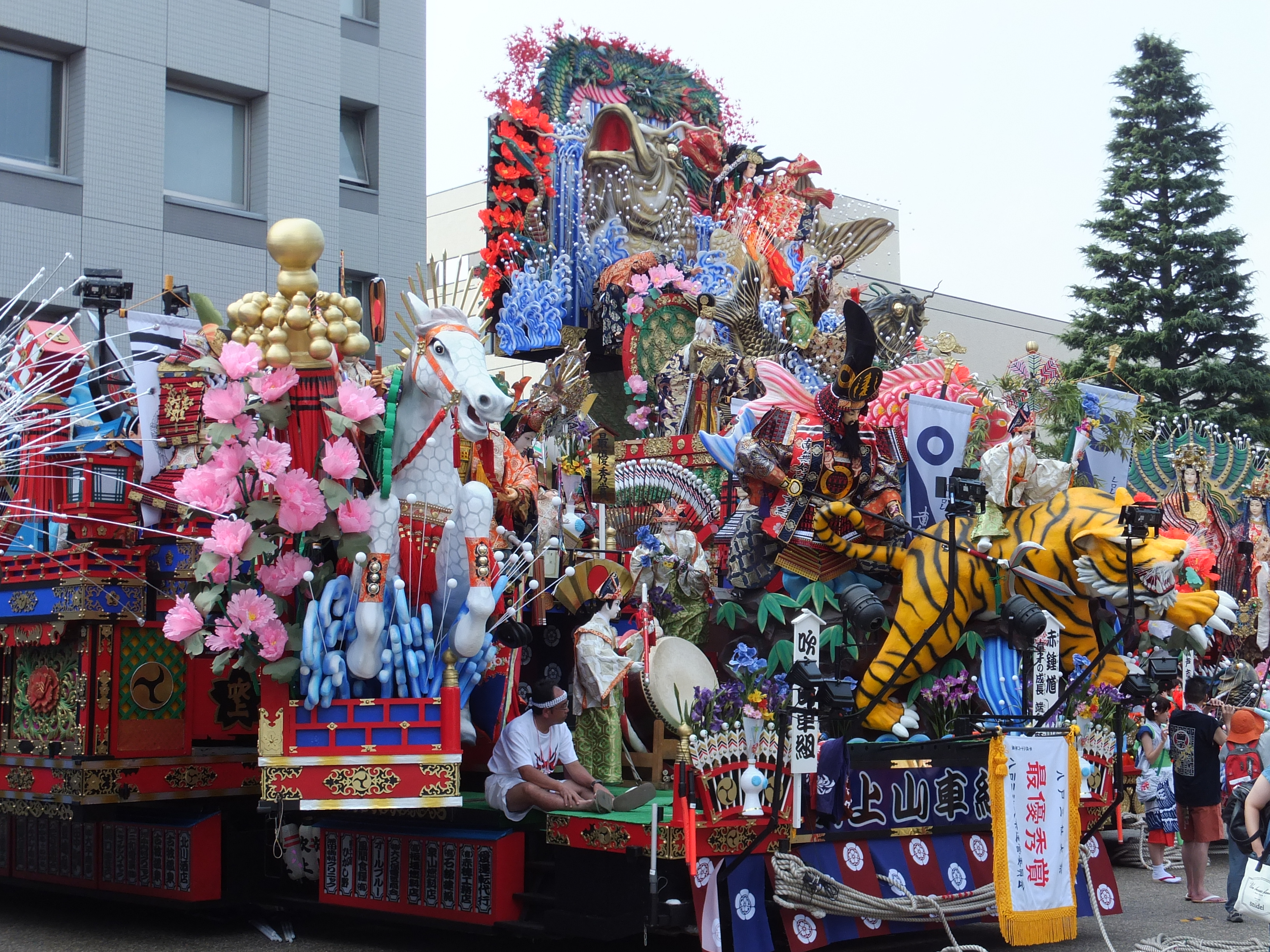
Float during the Hachinohe Sansha Taisai, 2014

Hachinohe Sansha Taisai (八戸三社大祭) is a Japanese festival celebrated from July 31 to August 4 in Hachinohe, Aomori Prefecture, Japan. Its rites center on three Shinto shrines: Ogami (霊神社), Shinra (新羅神社), and Shinmei (神明宮) shrines. There is a procession of twenty-seven floats and three mikoshi are also borne through the streets. It has a two hundred and ninety-year history and in 2004 was designated an Important Intangible Folk Cultural Property.

On August 2, the Chojasan Shinra Shrine holds the annual Kiba Dakyuu (騎馬打球) tournament. It is the traditional Kagami-style dakyu and is held only in Hachinohe, Yamagata Prefecture, and the Imperial Household Agency.

== See also ==
- List of festivals in Aomori Prefecture
- List of Important Intangible Folk Cultural Properties
- Important Intangible Cultural Properties of Japan
- Dakyu
