= Shinjō Matsuri =

Japanese festival

- Logo for the Shinjō Matsuri, celebrating its 260th anniversary.
- Observed by: Shinjō, Yamagata Prefecture, Japan
- Type: local, religious
- Begins: 24 August
- Ends: 26 August
- Date: August 24, August 25, August 26
- Duration: 3 days
- Frequency: annual

The Shinjō Matsuri (新庄まつりの山車行事) is a Japanese festival celebrated from 24 to 26 August in Shinjō, Yamagata Prefecture. Mikoshi and approximately twenty floats are drawn through the streets, accompanied by odori, drums, and other performers. It has a two hundred and fifty-year history and was designated as an Important Intangible Folk Cultural Property in 2009.

== History ==
The festival in Shinjō, and in particular their use of floats called yatai (屋台), is thought to have been initiated in 1756 in the midst of a famine during the Hōreki era. The event was planned by Tozawa Masanobu (1720–1756) who was the head of the Shinjō domain. The festival served not only to serve as a time of prayer for the upcoming harvest, but also to improve morale among the populace. The floats appearing in the festival are thought to have been initially influenced by the Gion Matsuri, but have since focused on themes related to kabuki, legendary animals, and elaborate scenes in nature.

In 2009, the festival was granted the Important Intangible Folk Cultural Property designation by the Japanese government's Agency for Cultural Affairs.

== Event structure ==
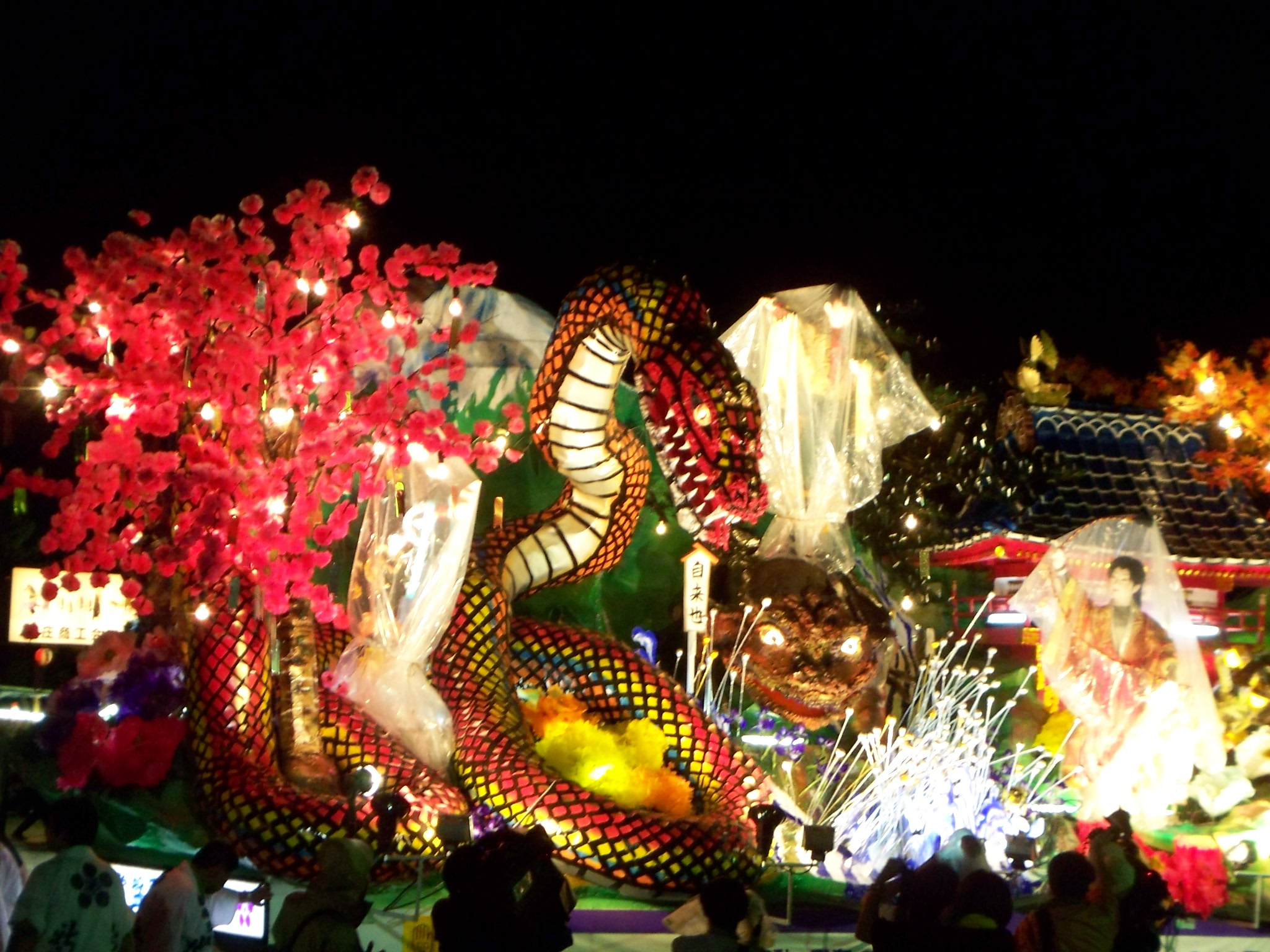
A float featuring a snake during the initial yoi matsuri of the Shinjo Matsuri.

The festival has three stages: yoi matsuri (宵まつり, "night festival"), hon matsuri (本まつり, "main festival"), and go matsuri (後まつり, "latter festival"). Floats will parade through the city while being accompanied by performers who play flutes, cymbals, taiko, and shamisen on a set repertoire of four pieces. The floats themselves are constructed by various municipalities within the city, and each municipality has its own associated performance group. Approximately 20 groups are represented in total. Generally, floats include life-size versions of famous kabuki performers, animals, and historical figures that are depicted in nature such as on mountains or rivers. One performance specific to the Shinjō Matsuri is the shishi-odori (鹿子踊り), a local dance that features men wearing deer-like hoods.

In 2015, event coordinators began using GPS systems to position floats for the parade, to help event attendants locate floats, and to ease concerns over traffic congestion.

== See also ==
- Matsuri
- List of Important Intangible Folk Cultural Properties
- Important Intangible Cultural Properties of Japan
