= Tōkoyasaka Jinja tōnin gyōji =

Tōkoyasaka Jinja tōnin gyōji (東湖八坂神社のトウニン（統人）行事) is a festival celebrated in Oga and Katagami, Akita Prefecture, Japan. The main event is on 7 July. In 1986 it was designated an Important Intangible Folk Cultural Property.

== See also ==
- Japanese festivals
- List of festivals in Japan
- List of Important Intangible Folk Cultural Properties
- Intangible Cultural Property (Japan)
