= Ishidori Matsuri =

Festival

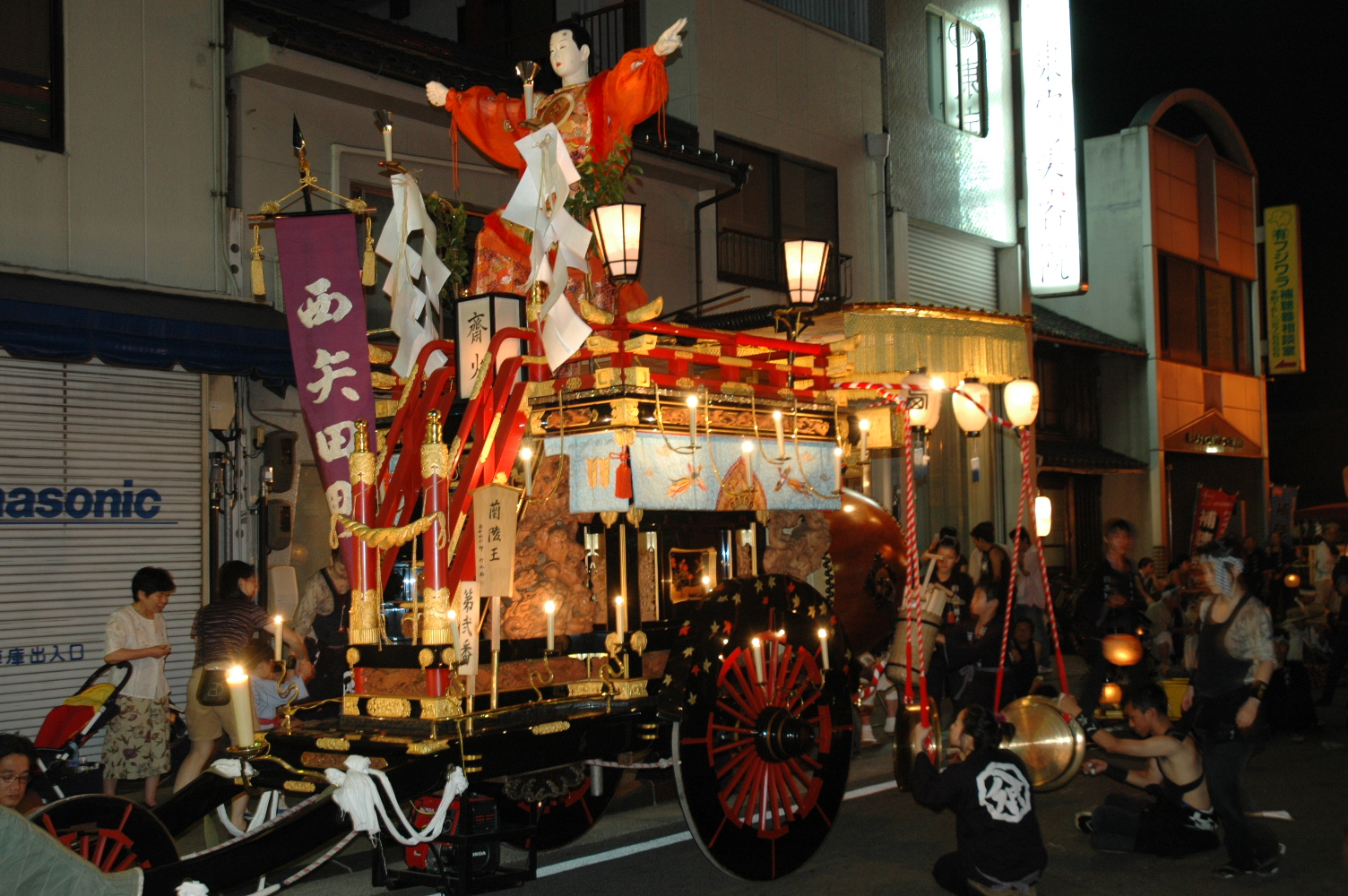
Nishiyada-Machi's Ishidori Matsuri Cart

Ishidori Matsuri (石取祭) can be literally translated from Japanese as "stone bringing festival." It is a festival in Kuwana, located in Mie Prefecture. The festival starts on the first Saturday of August, at midnight, and runs throughout the weekend. Every town within the central part of the city has its own 3 wheeled, highly decorative festival cart. Each cart has a large taiko drum at the back and several kane along the sides. Each town has a particular sequence for each of those instruments, creating a unique and identifying sound. Another identifying feature is the placement of the kakegoe, or shouts. Over the course of the weekend, the carts are pulled toward Kasuga Shrine for presentation, performing along the way. With over 30 carts with distinct rhythms, it has been said that the Kuwana festival is the loudest festival in Japan.

== History ==
The festival originally started in the Edo period (1751-1764). It is believed to have originated from the custom of local worshipers selecting stones from the Machiya River to take to the local shrine. The stones were ceremoniously transported to the shrine on carts, while taiko and kane were played.

In 1981, the festival was designated as an asset of intangible culture for Mie Prefecture. In 2007, it was designated as a national asset of intangible culture.

== Organization and Schedule ==
Typically the towns are separated by age. There is a children's group, young adult group, older adult group, and senior adult group.

Though each town has its own schedule of events and traditions, the following is the generalized schedule of events, with the main event being on the First Sunday of August:
March 6
The order of the carts is determined by lottery.
July 15-20th
This is the practice time with the festival carts. On the 20th, some carts will gather together in one particular town to end the practice session in camaraderie. They can not touch the carts again until Tatakidashi (叩き出し), which is at midnight between Friday night and Saturday morning before the First Sunday of August. Around this time, there is a gender-specific competition between the young adults of each town, though not all towns choose to compete.
July 20
There is a Kawarabarai Ceremony (川原祓式) at Machiya River to pray for a safe festival.
Weekend before the Festival
Each town readies its carts; polishing, cleaning, and setting up components. They also mark the festival path with streamers hanging from telephone lines, and otherwise prepare for the festival, though there is no drumming until Tatakidashi. 3 days before the Festival (Thursday)
Bamboo is gathered to decorate the festival meeting places.
2 days before the Festival (Friday)
Each age group attends their local shrine for the Okattsan Ceremony (お勝さん), which includes singing and praying. The children and adults, with the exception of the young adults, move the cart to its festival position, as was determined in March. Much later, the young adults return to the group after much drinking.
1 day before the Festival (Saturday)
Friday night leads up to Tatakidashi. At midnight, all the towns are signaled to start drumming simultaneously. After playing into the early hours of the morning, the group will retire, typically meeting once more at 10am.
The festival carts are paraded through their towns on this day, and once again it leads up to silence, awaiting the next Tatakidashi.
Festival Day (Sunday)
At 2am, there is another Tatakidashi. The taikos and kane start playing simultaneously and the carts are paraded around their town for another long night of celebration. The day is very similar to the previous one. During the day on Sunday, the young adults drink while once again the others put the cart into its specific order. Later, the young adults join in, and each town makes its way to Kasuga Shrine.

== Participating Towns ==
The following is a list of the current participating towns:
Group 1 - Uehon-Machi (上本町); Hagoromoren (羽衣連) which includes Hon-Machi (本町), Kitahon-Machi (北本町), and Higashisenba-Cho (東舩馬町); Nishisenba-Cho (西舩馬町); and Hanamachiren (花街連) which includes Kawaguchi-Machi (川口町), and Edo-Machi (江戸町)
Group 2 - Miyadori (宮通), Kyo-Machi (京町), Kata-Machi (片町)
Group 3 - Misakidori (三崎通); and Miyakita (宮北) which includes Kitauo-Machi (北魚町), Miya-Machi (宮町), Furo-Machi(風呂町)
Group 4 - Minamiuo-Machi (南魚町), Ta-Machi (田町), and Shokunin-Machi (職人町)
Group 5 - Yotsuya-Cho (吉津屋町), Kaji-Machi (鍜冶町), and Irieyoshi-Machi (入江葭町)
Group 6 - Shin-Machi (新町), Tenma-Cho (傳馬町), and Kaya-Machi (萱町)
Group 7 - Kasuga-Cho (春日町); Shimizu-Cho (清水町); and Takara-Machi (宝町) which includes Hoden-Cho (宝殿町), and Shinhoden-Cho (新宝殿町)
Group 8 - Tera-Machi (寺町)、Tsutsumibara (堤原), Imakata-Machi (今片町), Imanaka-Machi (今中町), and Imakita-Machi (今北町)
Group 9 - Higashinabeya-Machi (東鍋屋町), Nishinabeya-Machi (西鍋屋町), Kakehi (掛樋), Higashiyada-Machi (東矢田町), Nishiyada-Machi (西矢田町), Fukue-Machi (福江町)
Group 10 - Umamichi (馬道); Nishiumamichi (西馬道) which includes Umamichi-Nichome (馬道二丁目), and Umamichi-Sanchome (馬道三丁目); Nishisakae-Machi (西栄町) which includes Sakae-Machi (栄町), and Nishigawara (西川原); Shinyada-ichome (新矢田一丁目); and Ueno-Machi (上野町)
Group 11 - Kotobuki-Cho (寿町), Chuodori (中央通), and Higashitokiwa-Cho (東常盤町)
