= Mibu no Hana Taue =

Rice transplanting ritual in Hiroshima, Japan

Mibu no Hana Taue 壬生の花田植
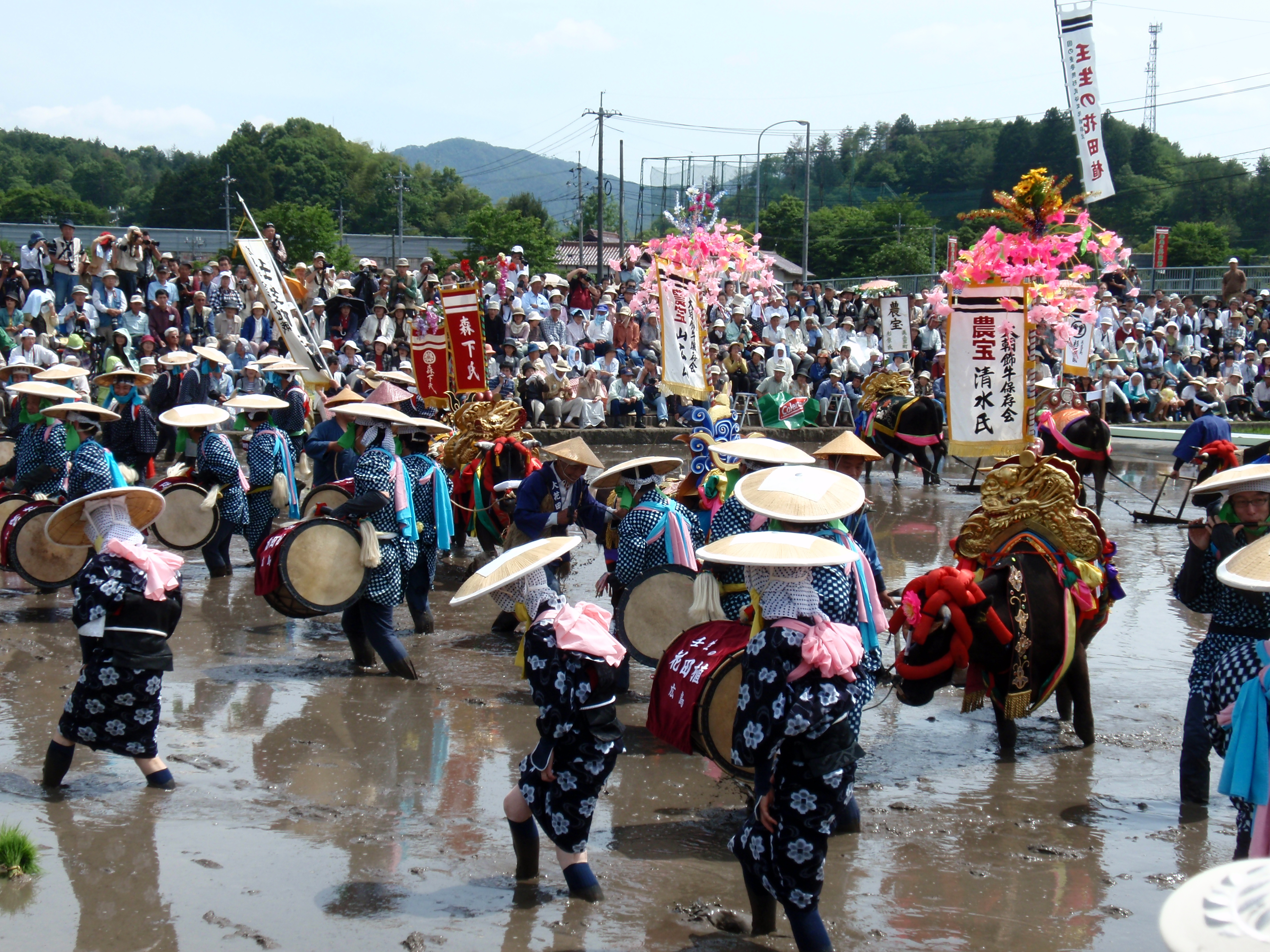
- Genre: Ritual
- Date: First Sunday of June
- Frequency: Annual
- Locations: Kitahiroshima, Japan

Mibu no Hana Taue, ritual of transplanting rice in Mibu, Hiroshima
- UNESCO Intangible Cultural Heritage
- Country: Japan
- Reference: 00411
- Region: Asia and the Pacific

Inscription history
- Inscription: 2011 (6th session)
- List: Representative

Mibu no Hana Taue (壬生の花田植) is ritual of transplanting rice that is held every year on the first Sunday of June in Kitahiroshima, Hiroshima, in hopes of a good harvest. It is a traditional event. It has been designated as an Important Intangible Folk Cultural Property of Japan and is listed in the Representative List of Human Intangible Cultural Heritage of the UNESCO Convention for the Safeguarding of Intangible Cultural Heritage.

== Overview ==
Since the Kamakura period, it has been customary in western Japan for a Saotome to sing a rice planting song while singing a rice planting song, whispering with a large drum, a small drum, a flute, or a hand-made kane, in accordance with the time signature of Sasara. It is a farming ritual to worship Sanbai (Ta-no-Kami) and pray for a good harvest and good harvest, and it is also a device to enjoy the hard labor of rice planting. Eventually, the rice planting event became even more gorgeous by gathering a large number of people, and the cows that were shavings put on a saddle decorated with artificial flowers, and Saotome and others dressed up with red sashes and waistbands to create a day of hare. It is said that it got the name of Hanada Ue because of its gorgeous appearance.

Mibu no Hana Tadashi is the largest rice planting in western Japan, and the "Kawatoda Orchestra" and "Mibu no Hana Tadashi" convey the tradition. In addition, due to its depth of history, it was designated as an important intangible folk cultural property of Japan in 1976, and was registered as a UNESCO intangible cultural heritage in November 2011.
