= Zoni =

Zoni may refer to:

== Places ==
- Zoni, Arcadia, a Greek village
- Zoni, Evros, a Greek village
- Zoni, Kozani, a Greek village
- Agia Zoni, a place on the island of Samos

== Other uses ==
- zōni, Japanese soup with rice cakes (mochi)
- The Zoni, a race of energy beings who appear in the Ratchet & Clank video games
- A slang, sometimes pejorative term for a person from Arizona
