= Buriburi gitcho =

Traditional Japanese children's toys

The buriburi and gitcho were Japanese children's toys, traditionally given together as a New Year's gift. The buriburi was a gourd-shaped roller, with or without wheels, which was rolled along the ground or pulled with a string; the gitcho was a short mallet or bat. Their origin is obscure, but it is believed that they originated from China, and that they were used in a game of the same name. Both the implements and the game were closely associated with the New Year Festival in Heian-era Japan. After the festival, the playing implements were sometimes ceremonially burned in a ceremony known as sagitcho.
