= Jūbako =

Japanese food box

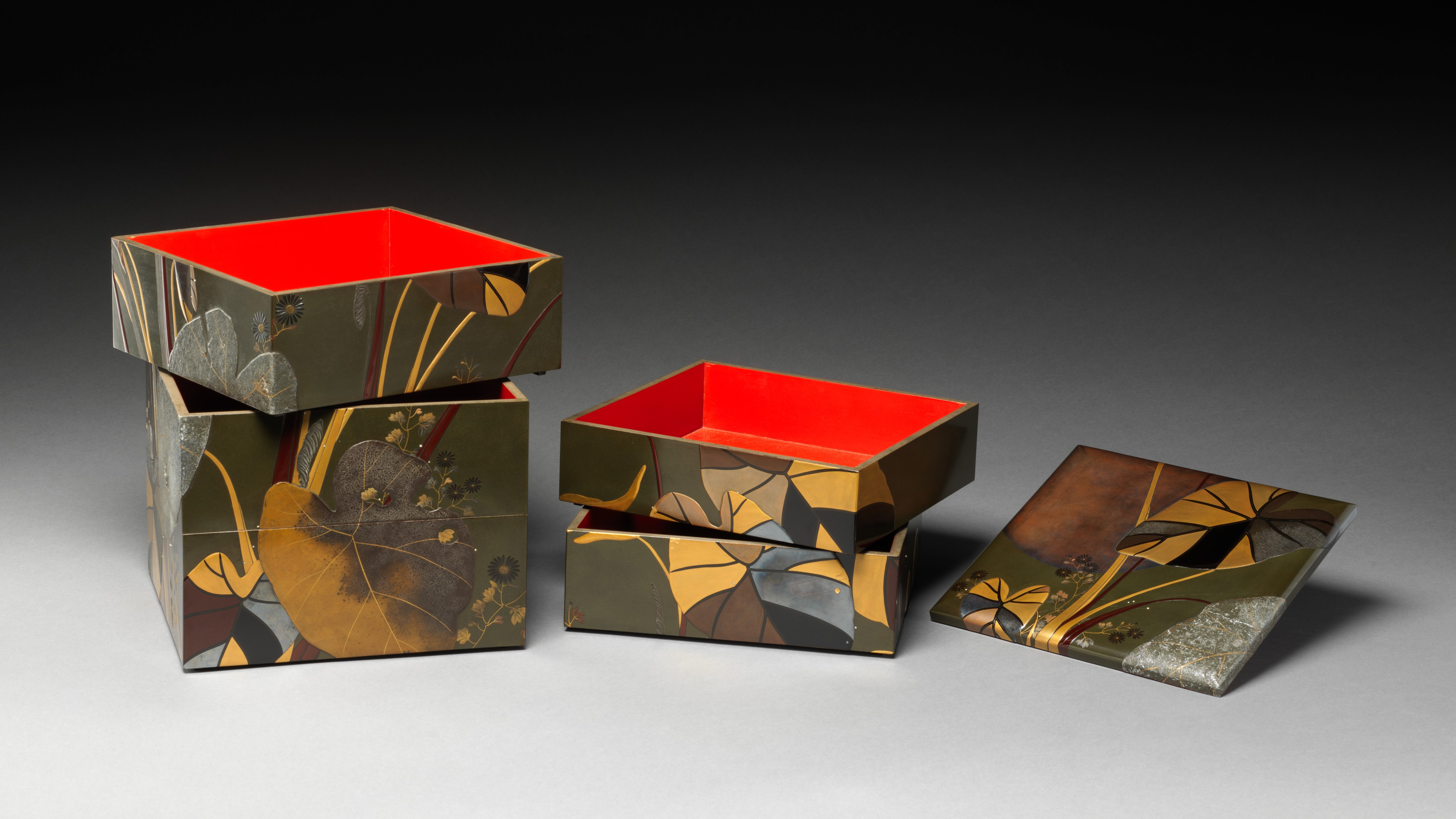
Mid-19th century jūbako by Shibata Zeshin, housed at the Metropolitan Museum of Art of New York

Jūbako (重箱; lit. 'tiered boxes'), or rarely kasanebako (重箱), are tiered lacquerware boxes used to hold and present food in Japan. The boxes are often used to hold osechi, foods traditional to the Japanese New Year, or to hold takeaway lunches, or bento.

Jūbako are traditionally made of wood, generally lacquered, coming in sets designed to stack two, three, or even more layers high. Often square, jūbako may also come in different shapes. A set usually comes with a lid for the top layer.

A sagejūbako (提げ重箱, lit. "portable jūbako"), or, for short, a sagejū (提重), is a picnic set of jūbako in a carrier with a handle.

There is also jikirō (食籠, lit. "food basket"), a kind of Chinese-styled bowl, some stackable like jūbako.

== Gallery ==
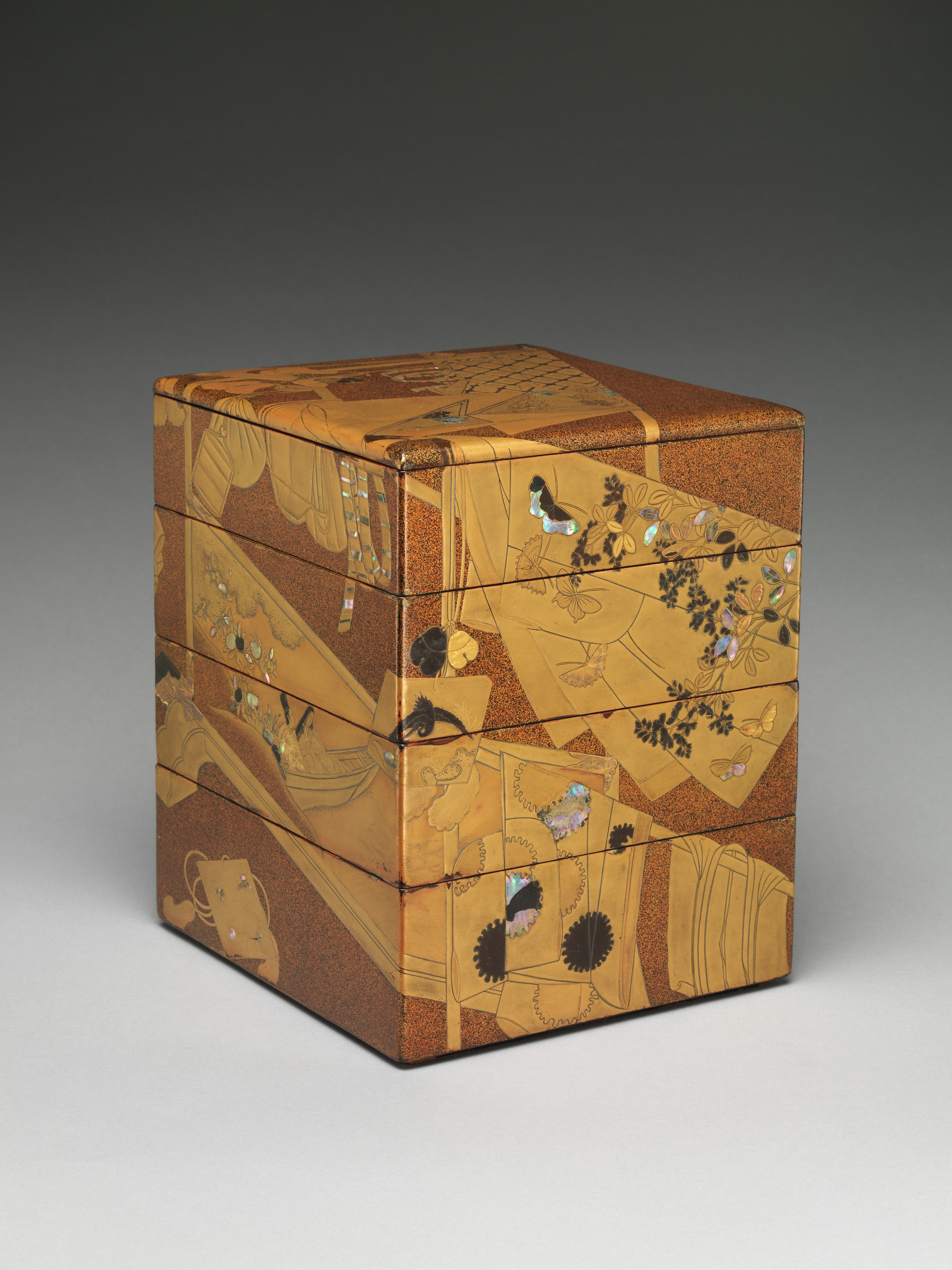
An 18th-century wood, gold, and silver foil jūbako

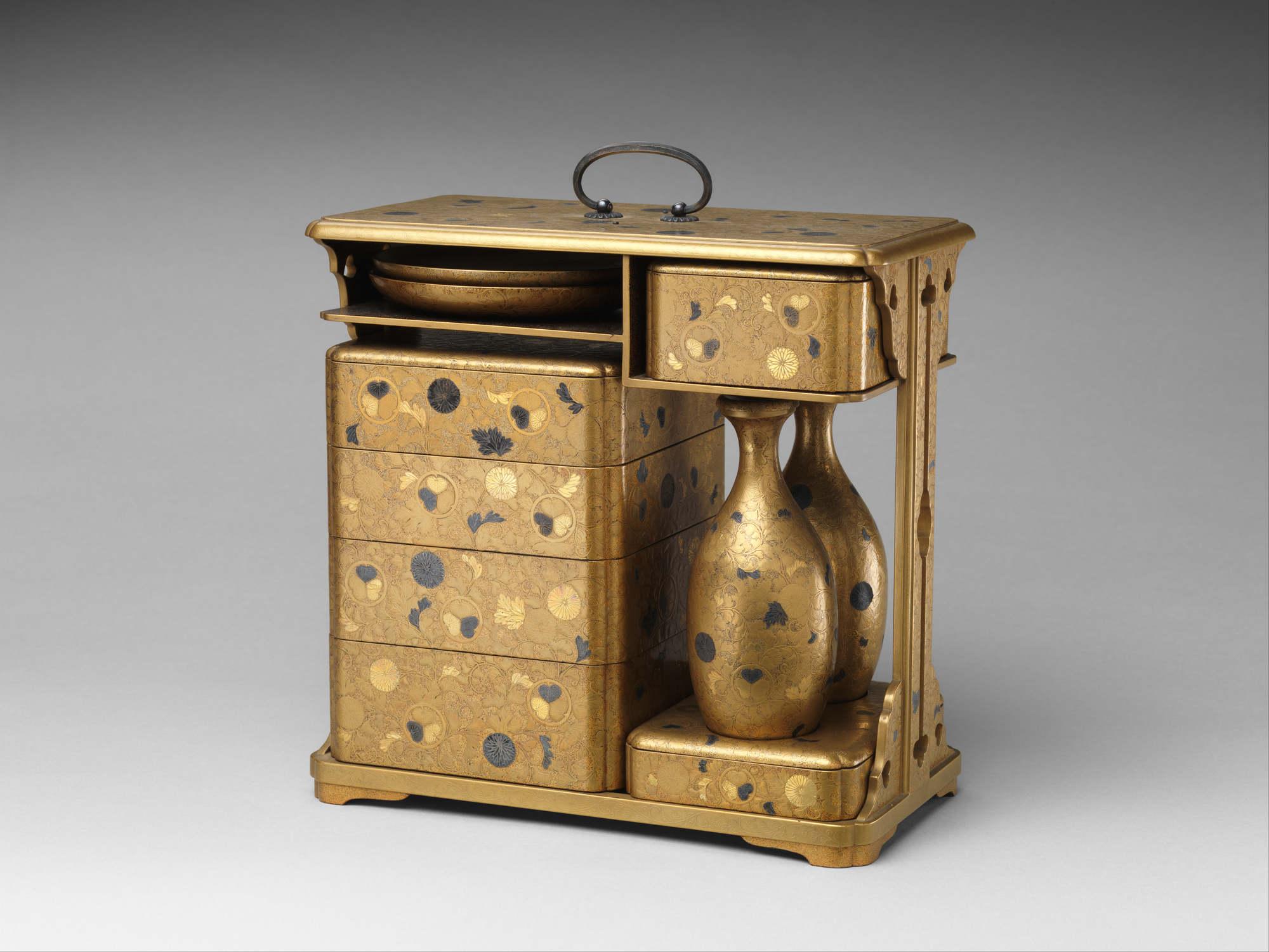
Sagejū

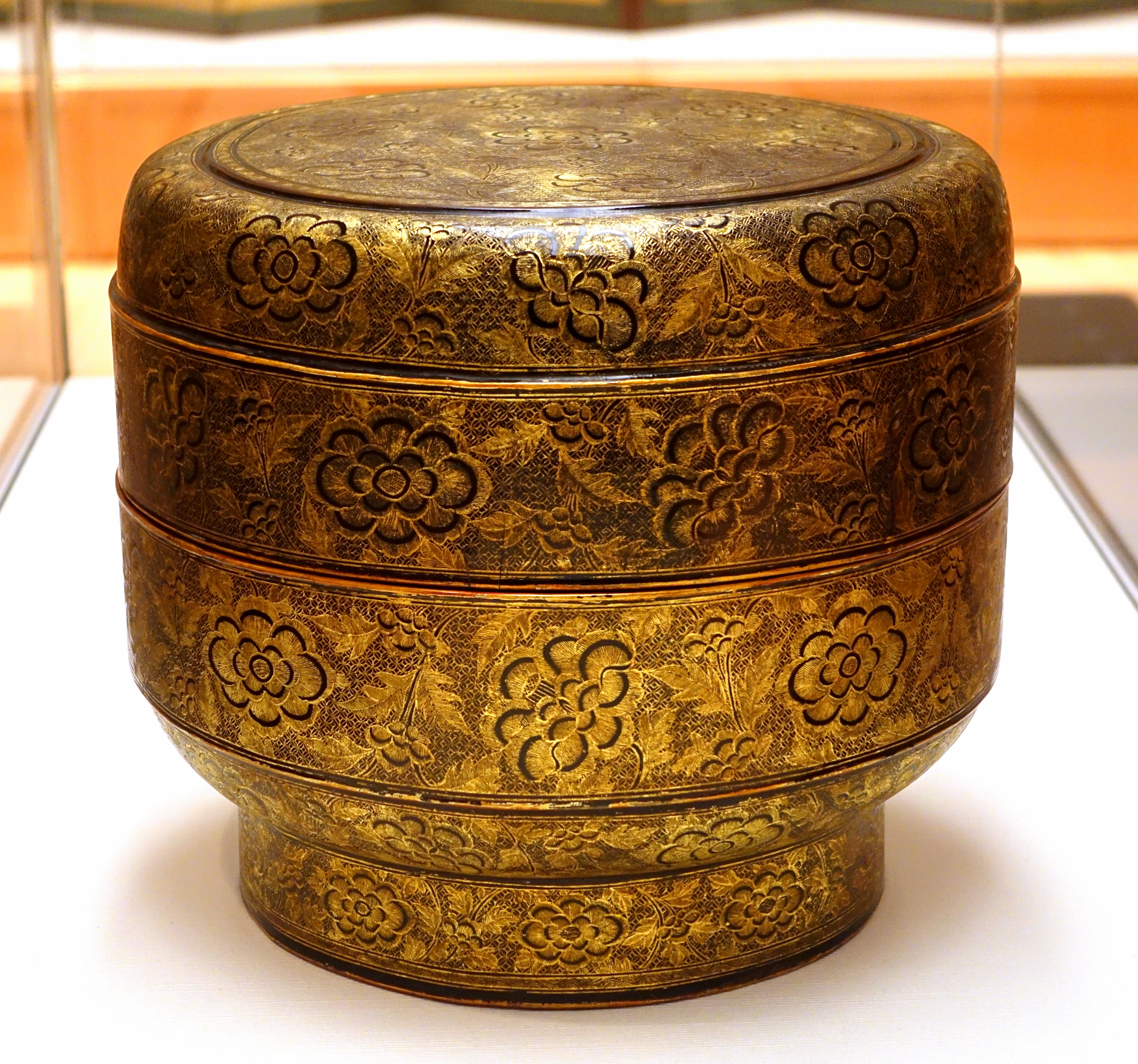
Jikirō

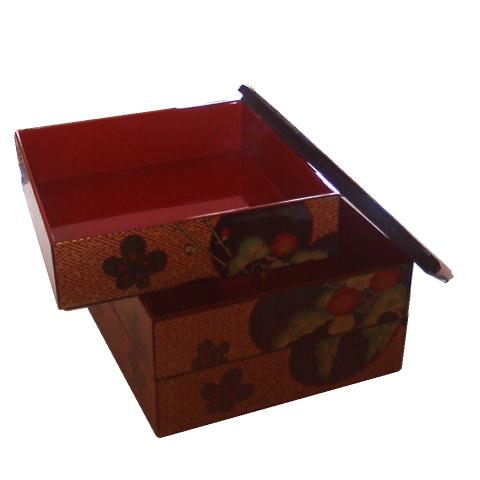
Square box

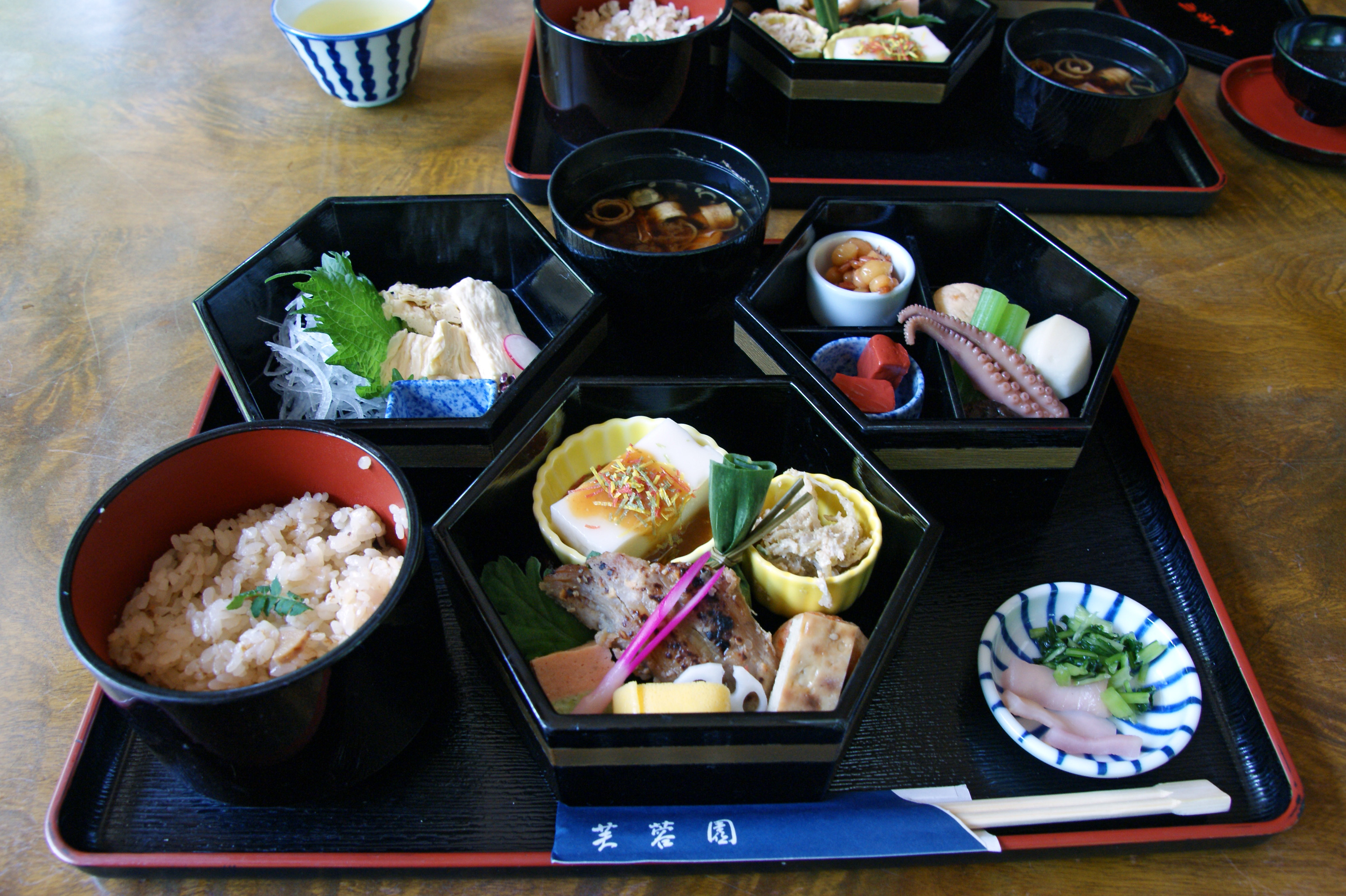
Hexagonal box

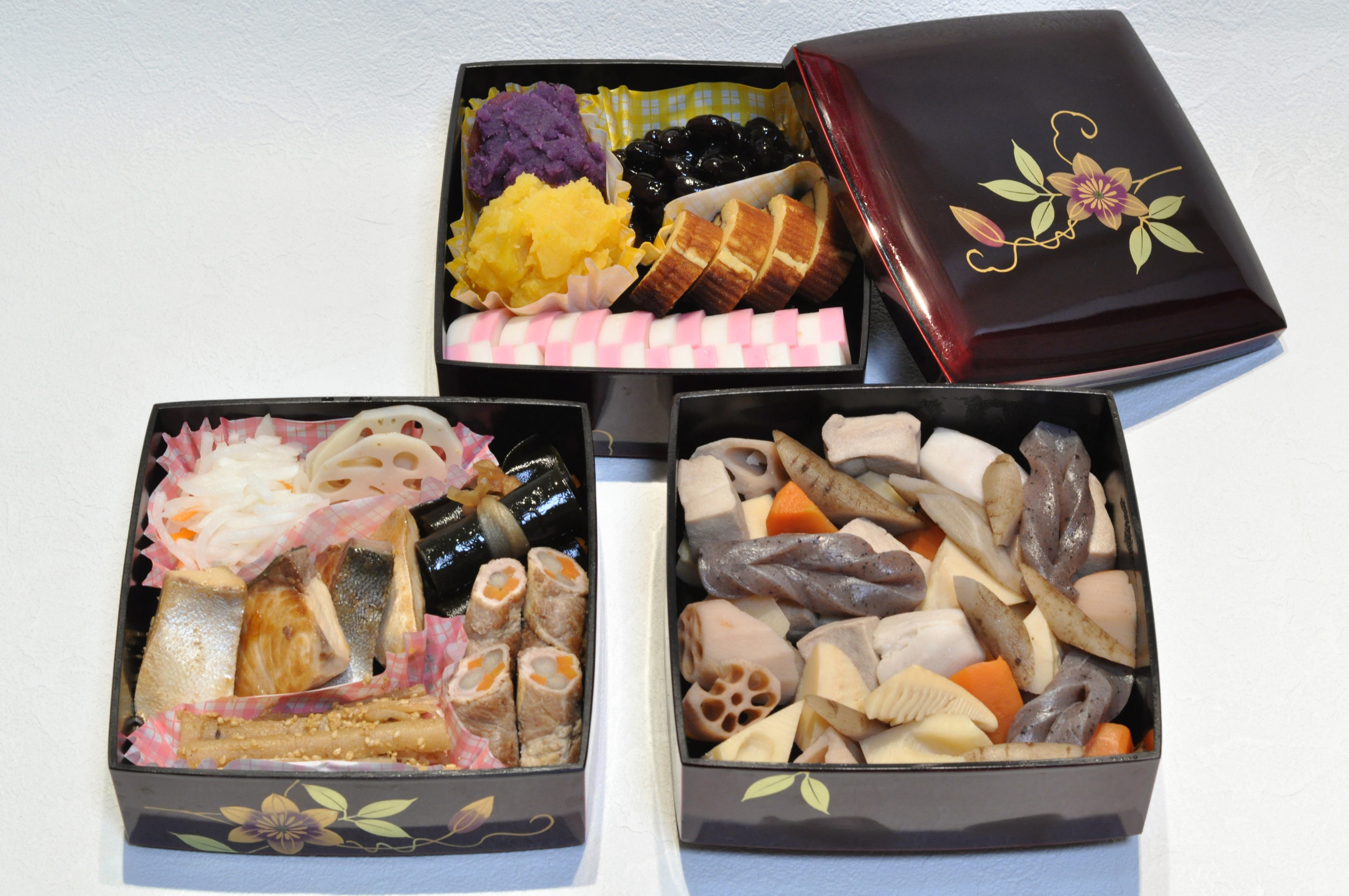
Osechi dishes in a box

== See also ==
- Tiffin carrier: tiered lunchbox of India, Pakistan and the Caribbean
