= Ōmisoka =

Annual Japanese festival

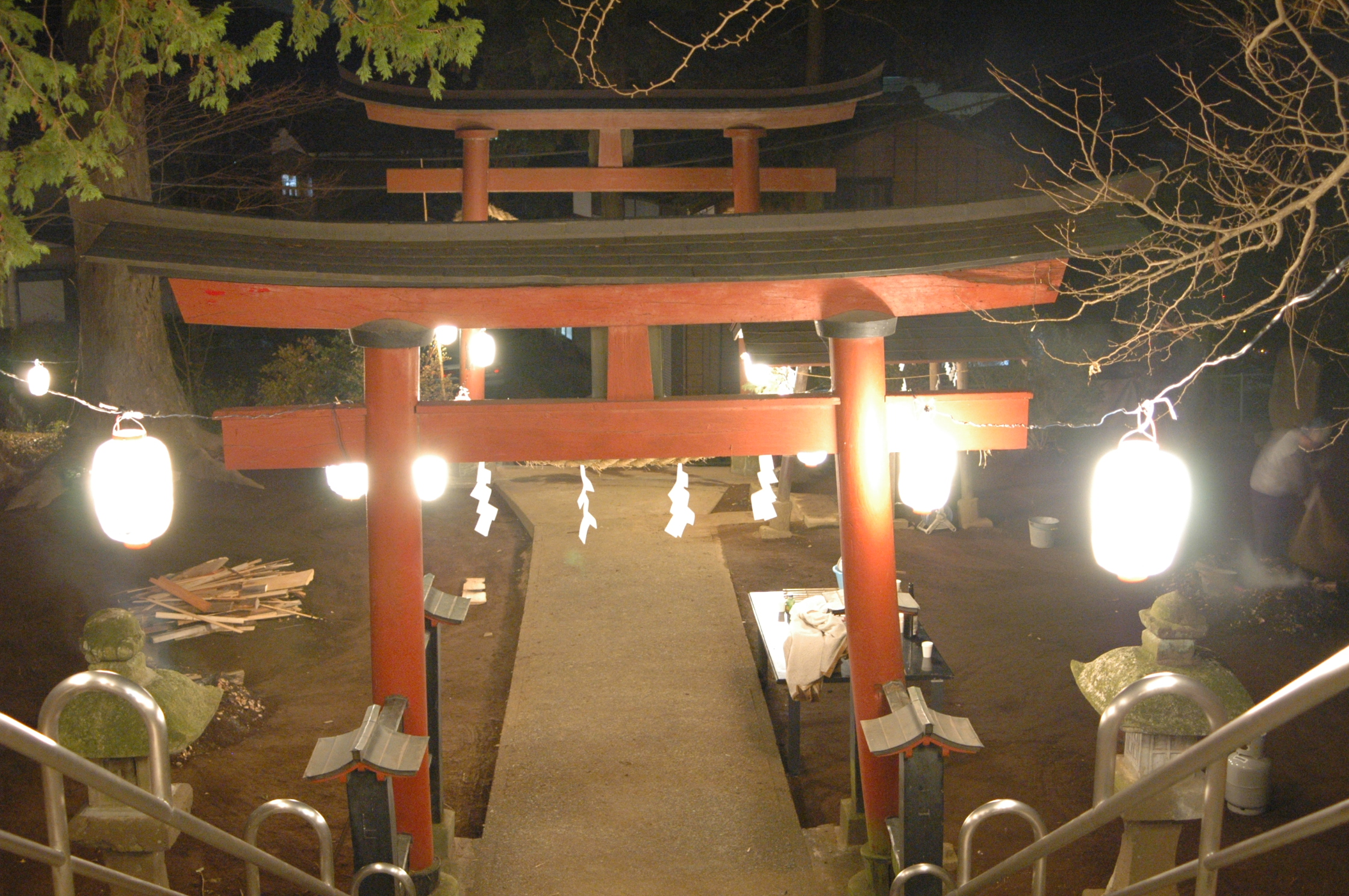
- Shinto shrine on ōmisoka
- Official name: 大晦日
- Also called: New Year's Eve
- Observed by: Japan
- Type: Cultural
- Significance: Preparing for the new year
- Celebrations: Kōhaku Uta Gassen
- Date: December 31
- Next time: 31 December 2026
- Frequency: Annual
- Related to: Japanese New Year; New Year's Eve

Ōmisoka (大晦日) or ōtsugomori (大晦) is a Japanese traditional celebration on the last day of the year. Traditionally, it was held on the final day of the 12th lunar month. With Japan's switch to using the Gregorian calendar at the beginning of the Meiji era, it is now used on New Year's Eve to celebrate the new year.

== Origins ==
=== Etymology ===
The last day of each month of the Japanese lunisolar calendar was historically named misoka (晦日). Originally, "miso" was written as 三十, indicating the 30th day, though misoka sometimes fell on the 29th due to the varying lengths of the lunar month. The last day in the 12th lunar month is called ōmisoka (大晦日)—with the 大 indicating it is the final last day of the month for that year—or the "great thirtieth day". As part of the Meiji Restoration, Japan switched to the Gregorian calendar in 1873, and ōmisoka was set as December 31, or New Year's Eve. The day is also known by the archaic pronunciation of ōtsugomori (大晦). This is a shortened version of tsukigomori (月隠り), meaning "last day of the month".

=== Activities ===
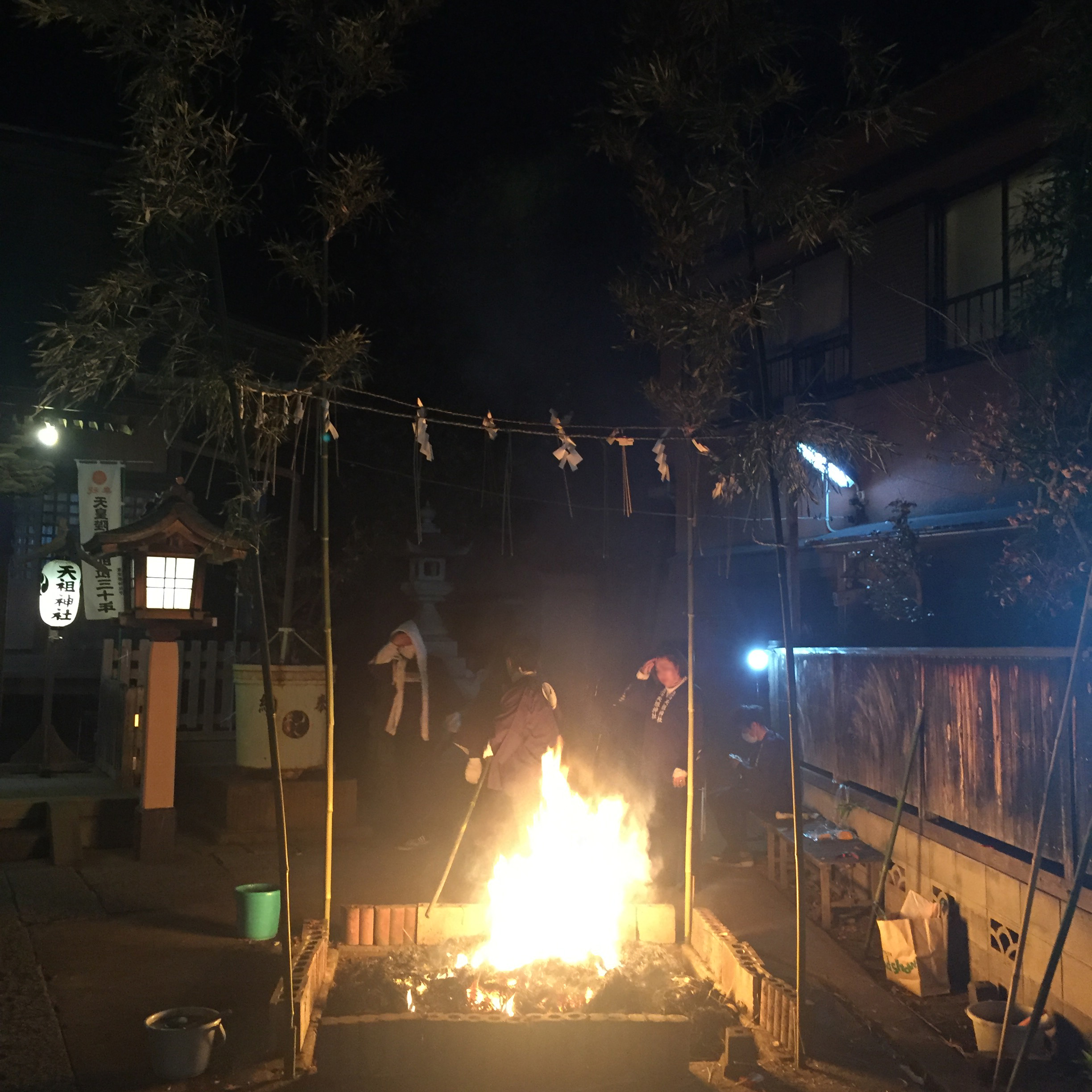
Otakiage, a ritual bonfire in a shrine

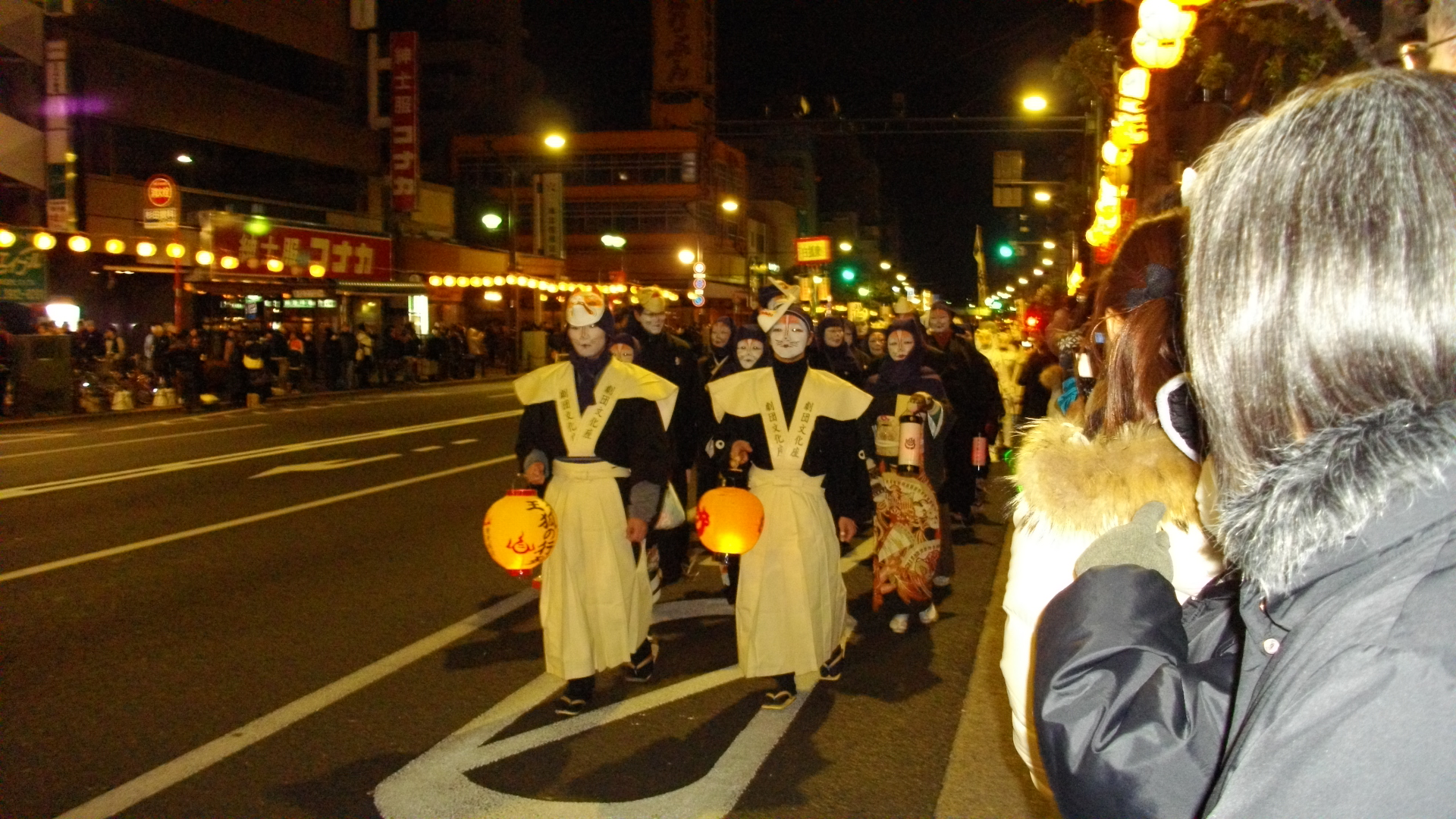
Kitsune no Gyoretsu (Ōji 2010)

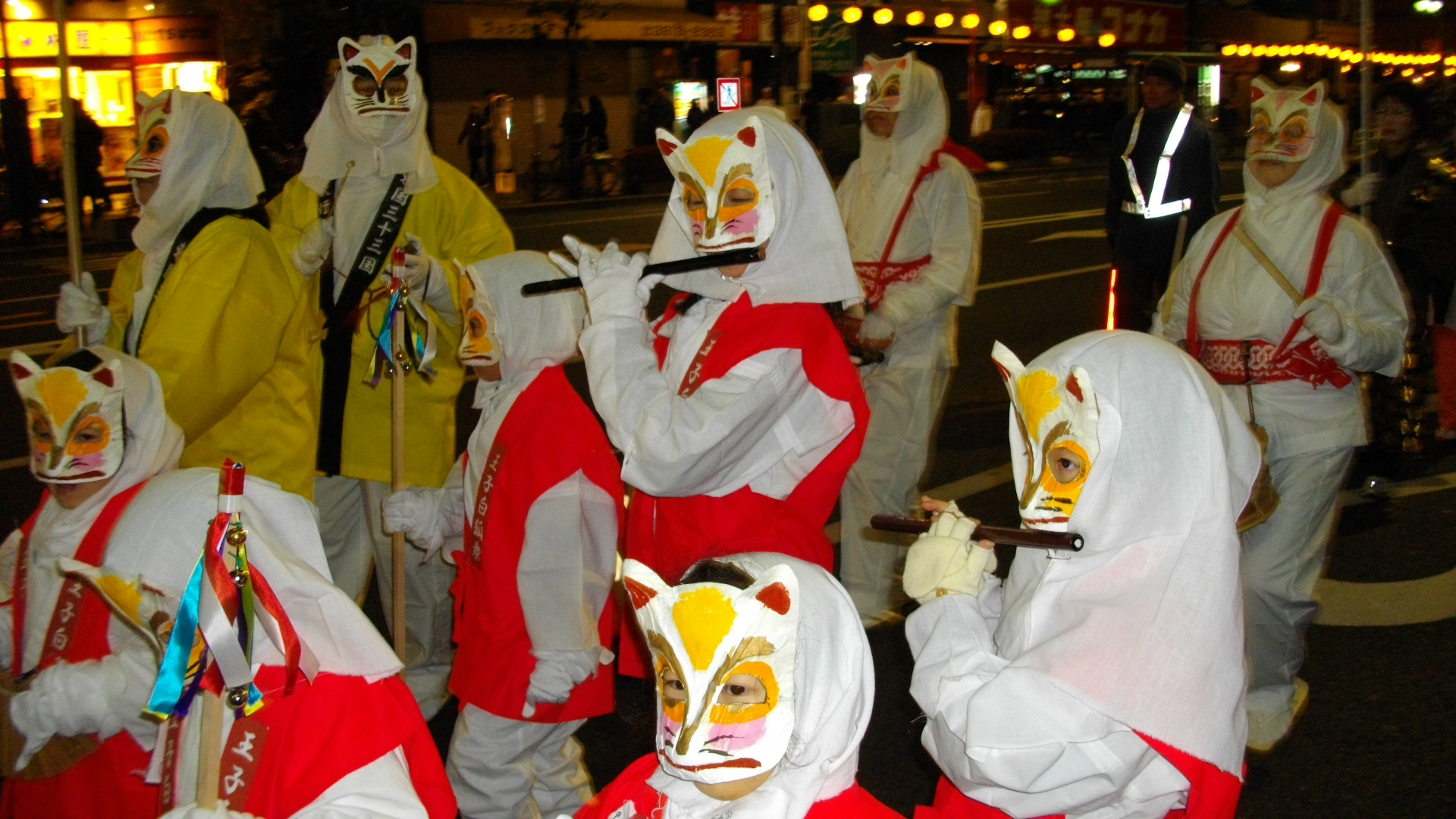
Kitsune no Gyoretsu (Ōji 2010)

Traditionally, important activities for the concluding year and day were completed in order to start the new year fresh. Some of these include house cleaning, repaying debts, purification (such as driving out evil spirits and bad luck), and bathing so the final hours of the year could be spent relaxing. Recently, families and friends often gather for parties, including the viewing of the over four-hour Kōhaku Uta Gassen (紅白歌合戦; "Red/White Singing Battle") on NHK, or more recently to watch large mixed martial arts cards. This custom has its roots in the ancient Japanese culture surrounding toshigamisama (歳神様) or toshitokusama (歳徳様), which revolved around the practice of showing reverence toward the gods of the current and upcoming years.

About an hour before the New Year, people often gather together for one last time in the old year to have a bowl of toshikoshi soba or toshikoshi udon together—a tradition based on people's association of eating the long noodles with "crossing over from one year to the next", which is the meaning of toshi-koshi. While the noodles are often eaten plain, or with chopped scallions, in some localities people top them with tempura. Traditionally, families make osechi on the last few days of the year. The food is then consumed during the first several days of the new year in order to "[welcome] the 'deity of the year' to each household" and "[wish] for happiness throughout the year".

At midnight, many visit a shrine or temple for Hatsumōde, or the first shrine/temple visit of the year. Throughout Japan, Shinto shrines prepare amazake to pass out to crowds that gather as midnight approaches. Most Buddhist temples have a large bonshō (Buddhist bell) that is struck once for each of the 108 earthly temptations believed to cause human suffering. The bell ringing tradition is known as joya no kane (除夜の鐘).

When seeing someone for the last time before the new year, it is traditional to say "Yoi o-toshi wo" (良いお年を; lit. "Have a good New Year"). The traditional first greeting after the beginning of the New Year is "Akemashite omedetō (明けましておめでとう; lit. "congratulations on the new year").

This celebration is the equivalent of New Year's Eve in the Western world, and coincides with Saint Sylvester's Day celebrated by some Western Christian churches.

== See also ==
- List of Buddhist festivals
- Japanese New Year
- Toshikoshi soba
