= Osechi =

Assortment of foods celebrating Japanese New Year

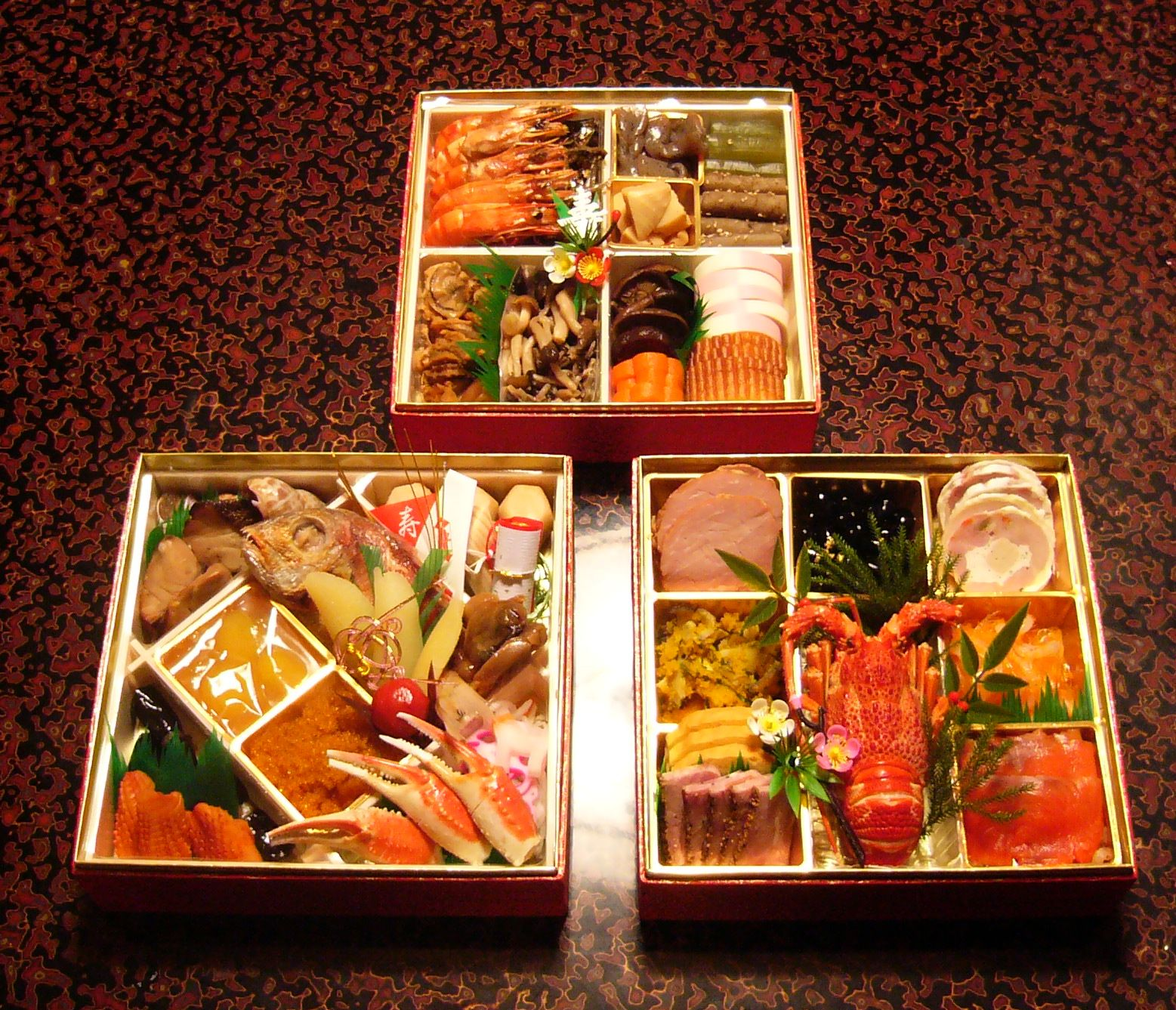
An example of osechi-ryōri

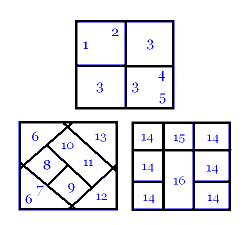
Legend: 1: Simmered shrimp, 2: Tazukuri, 3: Nishime Cooked vegetables, 4: Kamaboko, 5: Datemaki, 6: appetizer, 7: Konbumaki, 8:Kurikinton, 9: Tobiko, 10: Grilled sea bream, 11: Kazunoko, 12: Pickled vegetables, 13: Sweets, 14: appetizer, 15: Black beans, 16: Grilled lobster

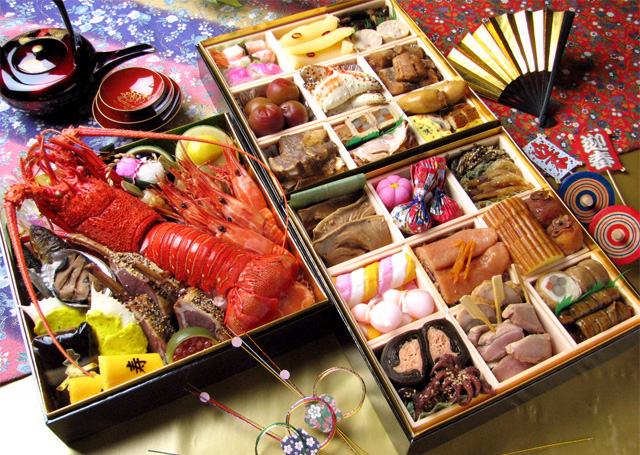
Another example of osechi in three-tiered box

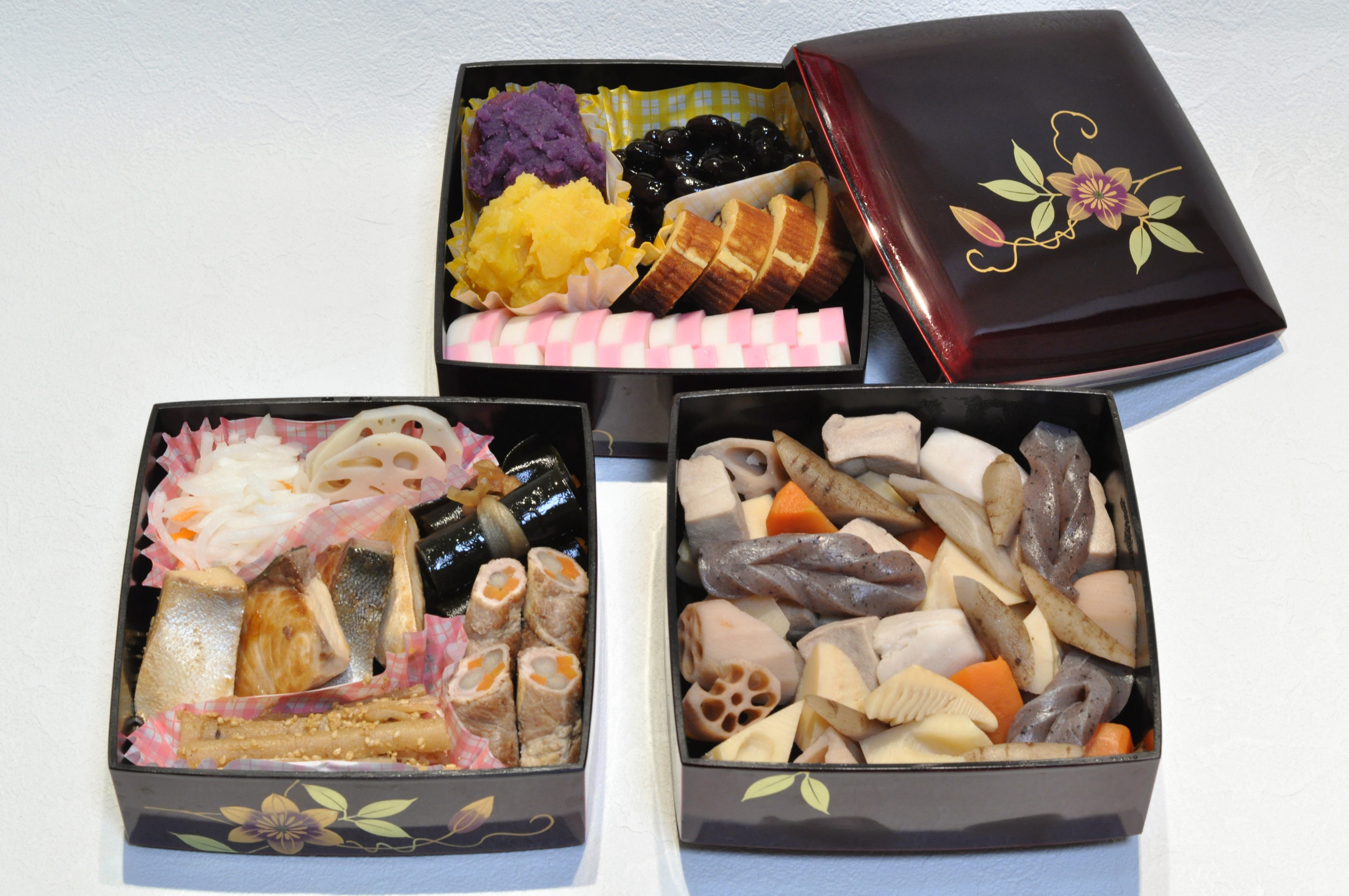
Another example of osechi, casual type

Osechi-ryōri (御節料理, お節料理 or おせち) are traditional Japanese New Year foods. Osechi are easily recognizable by their special boxes called jūbako (重箱), which resemble bentō boxes. Like bentō boxes, jūbako are often kept stacked before and after use. Not all parts of Japan, such as Suzu in Ishikawa, practice the custom of eating osechi.

Osechi is a food eaten to wish the family good health for the year, and the various dishes that make up osechi have their own roles to bring good luck in terms of longevity, prosperity of descendants, a bountiful harvest, success in life, and financial success.

Originally, osechi was rice served high in a bowl to celebrate the five annual ceremonies (gosekku) from the Nara (610–794) to Kamakura periods (1185–1333). Osechi is influenced by the ritual of naorai (also known as kyōshoku), in which a person who prays eats with the Shinto kami. The old custom of offering osechi to the toshigami (Shinto deity) on the kamidana (household Shinto altar) before eating it with the family is a remnant of this ceremony.

Osechi changed greatly under the influence of honzen-ryōri, a banquet dish that was ritualized in daimyo (feudal lords) and the samurai society during the Muromachi period (1336–1573). Many of the standard dishes that make up osechi today are derived from honzen-ryōri.

During the Edo period (1603–1868), osechi came to refer only to New Year's dishes. With the economic development of Japanese society, the custom of osechi spread to the general public, the chōnin class, and a new custom began. From the late Edo period, some of the dishes in osechi began to be packed in jūbako, and from the Meiji era (1868–1912) to the Showa era (1912–1989), the variety of dishes packed in jūbako increased, becoming a luxurious product sold in department stores.

== Examples of osechi dishes ==
The dishes that make up osechi each have a special meaning celebrating the New Year. Some examples are:

- Daidai (橙, だいだい), Japanese bitter orange. Daidai is also a homophone meaning "from generation to generation" when written in different kanji as 代々. Like kazunoko below, it symbolizes a wish for children in the New Year.
- Datemaki (伊達巻 or 伊達巻き or だてまき), sweet rolled omelette mixed with fish paste or mashed shrimp. They symbolize a wish for many auspicious days. On auspicious days (晴れの日, hare-no-hi), Japanese people traditionally wear fine clothing as a part of enjoying themselves. One of the meanings associated with the second kanji includes "fashionability", derived from the illustrious dress of the samurai from the Date clan.
- Kamaboko (蒲鉾, かまぼこ), broiled fish cake. Traditionally, slices of red and white kamaboko are alternated in rows or arranged in a pattern. The color and shape are reminiscent of the Japanese rising sun, and have a celebratory, festive meaning.
- Kazunoko (数の子, かずのこ), herring roe. Kazu means "number" and ko means "child". It symbolizes a wish for numerous children in the New Year.
- Konbu (昆布), a kind of seaweed. It is considered to sound like the word yorokobu (喜ぶ), meaning "joy".
- Kuro-mame (黒豆, くろまめ), black soybeans. Mame also means "health", symbolizing a wish for health in the New Year.
- Kōhaku-namasu (紅白なます), literally "red-white vegetable kuai", is made of daikon and carrot cut into thin strips and pickled in sweetened vinegar with yuzu flavor.
- Tai (鯛, たい), red sea-bream. Tai is associated with the Japanese word medetai, meaning auspicious, as to welcome auspicious events for the new year.
- Tazukuri (田作り), dried sardines cooked in soy sauce. The literal meaning of the kanji in tazukuri is "rice paddy maker", as the fish were used historically to fertilize rice fields. The symbolism is of an abundant harvest next year.
- Zōni (雑煮), a soup of mochi rice cakes in clear broth (in eastern Japan) or miso broth (in western Japan).
- Ebi (海老, えび), skewered prawns cooked with sake and soy sauce. It symbolizes a wish for a long life, suggesting a long beard and bent waist.
- Nishiki tamago (錦卵/二色玉子), egg roulade; the egg is separated before cooking, yellow symbolizing gold, and white symbolizing silver, both of these together symbolising wealth and good fortune.
- Zenzai is a hot dessert soup made of sweet red beans and often served with toasted rice cakes (mochi) or smaller shiratama dango (mini rice cakes). It is similar to shiruko.

== History ==
The term osechi is derived from the term o-setchiku (御節供), which originally referred to annual imperial court events and the food served at these events. New Year's Day was one of the five annual ceremonies (gosekku) in the Imperial Court in Kyoto. This custom of celebrating particular days was introduced from China into Japan.

The osechi of the Nara (710–794) and Heian periods (794–1185) were quite different from those of today. Osechi of those periods consisted of rice served high in bowls that the emperor served to court officials on the five annual ceremonies of the year. The officials would ceremonially eat a small portion of the rice at court and then take it home to eat with their families. Osechi is believed to have been influenced by the Shinto ritual of naorai (kyōshoku). Naorai is a ritual of eating with the kami in order to offer prayers to them. Examples of this ritual are the emperor's enthronement ceremony, Daijōsai, and the old custom of eating osechi after offering it to the altar of the kamidana (household Shinto altar).

Even after the samurai class came to power in the Kamakura period (1185–1333), osechi consisted of rice served high in bowls.

Osechi changed greatly under the influence of honzen-ryōri, a banquet dish that was ritualized in daimyo (feudal lords) and the samurai society during the Muromachi period (1336–1573). Many of the standard dishes that make up osechi today are derived from honzen-ryōri. The three main foods known as iwaizakana (festive side dishes), such as kuromame (sugar-boiled black soybeans), tazukuri (dried Japanese anchovy), and tataki gobo (burdock boiled in vinegar and soy sauce), which are essential to today's osechi, were originally served as snacks with sake in honzen-ryōri. Kamaboko, datamaki, and kuri kinton (chestnuts wagashi), the staples of modern osechi, were also originally honzen-ryōri, and guests would take them home to eat after the banquet. During this period, carp was the most common fish dish for osechi.

During the Edo period (1603–1868), the term "osechi" came to refer only to New Year's foods. During this period, Japan experienced dramatic economic development and merchants became wealthy, and osechi became part of the culture of the chōnin (townspeople) class from the Genroku era (1688–1704) onward, and honzen-ryōri became popular among the general public. Osechi came to include a variety of dishes seasoned mainly with salt. Pagrus major replaced carp as the most common fish dish. Zōni appeared in the Muromachi period (1336–1573) as a snack at wedding banquets of the upper samurai class and became a New Year's dish for the common people during this period.

During this period, osechi consisted of two main components: honzen-ryōri (a main dish consisting of rice, fish, and nimono simmered dish), and kuitsumi a New Year's decoration. The kuitsumi consisted of rice placed on three sides of a white wooden stand decorated with mochi, abalone, kombu, chestnuts, persimmons, Japanese spiny lobster, mikan, pine, bamboo, and plum, etc. It was eaten on New Year's Day with guests who came to greet the New Year, or pretended to be eaten as a ceremonial ritual.

In the late Edo period, osechi began to be placed in jūbako (tiered boxes) like today's osechi. In the Kanto region, kuromame, kazunoko (eggs of the Pacific herring), and tazukuri were placed in stacked boxes, while in the Kansai region, kuromame, tazukuri, and tataki gobo were the three main ingredients of osechi.

During the Meiji era (1868–1912), various dishes that were originally honzen-ryōri, such as kamaboko, datamaki, kuri kinton and nimono, began to be placed in jūbako. With the modernization of Japanese society, women's schools were established and osechi was taught as a dishs that housewives should master. The various regional styles of osechi that had existed until then were gradually standardized throughout the country.

With Japan's rapid economic development after World War II, osechi became more luxurious and was sold in department stores, and some of the dishes began to incorporate yōshoku (Western-style foods).

== See also ==
- Toso
