= Sagitcho =

Sagitcho was an element of the New Year festivities in Japan during the Heian period. It involved burning the paraphernalia of the festival, including fans, pine branches and poems, on a pyre constructed from three tied bamboo rods. It took place on January 15. The burning ceremony was the climax of the festival in imperial Kyoto, and usually took place within the Imperial Palace, in the Shinsen-en gardens.
