= Toshikoshi soba =

Noodle dish eaten in Japan on New Year's Eve

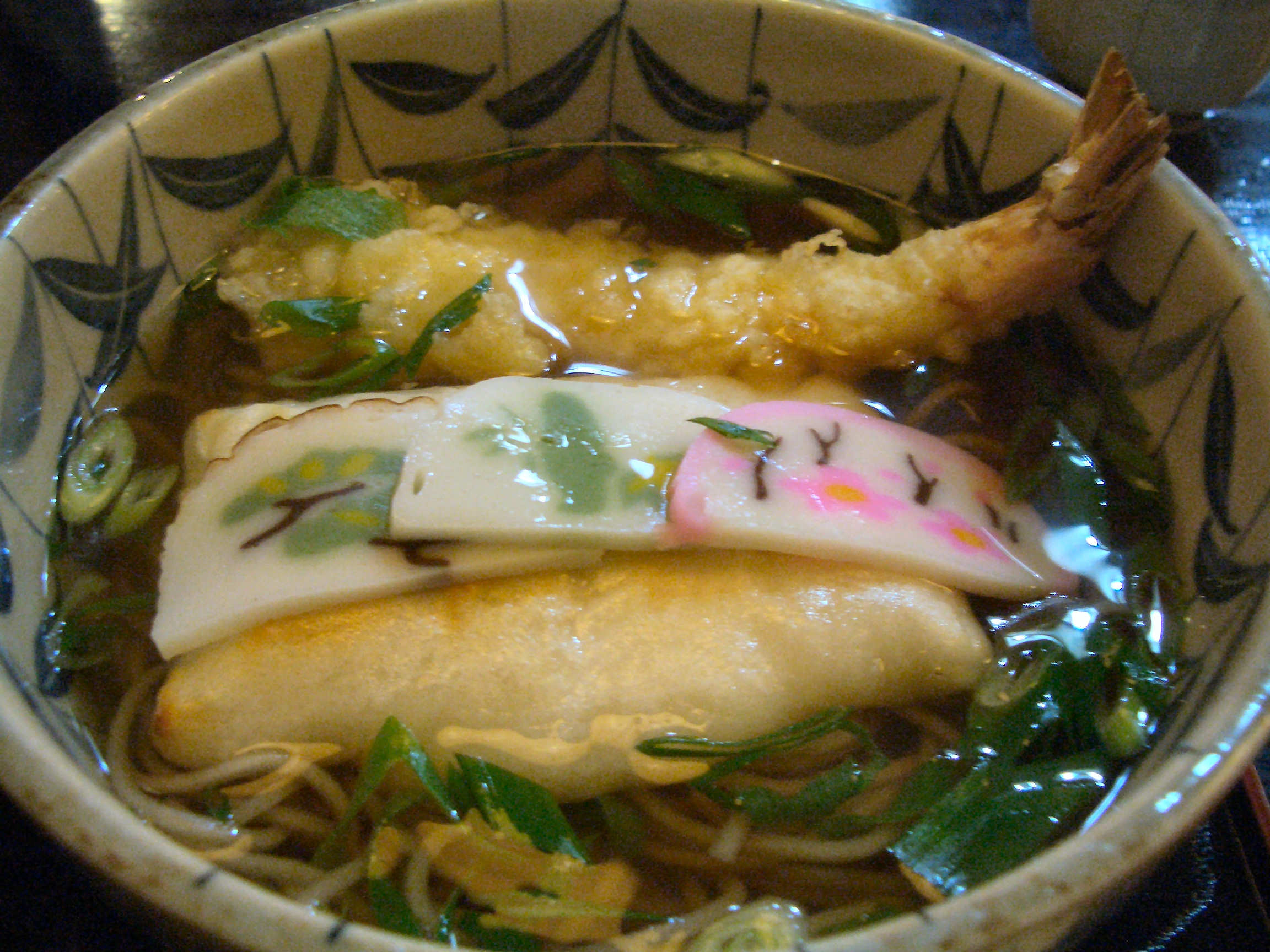
- Toshikoshi soba with kamaboko
- Alternative names: misoka soba, tsugomori soba, kure soba, jumyō soba, fuku soba, unki soba
- Type: Noodle soup
- Place of origin: Japan
- Associated cuisine: Japanese cuisine

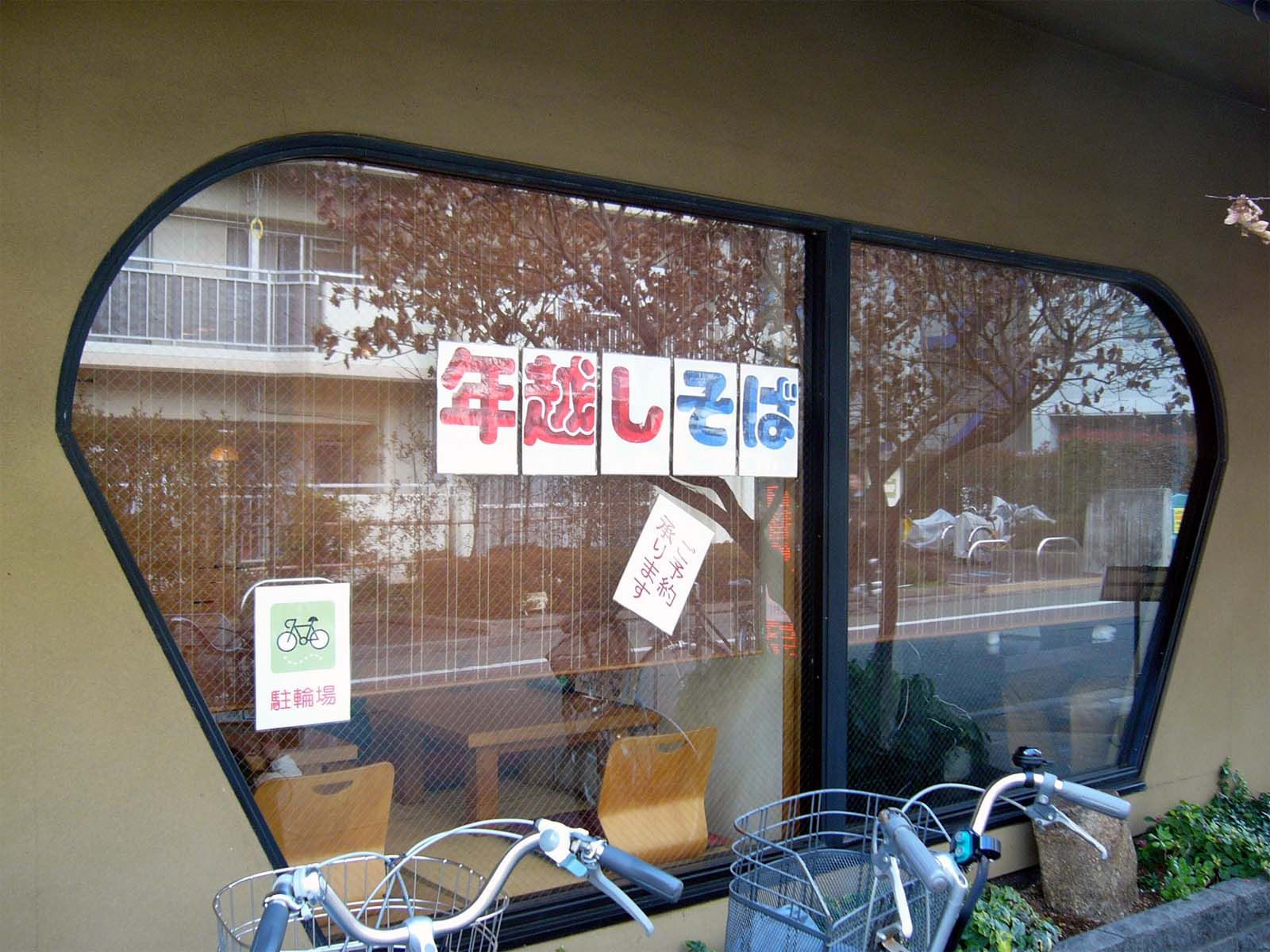
Toshikoshi-soba(年越し蕎麦), soba-shop(蕎麦店), Tokyo, Japan.

Toshikoshi soba (年越し蕎麦) is a traditional Japanese noodle bowl dish eaten on ōmisoka (New Year's Eve, 31 December).

This custom is intended to enable the household to let go of the year’s hardship because soba noodles are easily cut while eating.

== History ==
The custom differs from area to area and it is also called misoka soba, tsugomori soba, kure soba, jumyō soba, fuku soba, and unki soba. (Note: In Japanese misoka, tsugomori, and kure all here designate New Year's Eve; jumyō means lifespan; fuku and unki both means happiness.) The tradition started around the Edo period (1603-1867), and there are several traditions that long soba noodles symbolize a long life. The buckwheat plant can survive severe weather during its growth period, and so soba represents strength and resilience.

== See also ==
- Ōmisoka, the Japanese New Year's Eve
- Japanese cuisine
