= Zōni =

Japanese soup

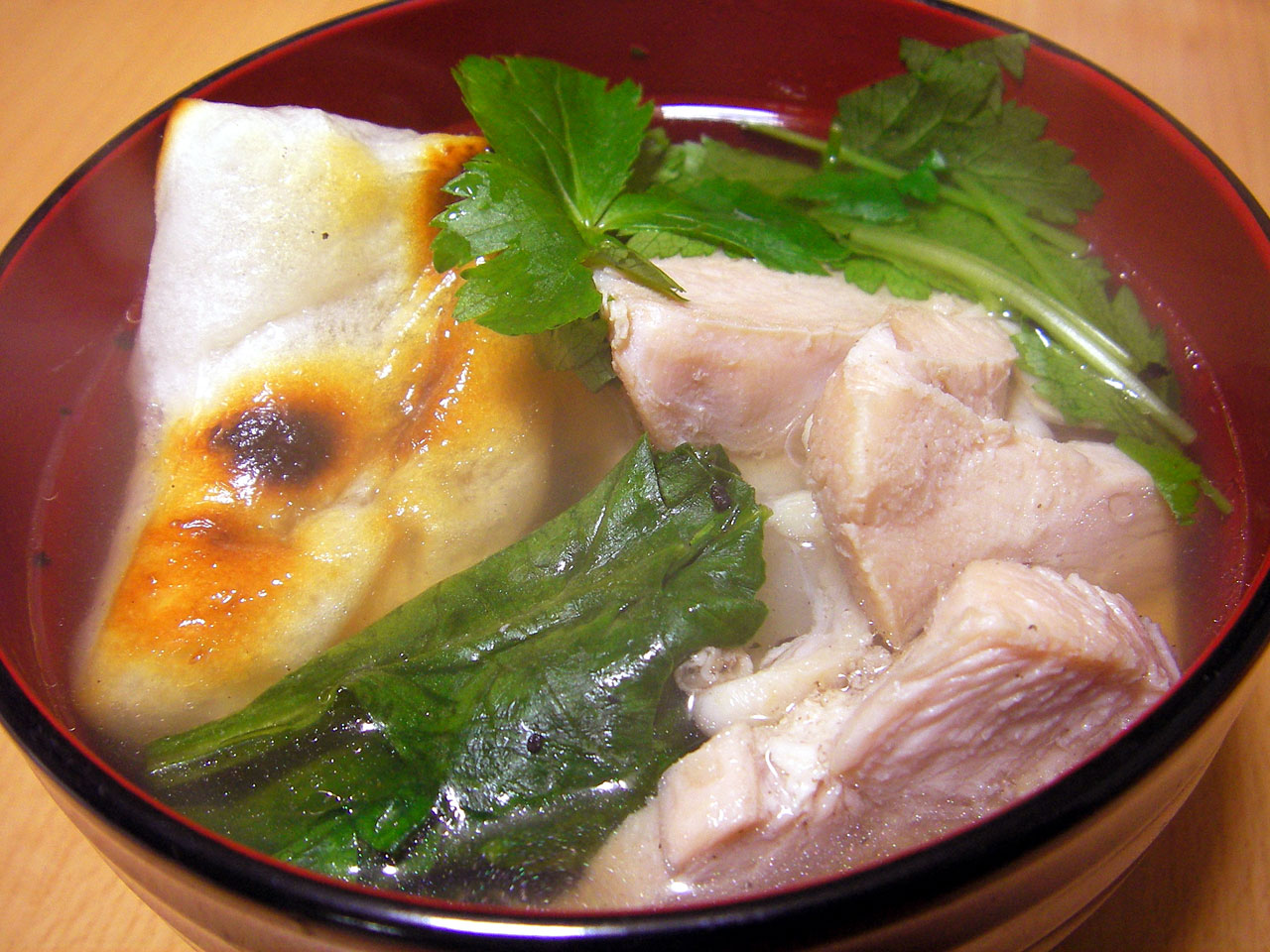
- Type: Soup
- Place of origin: Japan
- Main ingredients: mochi rice cakes

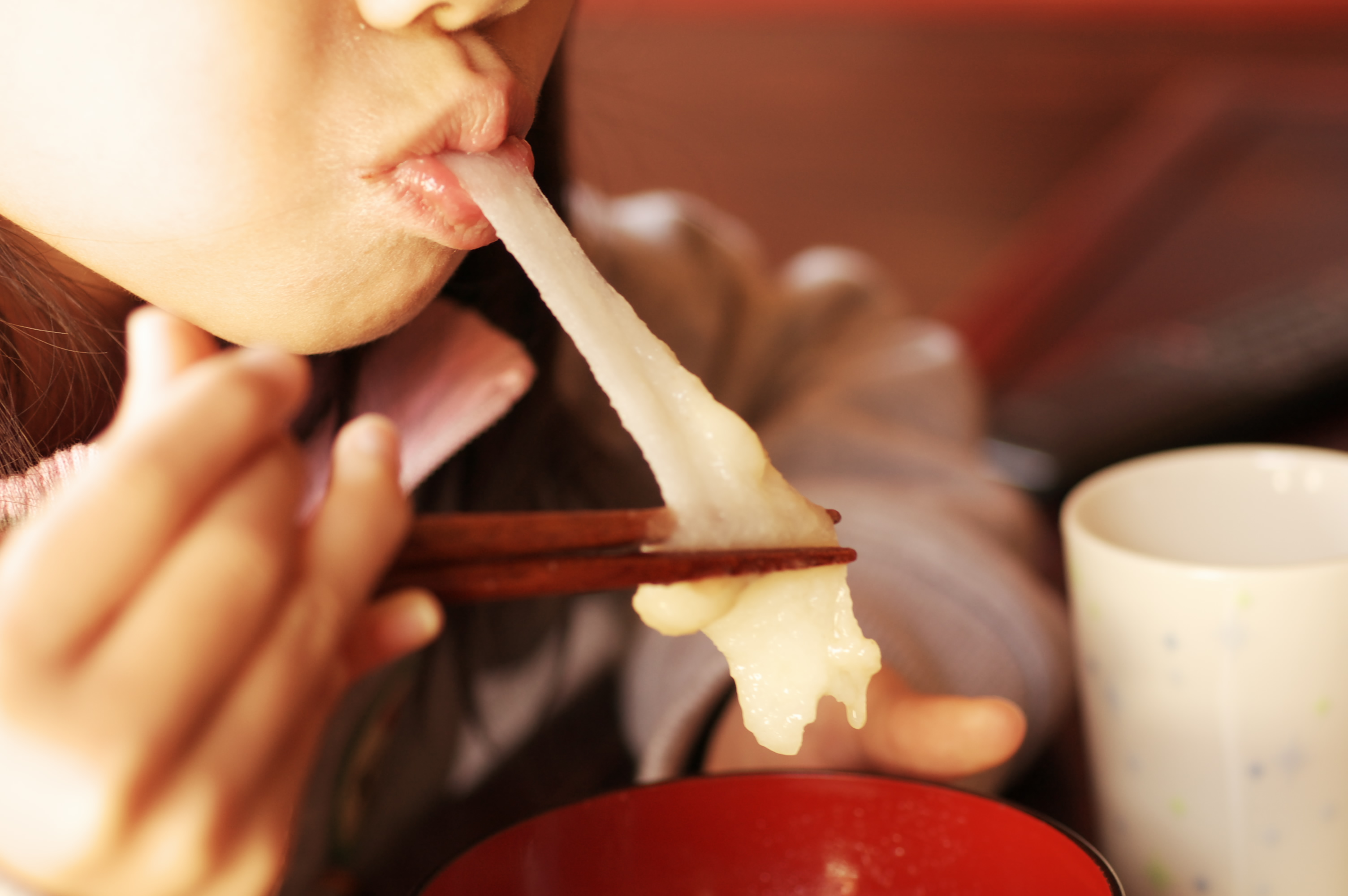
Eating grilled mochi from zōni

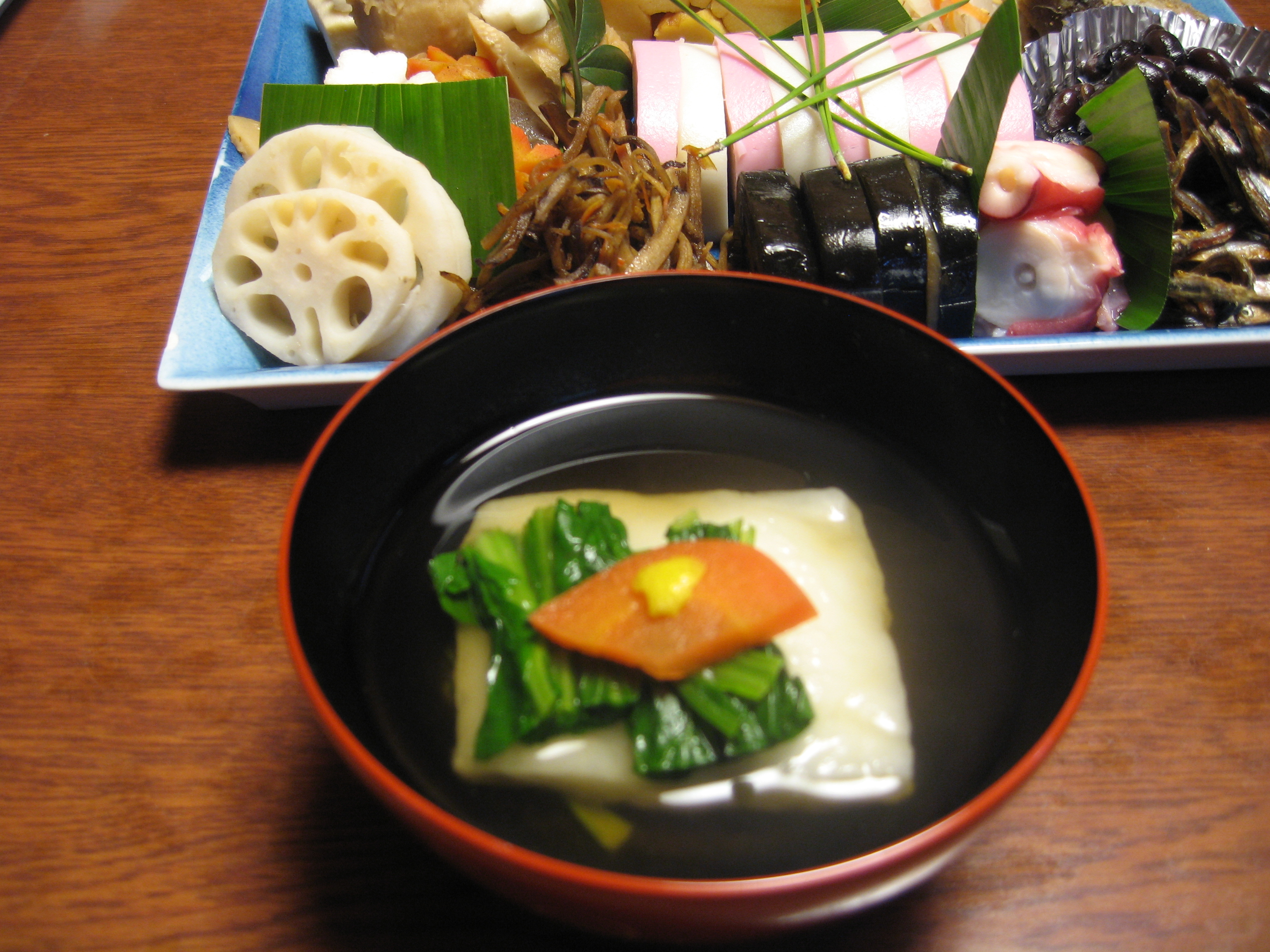
zōni and osechi

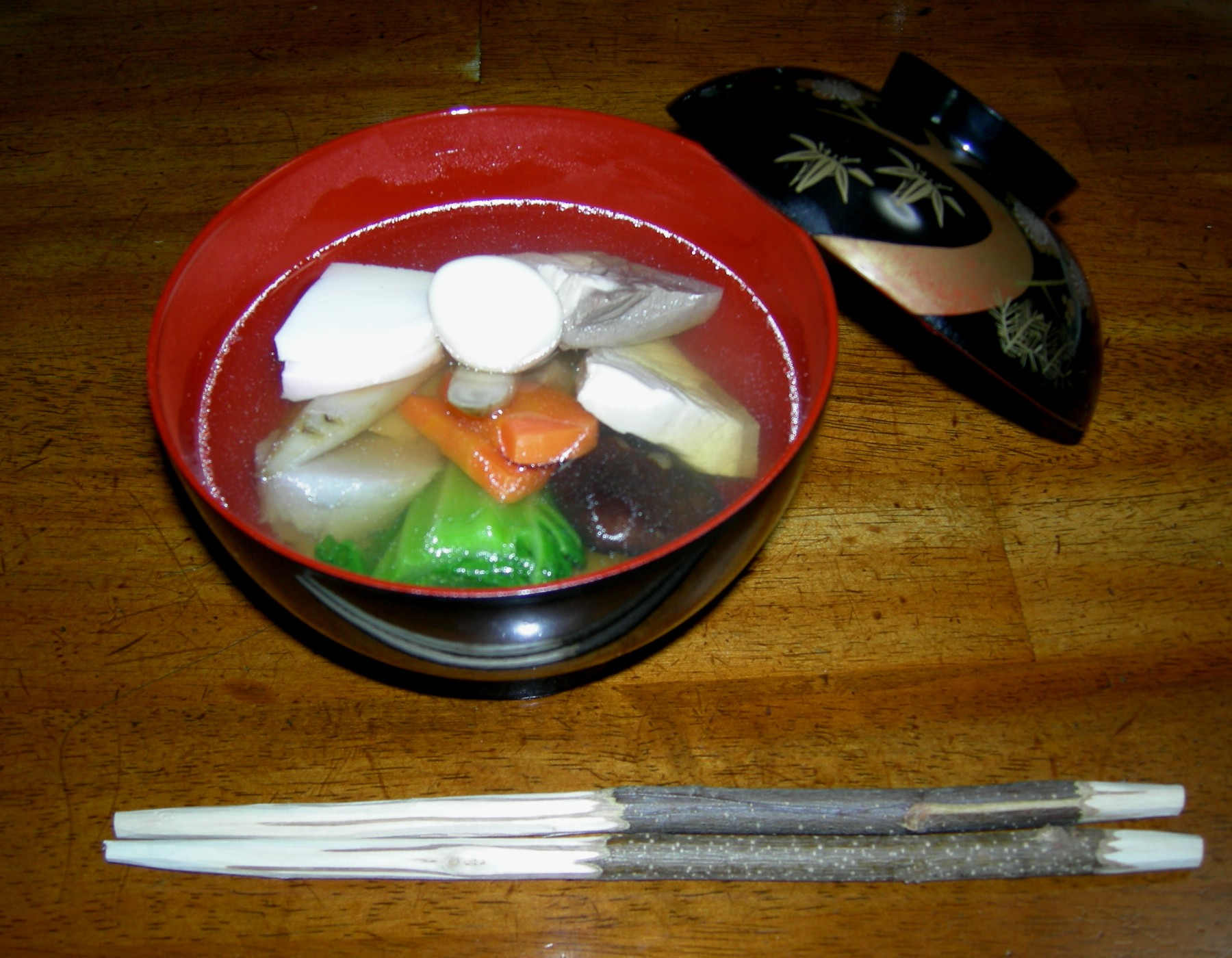
Hakata zōni

Zōni (雑煮 or ぞうに), often with the honorific "o-" as o-zōni, is a Japanese soup containing mochi rice cakes. The dish is strongly associated with the Japanese New Year and its tradition of osechi ceremonial foods. The preparation of zōni varies both by household and region.

== Etymology ==
Zōni is written in the Japanese language using two kanji characters. Since the first, 雑 means "miscellaneous" or "mixed", and the second, 煮, means "simmer" or "boil", it is thought that the word is derived from the fact that zōni consists of many miscellaneous items of food (such as mochi, vegetables and seafood) being boiled together. Formerly, amongst samurai society, the dish was referred to as "烹雑" (hōzō) with 烹 also being an archaic term for "to simmer" or "to boil".

== Origin ==
It is said that zōni finds its roots in samurai society cuisine. It is thought to be a meal that was cooked on field during battles, boiled together with mochi, vegetables and dried foods, among other ingredients. It is also generally believed that this original meal, at first exclusive to samurai, eventually became a staple food of the common people. Zōni was first served as part of a full-course dinner (honzen ryōri), and thus is thought to have been a considerably important meal to samurai.

The tradition of eating zōni on New Year's Day dates to the end of the Muromachi period (1336–1573). The dish was offered to the gods in a ceremony on New Year's Eve.

== Variations ==
=== Stock ===
Zōni has numerous regional variations in Japan. In many regions including the Kantō region, zōni consists of a clear soup called sumashi-jiru which is flavoured with dashi, a stock made from soy sauce, flakes of dried bonito, and/or kombu. In the Kansai region and eastern Shikoku, zōni is made with a stock of white miso, while zōni in the part of Fukui Prefecture is made with a stock of red miso. In the Tottori-Izumo region, a variety of red bean soup is used for zōni.

=== Mochi ===
The preparation of the mochi for the dish also varies by region. In the Kantō region and Tōhoku region, the mochi are cut into squares and grilled before being added to the stock. In the Kansai region and the Chūgoku region, a round, boiled mochi is generally preferred. In most of the Kyushu region, a round mochi is popular, but grill-boil difference changes depending on area. In some areas taro or tofu is used instead of mochi. This type of zōni is found on some islands or mountainous areas where rice is not grown to a large extent.

=== Additions ===
Common additions to the soup include chicken, fish or meatballs; leafy vegetables such as komatsuna or spinach; mitsuba (a Japanese herb similar to parsley); kamaboko such as naruto and carrot flakes for colour; and flakes of yuzu peel for its citrus fragrance. Regional specialties are often added. A sprinkle of seven-spice chili flakes (shichimi) is sometimes added at the table.

== See also ==
- Tteokguk
- Japanese New Year
- List of Japanese soups and stews
- List of rice dishes
