= Toso =

Type of spiced medicinal sake

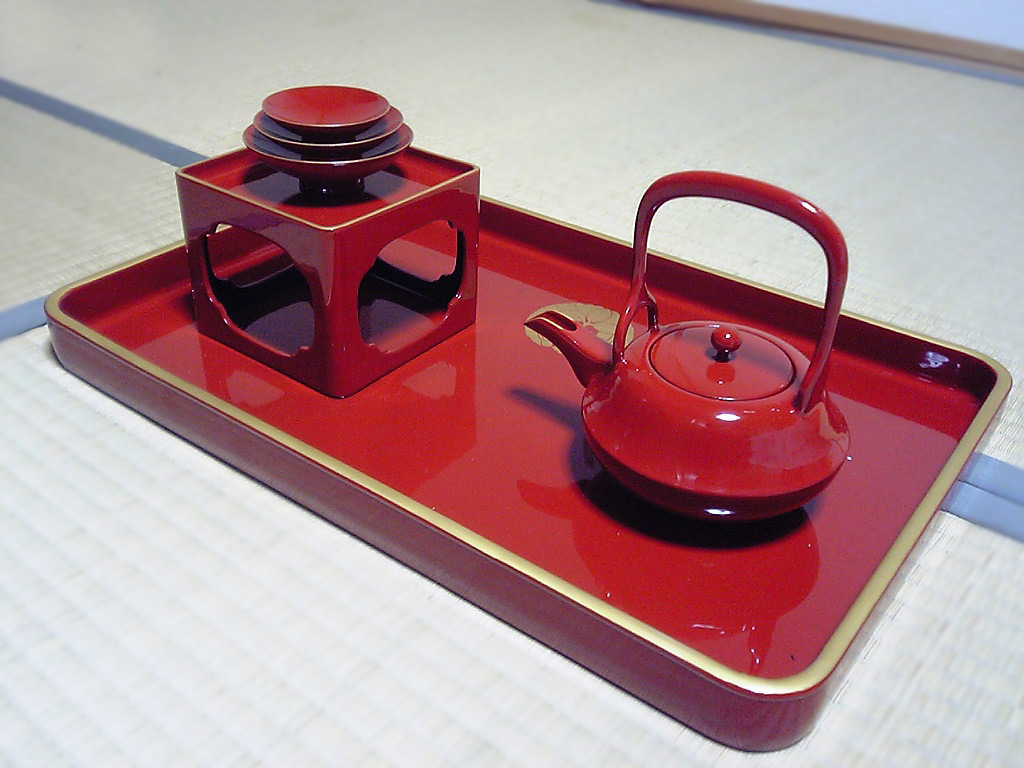
O-toso and three sakazuki lacquered vermillion cups

Toso (屠蘇), or o-toso, is spiced medicinal sake traditionally drunk during Japanese New Year celebrations. Toso is also known historically in China.

== Culture ==
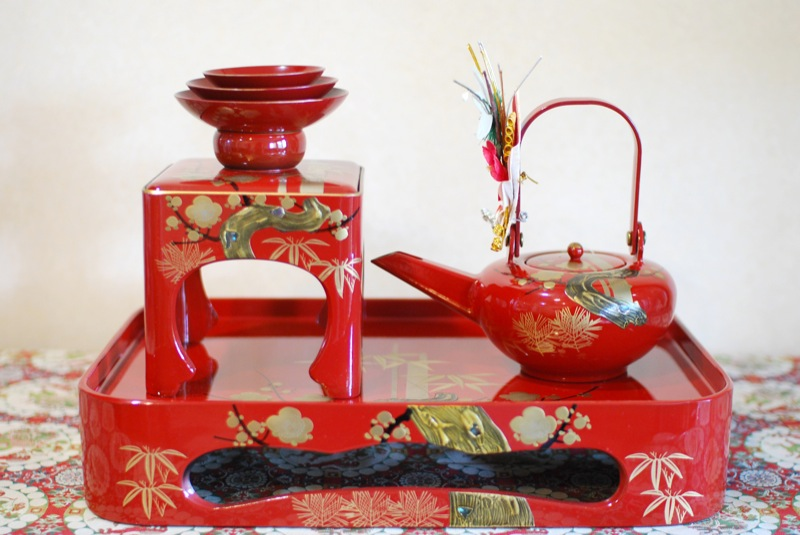
O-toso, also known as spiced sake

Toso is drunk to flush away the previous year's maladies and to aspire to lead a long life. For generations it has been said that "if one person drinks this his family will not fall ill; if the whole family does, no one in the village will fall ill" and has been a staple part of New Year's osechi cuisine in Japan.

A toso set in a museum, 2021

Toso is written using two kanji: 蘇 representing evil spirits and 屠 meaning to slaughter.

Toso is made by combining several medicinal herbs to form tososan (屠蘇散), a spicy mixture, which is then soaked in sake or mirin. If made with mirin, essentially a sweet sake, it is suitable for drinking, but using fermented mirin seasoning would not be appropriate as it is too salty.

Three sizes of cup, called sakazuki (盃) (see picture), are used starting with the smallest and passed round with each family member or guest taking a sip. Drinking rituals differ by region, but in formal situations proceed from youngest to eldest. This tradition originated in China in the hope for children to grow faster and their elders to age slower. However, in Japan, around the beginning of the Meiji or Shōwa periods, custom changed and the head of the household usually takes the first drink.

The tradition of drinking toso at the New Year began in the Tang dynasty in China and was adopted by Japanese aristocrats during the Heian period. The first cup drunk would be made with tososan and the second and third cups with different varieties called byakusan and toshōsan.

The drinking ceremony finally passed to the general public and doctors would give out tososan. Even today some chemists' shops have retained the custom and give tososan away as a free gift at the end of the year.

The custom is now mainly limited to Kansai and west Japan; in other regions celebratory o-toso at New Year is often plain sake without tososan.

== Ingredients ==
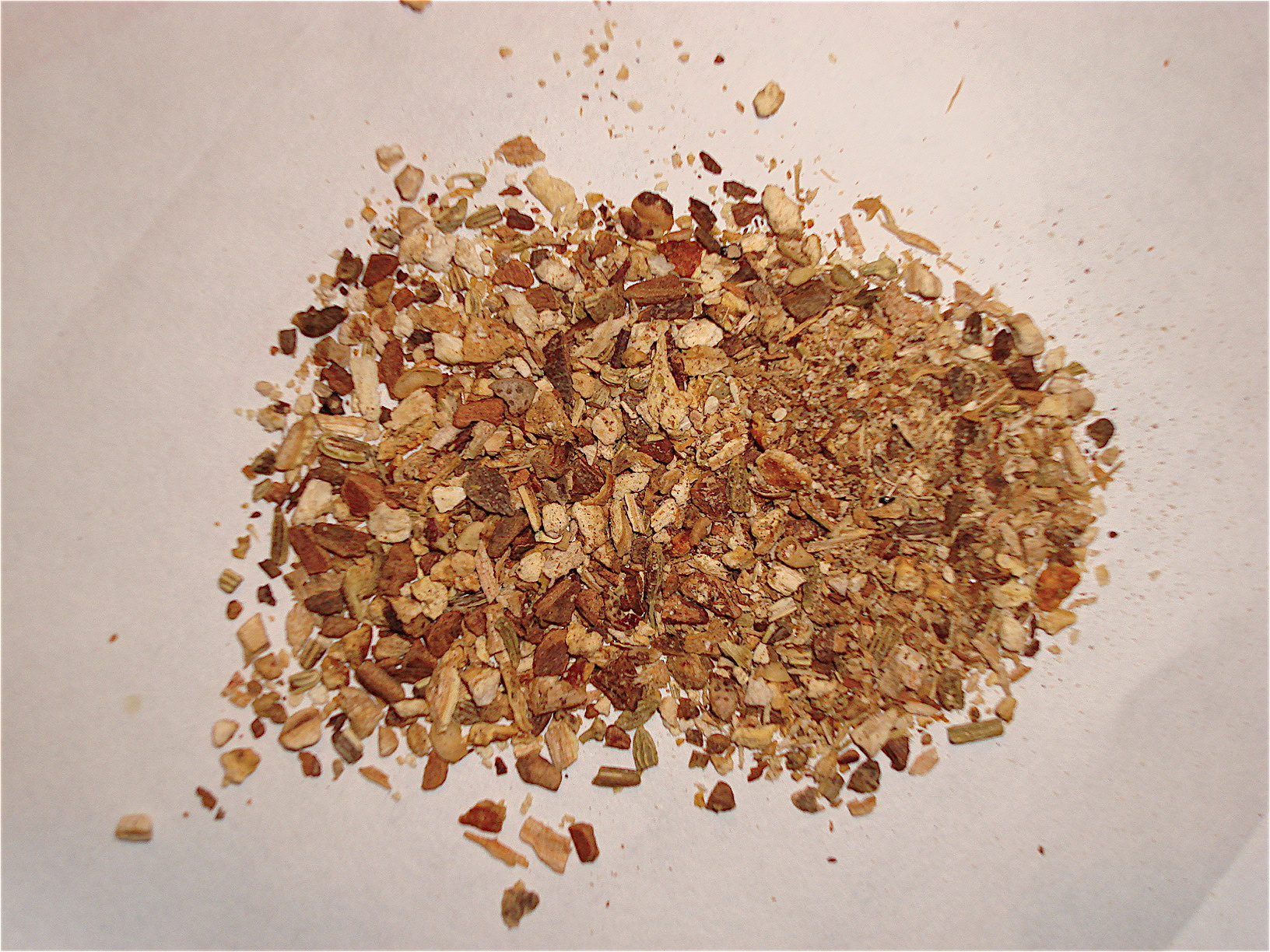
Tososan

The recipe is said to have originated as a prescription of the famous Chinese physician Zhang Zhongjing during the Eastern Han period.

Ingredients have changed somewhat over time; some of the original Chinese ones were deemed at one point or another to be too potent for casual consumption. Nowadays it is typically made from Japanese pepper, asiasari radix, apiaceae, cinnamon, dried ginger, atractylodes Japonica, Chinese bellflower and rhubarb, amongst others.

== See also ==
- Mulled wine
- Tamagozake

== Sources ==
- Primarily translated from the Japanese Wikipedia article as of 6 January 2007.
