= Tataki gobo =

Japanese condiment made with burdock root

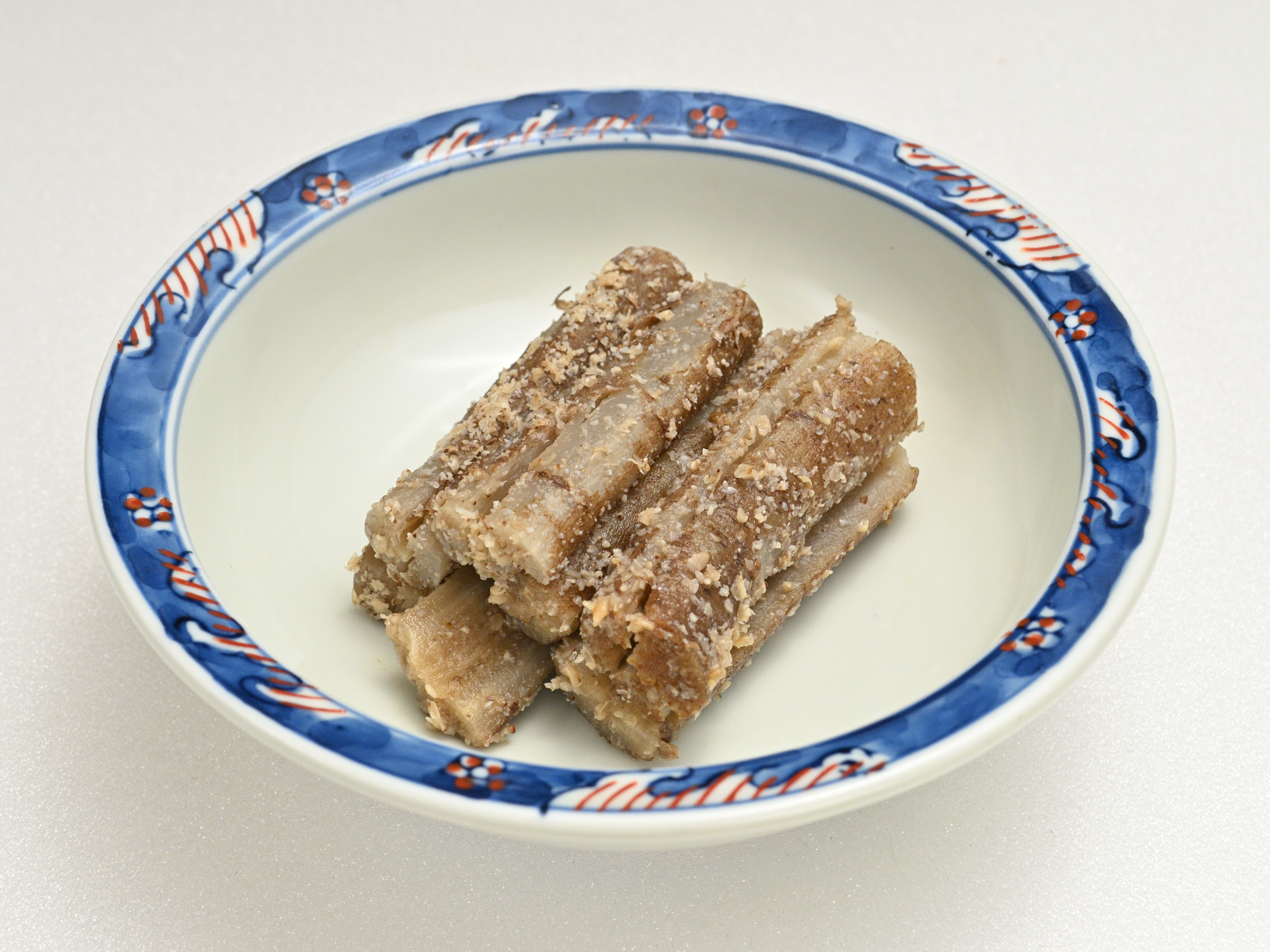

Tataki gobo (たたき牛蒡, means "pounded burdock" in Japanese) is a type of nimono (simmered) dish in Japanese cuisine. It is usually served as a condiment for rice or a side for sake. The burdock is simmered until parboiled, pounded and shredded into smaller pieces. It is seasoned with sesame seed paste, dashi, soy sauce, vinegar, and sugar. It is refrigerated for at least 24 hours in the dressing, similar to a pickle.
