= Zoni, Kozani =

Village in the Greek region of Western Macedonia

Zoni Ζώνη
- Community
- Location within Greece
- Coordinates: 40°18′29″N 21°07′49″E
- Country: Greece
- Administrative region: Western Macedonia
- Regional unit: Kozani
- Municipality: Voio
- Municipal unit: Tsotyli

Population (2021)
  - Community: 58
- Time zone: UTC+2 (EET)
  - Summer (DST): UTC+3 (EEST)
- Postal code: 50002
- Area code: +30 2468

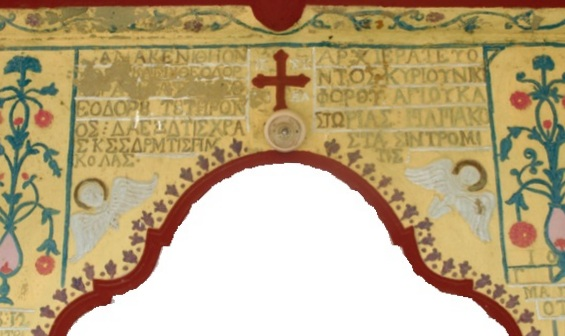
Saints Cosmas and Damian Church in Zoni entrance inscription.

Zoni (Greek: Ζώνη, before 1927: Ζάντσικον – Zantsikon, between 1927 and 1928: Γερακοχώρι – Gerakochori), is a village located in the Tsotyli municipal unit of the municipality if Voio, situated in Kozani regional unit, in the Greek region of Western Macedonia. The town of Kozani is 83 kilometers to the east.

Zoni's elevation is 1,050 meters above sea level. At the 2021 census, the population was 58.
