= Honzen-ryōri =

Style of Japanese cuisine

Honzen-ryōri (本膳料理) is one of three basic styles of Japanese cuisine and a highly ritualized form of serving food, in which prescribed dishes are carefully arranged and served on legged trays; full-course dinner, regular dinner. Honzen has largely disappeared since the mid-20th century, though a few restaurants still serve what they bill as honzen ryōri. It largely survives today as one of the main influences of kaiseki cuisine.

== History ==
Honzen arose among warrior households in the Muromachi period (14th century), in contrast to the earlier yūsoku-ryōri (有職料理) (9th century) of the aristocracy. This corresponded with the rise and subsequent entrenchment of the power of the warrior class vis-a-vis the nobility.

During the Muromachi period after the shōgun Ashikaga Yoshimitsu in the 14th century, developed an elaborate formal system of meal-serving, known as (honzen-ryōri (本膳料理). It would begin with the shiki-sankon (式三献, "triple round of drinks"), the remnant of which is the san san kudo (三三九度) exchanged between the groom and the bride in traditional Japanese weddings. A typical pattern is shichigosan (七五三, "7-5-3"), which may refer to three trays bearing with 7, 5, and 3 dishes, though there seems to be different interpretations, and others have suggested this indicates the triple round of drinks, followed by 5 rounds, then by 7 trays. The meals for guests are served on sanpō (三方), where the tray (technically called oshiki (折敷)) is supported underneath by a boxlike frame with three of the sides hollowed by large holes. A quadruple-holed tray-set would be reserved for the Imperial house.

Honzen has mostly fallen out of practice in the post-World War II period.
