= Japanese New Year =

Traditional holiday

Japanese New Year (Oshōgatsu)
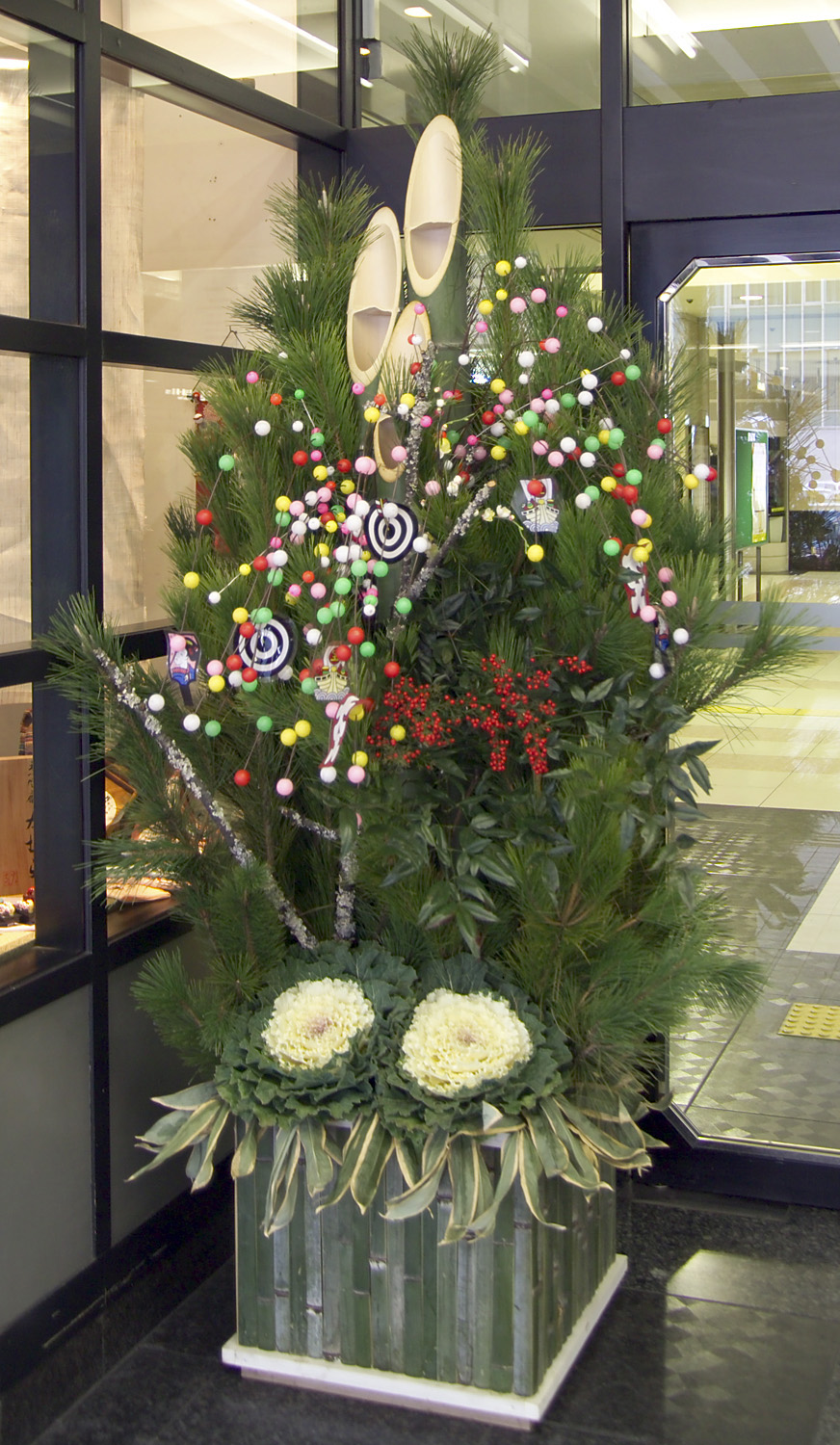
- The kadomatsu is a traditional decoration for the new year holiday.
- Official name: Shōgatsu (正月) or Oshōgatsu
- Also called: New year
- Observed by: Japan
- Type: Cultural
- Significance: Celebrates the new year
- Observances: Holiday
- Begins: December 31/January 1
- Ends: January 4
- Date: January 1
- Next time: 1 January 2027
- Frequency: annual
- Related to: New Year's Day, Chinese New Year, Korean New Year, Vietnamese New Year, Mongolian New Year, Tibetan New Year, Taiwanese New Year

The Japanese New Year (正月, Shōgatsu) is an annual festival that takes place in Japan. Since 1873, the official Japanese New Year has been celebrated according to the Gregorian calendar, on January 1 of each year, New Year's Day (元日, Ganjitsu).

Prior to 1872, traditional events of the Japanese New Year were celebrated on the first day of the year on the modern Tenpō calendar, the last official lunisolar calendar.

== History ==
Prior to the Meiji period, the date of the Japanese New Year had been based on Japanese versions of lunisolar calendar (the last of which was the Tenpō calendar) and, prior to Jōkyō calendar, the Chinese version. However, in 1873, five years after the Meiji Restoration, Japan adopted the Gregorian calendar and the first day of January became the official and cultural New Year's Day in Japan.

== Traditional food ==
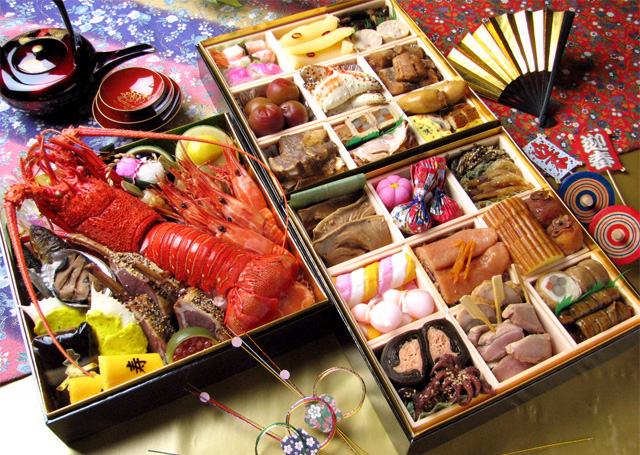
Osechi-ryōri, typical new year's dishes

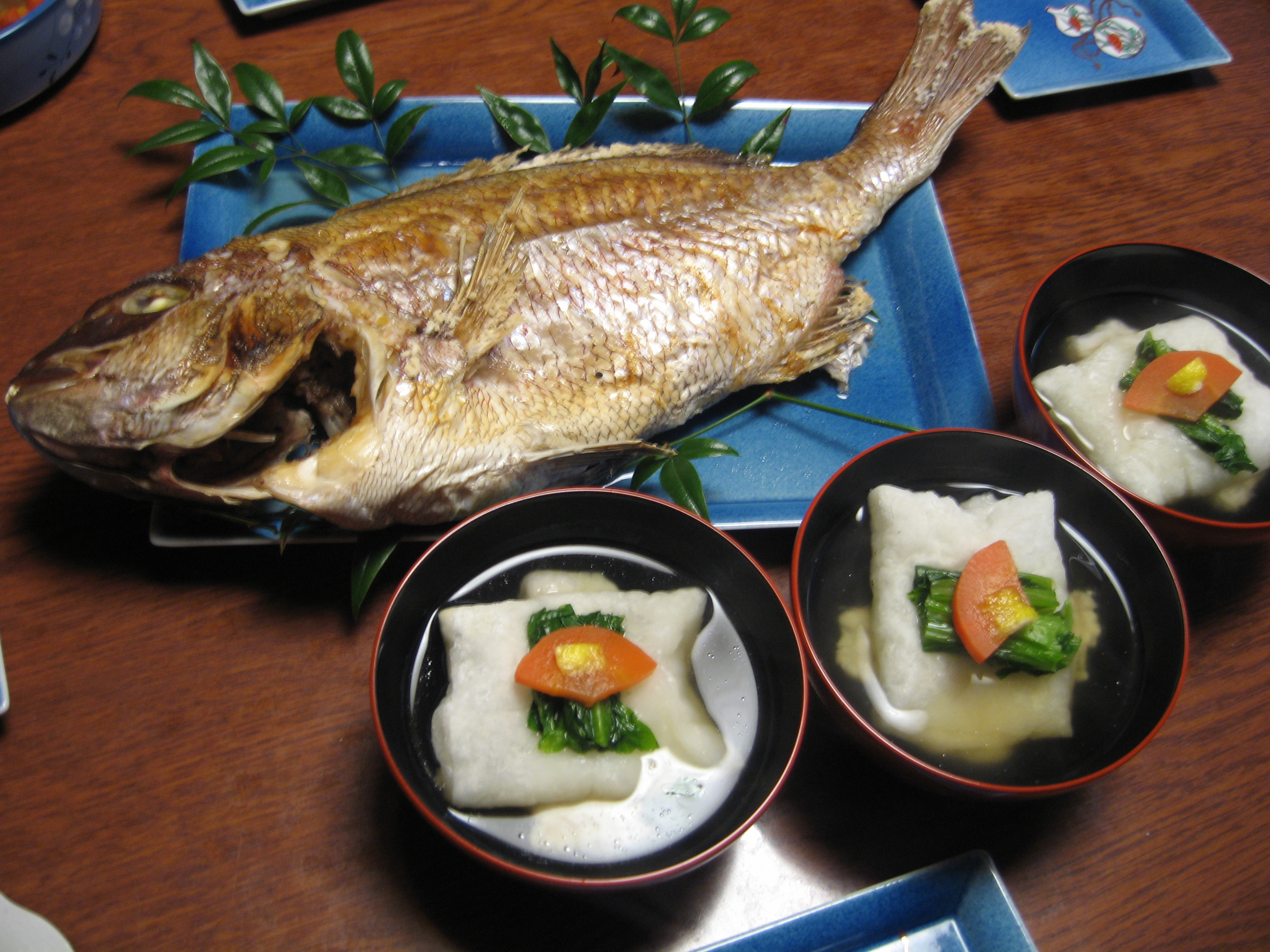
Zōni, a soup with mochi and grilled fish

The Japanese eat a selection of dishes during the New Year celebration called osechi-ryōri, typically shortened to osechi. Many of these dishes are sweet, sour, or dried, so they can be kept without refrigeration: the culinary traditions date to a time before households had refrigerators and when most stores closed for the holidays. There are many variations of osechi, and some foods eaten in one region are not eaten in other places (or are even considered inauspicious or banned) on New Year's Day.

Another popular dish is ozōni, a soup with mochi rice cake and other ingredients, which differ in various regions of Japan. It is also very common to eat buckwheat noodles called toshikoshi soba on ōmisoka (New Year's Eve).

Today, sashimi and sushi are often eaten, as well as non-Japanese foods. To let the overworked stomach rest, seven-herb rice soup (七草粥, nanakusa-gayu) is prepared on the seventh day of January, a day known as jinjitsu.

== Mochi ==
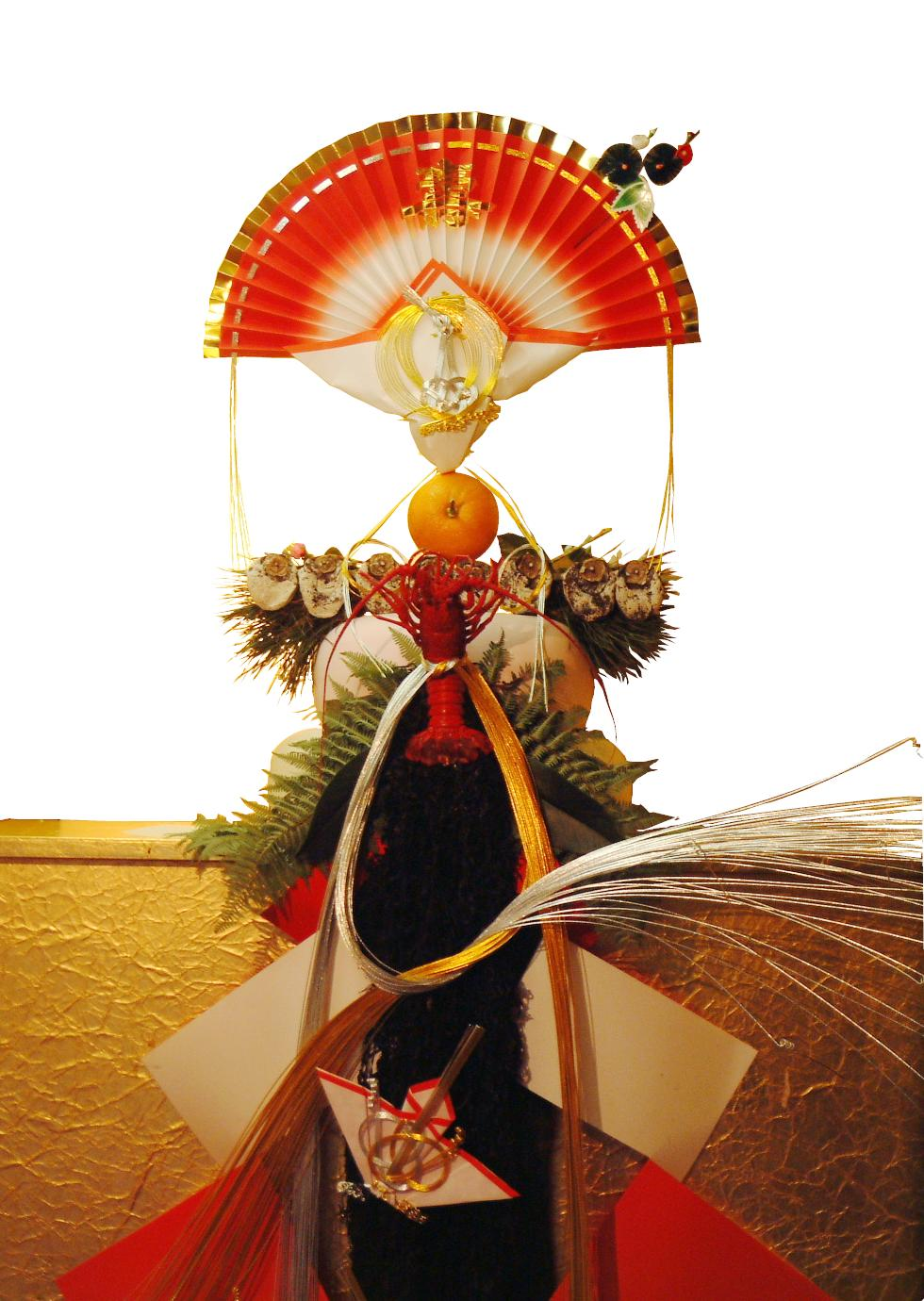
A traditionally ornamented kagami mochi

Another custom is to create and eat rice cakes (mochi). Steamed sticky rice (mochigome) is put into a wooden container usu and patted with water by one person while another person hits it with a large wooden mallet. Mashing the rice, it forms a sticky white dumpling. This is made before New Year's Day and eaten during the beginning of January.

Mochi is made into a New Year's decoration called kagami mochi, formed from two round cakes of mochi with a tangerine (daidai) placed on top. The name daidai is supposed to be auspicious since it means "several generations."

== Bell ringing ==
A group rings a local temple bell shortly after midnight of the New Year (2008)

At midnight on December 31, Buddhist temples all over Japan ring their bells a total of 108 times (Joya no Kane (除夜の鐘)) to symbolize the 108 earthly temptations in Buddhist belief, and to get rid of the 108 worldly desires regarding sense and feeling in every Japanese citizen. A major attraction is The Watched Night bell, in Tokyo. A traditional Japanese belief is that ringing bells can rid the sins of the passing year. The bell is rung 107 times on the 31st and once past midnight.

== Nenga ==
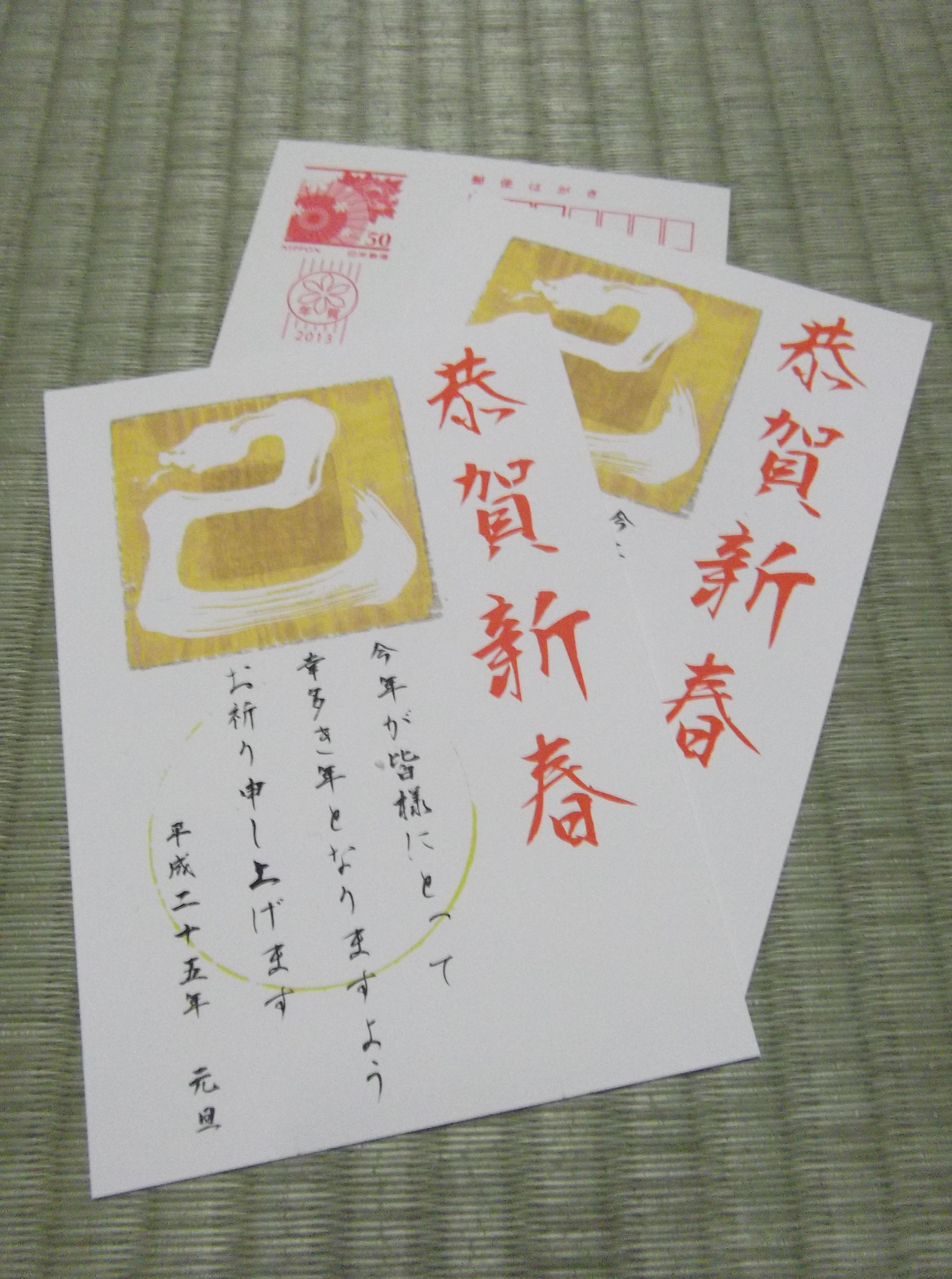
Nengajō, new year cards in Japan

The end of December and the beginning of January are the busiest for Japanese post offices. The Japanese have a custom of sending New Year's Day postcards (年賀状, nengajō) to their friends and relatives, similar to the Western custom of sending Christmas cards. The original purpose was to give faraway friends and relatives tidings of oneself and one's immediate family— to tell those whom one did not often meet that he/she was alive and well.

Sending these greetings is timed so they will arrive on January 1. The post office guarantees delivery on that day if the cards are marked with the word nengajō and mailed between mid-December and a few days before year's end. To deliver them on time, the post office usually hires students part-time.

It is customary to refrain from sending these postcards when there has been a death in the family during the year. In this case, a family member sends a simple mourning postcard (喪中葉書, mochū hagaki) to inform friends and relatives that they should not send New Year's cards, out of respect for the deceased.

People get their nengajō from many sources. Stationers sell preprinted cards. Most of these have the Chinese zodiac sign of the New Year as their design, conventional greetings, or both. The Chinese zodiac has a cycle of 12 years. Each year is represented by an animal.

The animals are, in order: Rat, Ox, Tiger, Rabbit, Dragon, Snake, Horse, Goat, Monkey, Rooster, Dog, and Pig. 2020 was the year of the Rat and the most recent start of the cycle. Famous characters like Snoopy, (2006) and other cartoon characters like Mickey and Minnie Mouse, (2008) have been especially popular in their celebrated years.

Addressing is generally done by hand, and is an opportunity to demonstrate one's handwriting (see shodō). The postcards may have spaces for the sender to write a personal message. Blank cards are available, so people can hand-write or draw their own. Rubber stamps with conventional messages and with the annual animal are for sale at department stores and other outlets, and many people buy ink brushes for personal greetings.

Special printing devices are popular, especially among people who practice crafts. Computer software also lets artists create and print their own designs. Very social individuals, who have hundreds of cards to write, may go to print shops and choose from a wide variety of cards prepared with short messages, so the sender only has to address them. Despite the omnipresence of email, the nengajō remains very popular, although the younger generation sends hardly any cards. They prefer to exchange digital greetings via mobile phones, and in recent years the wider society gradually has come to accept digital greetings.

Conventional greetings include:

- kotoshi mo yoroshiku o-negai-shimasu (今年もよろしくお願いします, ' I hope for your favor again in the coming year')
- (shinnen) akemashite o-medetō-gozaimasu ((新年)あけましておめでとうございます, 'Happiness to you on the dawn [of a New Year]')
- kinga shinnen (謹賀新年, ' Happy New Year')
- gashō (賀正, to celebrate January)
- shoshun/hatsuharu (初春, ' early spring'; in the traditional lunar calendar a year begins in early spring)
- geishun (迎春, to welcome spring)

== Otoshidama ==
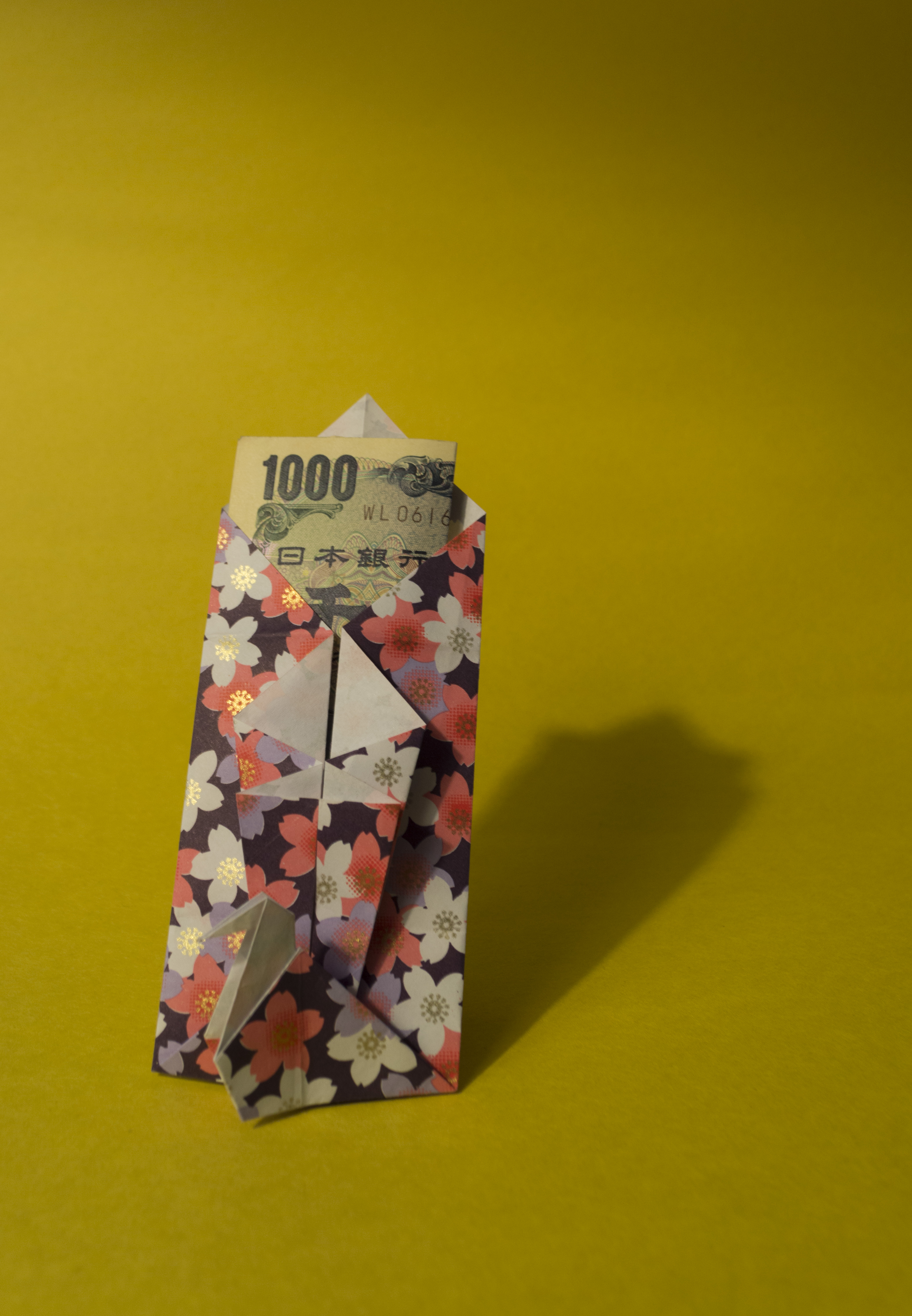
Pouch (ポチ袋) made of origami (折り紙).

On New Year's Day, Japanese people have a custom known as otoshidama where adult relatives give money to children. It is handed out in small decorated envelopes called pochibukuro, similar to Shūgi-bukuro or Chinese hóngbāo and to the Scottish handsel. In the Edo period, large stores and wealthy families would give out a small bag of mochi and a Mandarin orange to spread happiness all around.

The amount of money given depends on the age of the child but is usually the same if there is more than one child so that no one feels slighted. It is not uncommon for amounts greater than ¥5,000 (approximately US$30) to be given.

== Poetry ==
The New Year traditions are also a part of Japanese poetry, including haiku (poems with 17 syllables, in three lines of five, seven and five) and renga (linked poetry). All of the traditions above would be appropriate to include in haiku as kigo (season words).

There are also haiku that celebrate many of the "first" of the New Year, such as the "first sun" (hatsuhi) or "first sunrise", "first laughter" (waraizome—starting the New Year with a smile is considered a good sign), and first dream (hatsuyume). Since the traditional New Year was later in the year than the current date, many of these mention the beginning of spring.

Along with the New Year's Day postcard, haiku might mention "first letter" (hatsudayori—meaning the first exchange of letters), "first calligraphy" (kakizome), and "first brush" (fude hajime).

== Takarabune ==
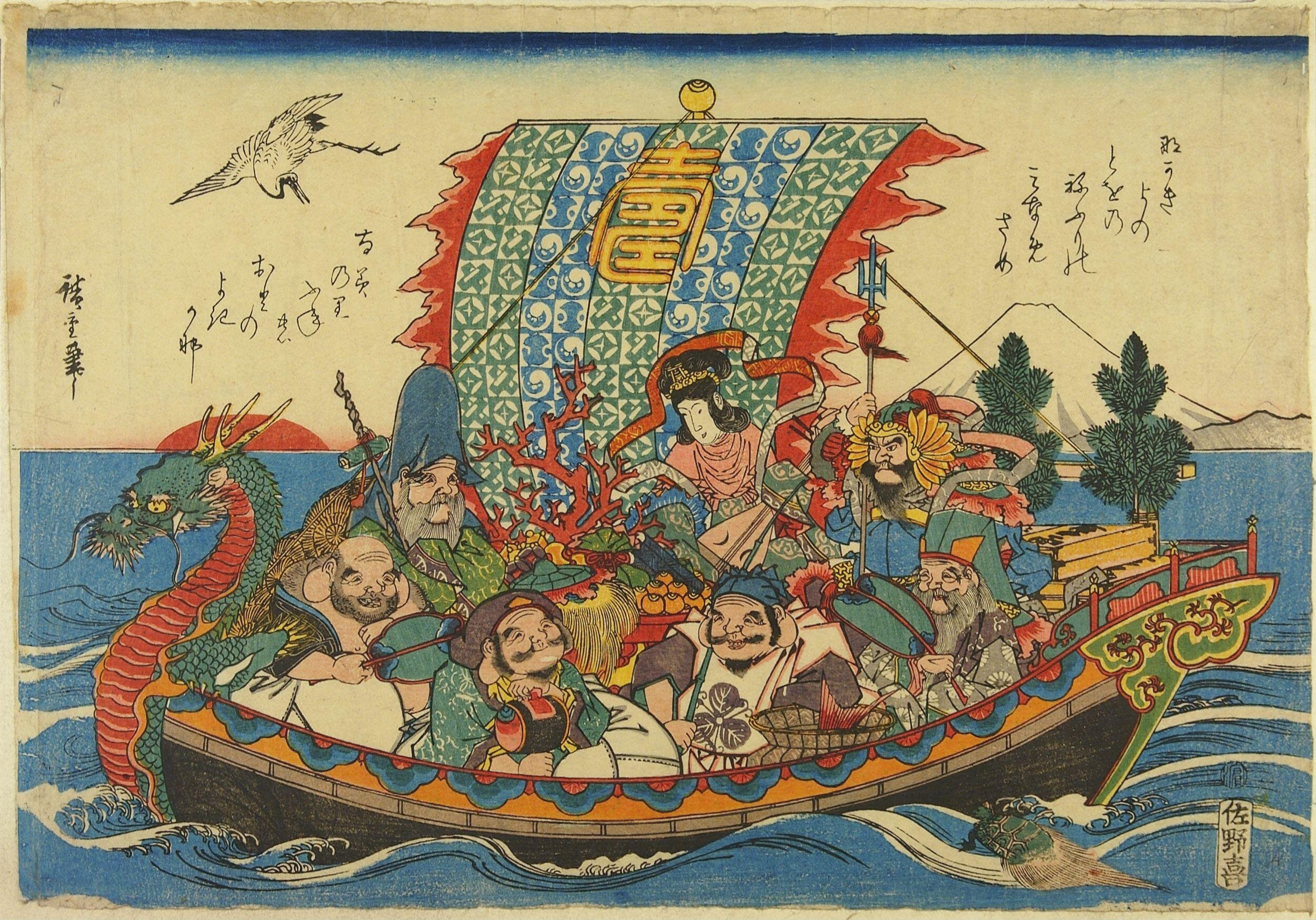
Coloured woodblock print of the Takarabune by Utagawa Hiroshige

During the first three days of the New Year the Seven Lucky Gods are said to pilot through the heavens to human ports on the Takarabune or Treasure Ship. A picture of the ship forms an essential part of traditional Japanese New Year celebrations.

== Games ==
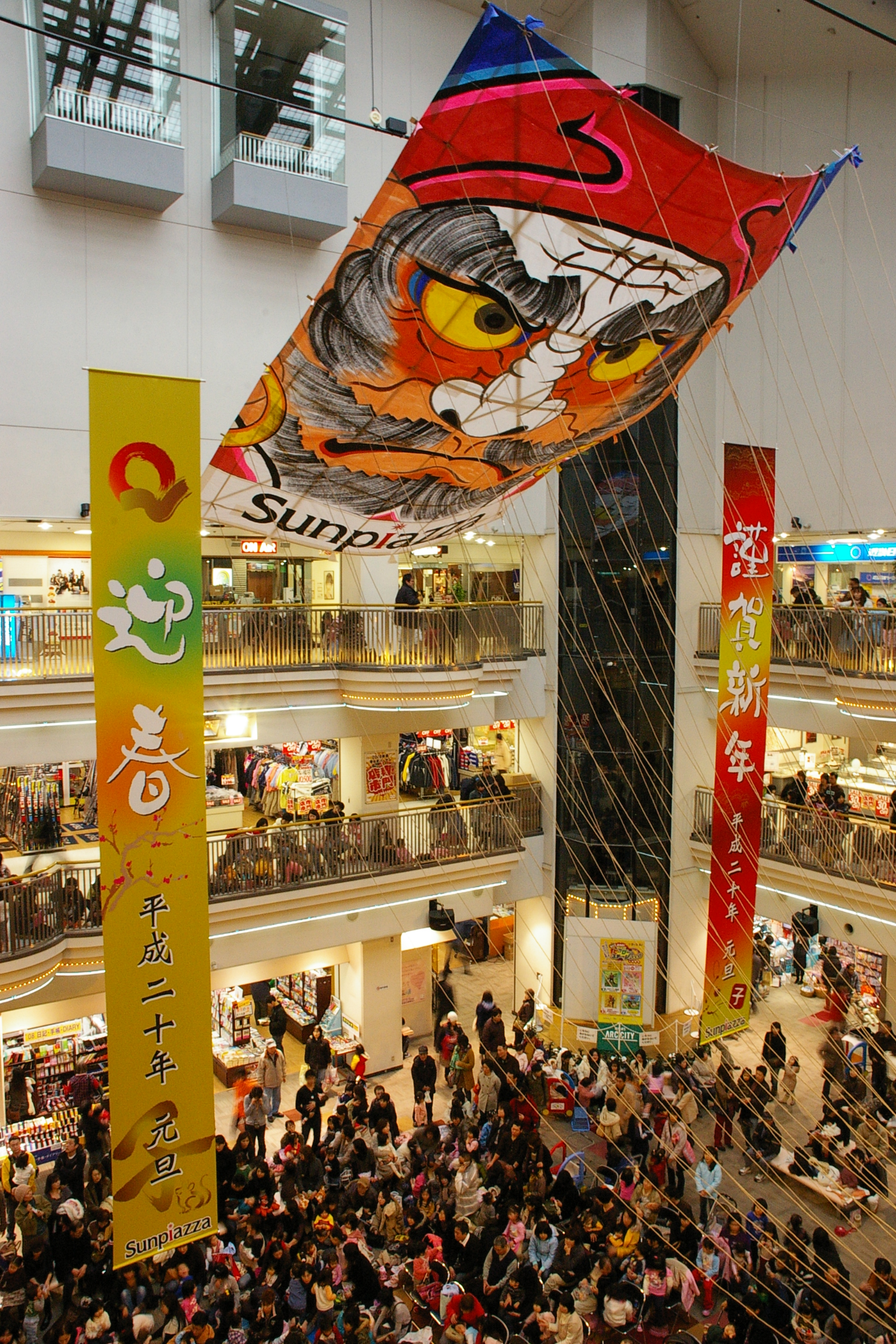
Displayed large kite in new year Japan

It was also customary to play many New Year's games. These include hanetsuki, takoage (kite flying), koma (spinning top), sugoroku, fukuwarai (whereby a blindfolded person places paper parts of a face, such as eyes, eyebrows, a nose and a mouth, on a paper face), and karuta (Japanese playing cards).

== Entertainment ==
There are many shows created as the end-of-year, and beginning-of-year entertainment, and some being a special edition of the regular shows. For many decades, it has been customary to watch the TV show Kōhaku Uta Gassen aired on NHK on New Year's Eve. The show features two teams, red and white, of popular music artists competing against each other.

== Sport ==
The final of the Emperor's Cup, the national association football elimination tournament in New Year's Day. The final has taken place on New Year's Day since 1969 and is usually aired on NHK.

Mixed martial arts in Japan organizations such as Pride FC and Dream have held events on New Year's Eve and Rizin Fighting Federation has held New Year's Eve events since its founding in 2015.

== Beethoven's Ninth ==
Beethoven's Ninth Symphony, with accompanying chorus, is traditionally performed throughout Japan during the New Year's season. In December 2009, for example, there were 55 performances of the symphony by various major orchestras and choirs in Japan.

The Ninth was introduced to Japan during World War I by German prisoners held at the Bandō prisoner-of-war camp. Japanese orchestras, notably the NHK Symphony Orchestra, began performing the symphony in 1925. During World War II, the Imperial government promoted performances of the symphony, including on New Year's Eve, to encourage allegiance to Japanese nationalism.

After the war, orchestras and choruses, undergoing economic hard times during the reconstruction of Japan, promoted performances of the piece around New Years because of the popularity of the music with the public. In the 1960s, performances of the symphony at New Years became more widespread, including participation by local choirs and orchestras, and established the tradition which continues to this day.

== Little New Year ==
There also used to be an associated festival of Little New Year (小正月, koshōgatsu), traditionally celebrating the first full moon of the new year, on the 15th day of the first lunar month (approximately mid-February). This was celebrated around January 15, in various respects.

The main events of koshōgatsu are rites and practices praying for a bountiful harvest; rice gruel with adzuki beans (小豆粥, azukigayu) is traditionally eaten in the morning and is involved in the rice gruel divination ceremony. New Year decorations are taken down around this date and burnt in the Sagichō or Dondoyaki fire, and some temples hold events, such as Tōrin-in.

== Japanese Lunar New Year ==
Some regions of Japan, including Okinawa Prefecture and the Amami Islands in Kagoshima Prefecture, used to celebrate Lunar New Year on the first day of the lunar calendar (around the first day of spring, in February of the Gregorian calendar). Nowadays, it is very rare to celebrate lunar new year as the new year is considered January 1.

== See also ==
- First sunrise
- Hatsumōde, the first Shinto shrine visit of the Japanese New Year
- List of Important Intangible Folk Cultural Properties
- Customs and etiquette of Japan
- Japanese festivals
- Japanese calendar
- Japanese cuisine
- Toso, spiced medicinal sake
- Namahage
- Celebrations of Lunar New Year in other parts of Asia:
  - Chinese New Year (Spring Festival)
  - Korean New Year (Seollal)
  - Mongolian New Year (Tsagaan Sar)
  - Taiwanese New Year (Kuè-nî)
  - Tibetan New Year (Losar)
  - Vietnamese New Year (Tết Nguyên Đán)
- Similar Asian Lunisolar New Year celebrations that occur in April:
  - Burmese New Year (Thingyan)
  - Cambodian New Year (Chaul Chnam Thmey)
  - Lao New Year (Pii Mai)
  - Sri Lankan New Year (Aluth Avuruddu)
  - Thai New Year (Songkran)
