= Shisen =

Shisen may refer to:

- the Chinese Sichuan Province (Japanese: 四川, romanized: Shisen) in Japanese
- Shisen-dō (Japanese: 詩仙堂, lit. 'Shisen Temple'), a Buddhist temple of the Sōtō Zen sect in Sakyō-ku, Kyoto, Japan
- Shisen-Sho (Japanese: 四川省, lit. 'Shisen Province'), a Japanese tile-based game similar to Mahjong solitaire
- Heart Aid Shisen (Japanese: ハートエイド・四川, Chinese: 心系四川), a major fund raising concert held on July 14, 2008, in Tokyo, Japan for the victims of the 2008 Sichuan earthquake
- Wang Shishen (1686–1759; Chinese: 汪士慎), Chinese painter and calligrapher

== See also ==
- Four rivers (disambiguation) (Japanese: 四川, romanized: Shi Sen, lit. '4 Rivers')
- Sichuan (disambiguation) (Mandarin Chinese: 四川, lit. '4 Rivers')
- Shi (disambiguation)
- Sen (disambiguation)
