= Sacheon (disambiguation) =

Sacheon (Korean: 사천; Hanja: 泗川) is a city in South Korea.

Sa-cheon, Sa Cheon, Sacheon, Sa Chon, Sa-chon, Sachon, may also refer to:

- Sacheon Airport, Sacheon, South Korea
- Sacheon County (Korean: 사천군; Hanja: 泗川郡), South Gyeongsang, South Korea; see List of counties of South Korea
- Battle of Sacheon (disambiguation), several battles
- ROKS Sacheon (pennant: 59; 사천; 泗川), a PCE-842 class patrolship of the South Korean navy; see List of ships of the Republic of Korea Navy

== See also ==
- Sichuan (disambiguation) (사천; 四川; lit. '4 Rivers')
- Four rivers (disambiguation) (사천; 四川)
- Chon (disambiguation)
- Sa (disambiguation)
