= List of festivals in Japan =

This is an incomplete list of festivals in Japan.

== Film festivals ==
Festival name	Type	City/venue	Years	Notes
Asian Queer Film Festival	Film festival	Tokyo		
CON-CAN Movie Festival	Film festival	Tokyo		
Hiroshima International Animation Festival	Film festival	Hiroshima		
Image Forum Festival	Film festival	Tokyo		
Mainichi Film Awards	Film festival	Tokyo		
Okinawa International Movie Festival	Film festival	Ginowan & Naha, Okinawa Island		
Tokyo Filmex	Film festival	Tokyo		
Tokyo International Film Festival	Film festival	Tokyo		
Tokyo International Lesbian & Gay Film Festival	Film festival	Tokyo		
Yamagata International Documentary Film Festival	Film festival	Yamagata		
Yokohama Film Festival	Film festival	Yokohama		
Yubari International Fantastic Film Festival	Film festival	Yūbari, Hokkaido		

== Music festivals ==
Festival name	Type	City/venue	Years	Notes
B-Boy Park	Hip hop festival			
Central Music & Entertainment Festival	Pop festival	Yokohama		
Concert on the Rock	Rock festival			
Cosquín en Japón	Folk festival			
Fuji Rock Festival	Rock festival			
Heart-Aid Shisen	Rock festival		2008	
Live under the sky	Rock festival			
Loud Park Festival	Heavy metal festival			
Mount Fuji Jazz Festival	Jazz festival			
Naon no Yaon	Rock festival	Hibiya Open-Air Concert Hall	1987–1991, 2008, 2013–present	Exclusively female performers
Newport Jazz Festival in Madarao	Jazz festival			
Rising Sun Rock Festival	Rock festival			
Rock in Japan Festival	Rock festival			
Saito Kinen Festival Matsumoto	Classical music festival			
Songs Day	Pop festival			
Summer Sonic Festival	Rock festival			
Tokyo Music Festival	Pop festival			
Yamaha Popular Song Contest	Pop festival	Kakegawa	1969-1986	Music contest and festival
Yamaha Music Festival	Classical music festival			

== See also ==
- Japanese festivals
- Abare Festival
- Matsuri float
