= Japanese festivals =

Traditional festive occasions

Japanese festivals, or matsuri (Japanese: 祭り), are traditional festive occasions often celebrated with dance and music in Japan. The origin of the word matsuri is related to the kami (神, Shinto deities); there are theories that the word matsuri is derived from matsu (待つ) meaning "to wait (for the kami to descend)", tatematsuru (献る) meaning "to make offerings to the kami", and matsurau (奉う) meaning "to obey the kami". The theory that it is derived from matsurau is the most popular.

It is estimated that there are between 100,000 and 300,000 festivals across Japan, generating an annual economic impact of 530 billion yen as of 2019. As of 2024, 33 of these festivals have been registered as UNESCO Intangible Cultural Heritage Lists as "Yama, Hoko, Yatai, float festivals in Japan". Various folk dances, costume processions, kagura, dengaku, bugaku, and noh performed at festivals are also registered as UNESCO Intangible Cultural Heritage Lists. For example, 41 folk dances including bon odori from various regions of Japan are registered as "Furyu-odori" and 10 costume processions including namahage are registered as "Raihō-shin".

Japanese festivals reflect the unique religious beliefs of the Japanese people, who worship onryō (怨霊, vengeful spirits) and violent kami, based on the background of Japan's frequent natural disasters. Based on the syncretism of Shinto and Buddhism, Japanese people worship not only the spirits that inhabit all things and the souls of their ancestors, but also terrifying onryō and violent kami that protect people from epidemics and natural disasters. For example, Gion Matsuri, Tenjin Matsuri, and Kanda Matsuri, which are considered the three major festivals in Japan, worship the onryō of Gozu Tennō, Sugawara no Michizane, and Taira no Masakado, respectively, and pray for good health and protection from natural disasters. Since these festivals are held in urban areas, each attracts hundreds of thousands to over a million spectators each year. On the other hand, Gion Matsuri, Aoi Matsuri, and Jidai Matsuri are considered the three major festivals in Kyoto. Gion Matsuri attracts huge crowds to see the procession of huge dashi (山車, matsuri floats) and mikoshi (神輿, portable shrines), while Aoi Matsuri and Jidai Matsuri attract crowds to see the procession of people dressed in period costumes.

The Aomori Nebuta Matsuri and the Tokushima Awa Odori are large, historic festivals in local cities that attract more than 2 million visitors each year, and more than 1 million visitors each year, respectively. According to a 2022 survey, they ranked first and second, respectively, in recognition in Japan, with the Gion Matsuri in third place.

There are also many Japanese festivals in which the kami are prayed to for a good harvest of rice and other crops. In agricultural festivals, different ceremonies are held in each of the four seasons, and festivals are classified into different types, such as otaue-matsuri (御田植祭) and aki-matsuri (秋祭り), according to their significance. In general, festivals held in the spring pray for a good harvest for the year, festivals held in the summer pray for rice and crops to be free from pests and storm damage, festivals held in the fall offer gratitude for the harvest, and festivals held in the winter pray for a good harvest in the new year.

Many secular and modern festivals are also held, with the Sapporo Snow Festival attracting 2.73 million visitors in 2019.

== Festivals (matsuri) related to agriculture ==
There are many Japanese festivals in which the kami are prayed to for a good harvest of rice and other crops. These festivals are divided into various types according to their significance and ritual practices, the most representative of which are as follows. Typical spring festival practices are minakuchi-sai (水口祭) and otaue-matsuri (御田植祭). In minakuchi-sai, on the day of planting, soil is piled at the water intake of the rice field, seasonal flowers and twigs are placed, and sake and baked rice are offered to the mountain kami. During otaue-matsuri, young women called saotome (早乙女) enter the rice field to plant rice seedlings and pray for a good harvest. Typical summer festival practices are mushi okuri (虫送り) and amagoi (雨乞い). In mushi okuri, torches are lit at night and straw dolls with pests tied to them are floated or thrown into the river to pray for the repulsion of pests, while in amagoi, dances are dedicated to kami and fires are lit to pray for rain. The typical fall festival practices are niiname-sai (新嘗祭) and aki-matsuri (秋祭り). In niiname-sai, new grains are offered to the kami at the imperial court and at Shinto shrines throughout Japan to thank them for the harvest, and in aki-matsuri, farmers in rural villages thank the kami of the rice fields and send the kami back to the mountains. The typical winter festival practices are sagichō or dondoyaki (左義長 or どんど焼き) and taasobi (田遊び). In sagicho or dondoyaki, kadomatsu (門松) and other New Year's decorations are burned and mochi are roasted and eaten over the flames, and in tasaburi, farm work is simulated in the Shinto shrine hall (拝殿, haiden) to pray for the next year's kami harvest.

== Local festivals (matsuri) ==
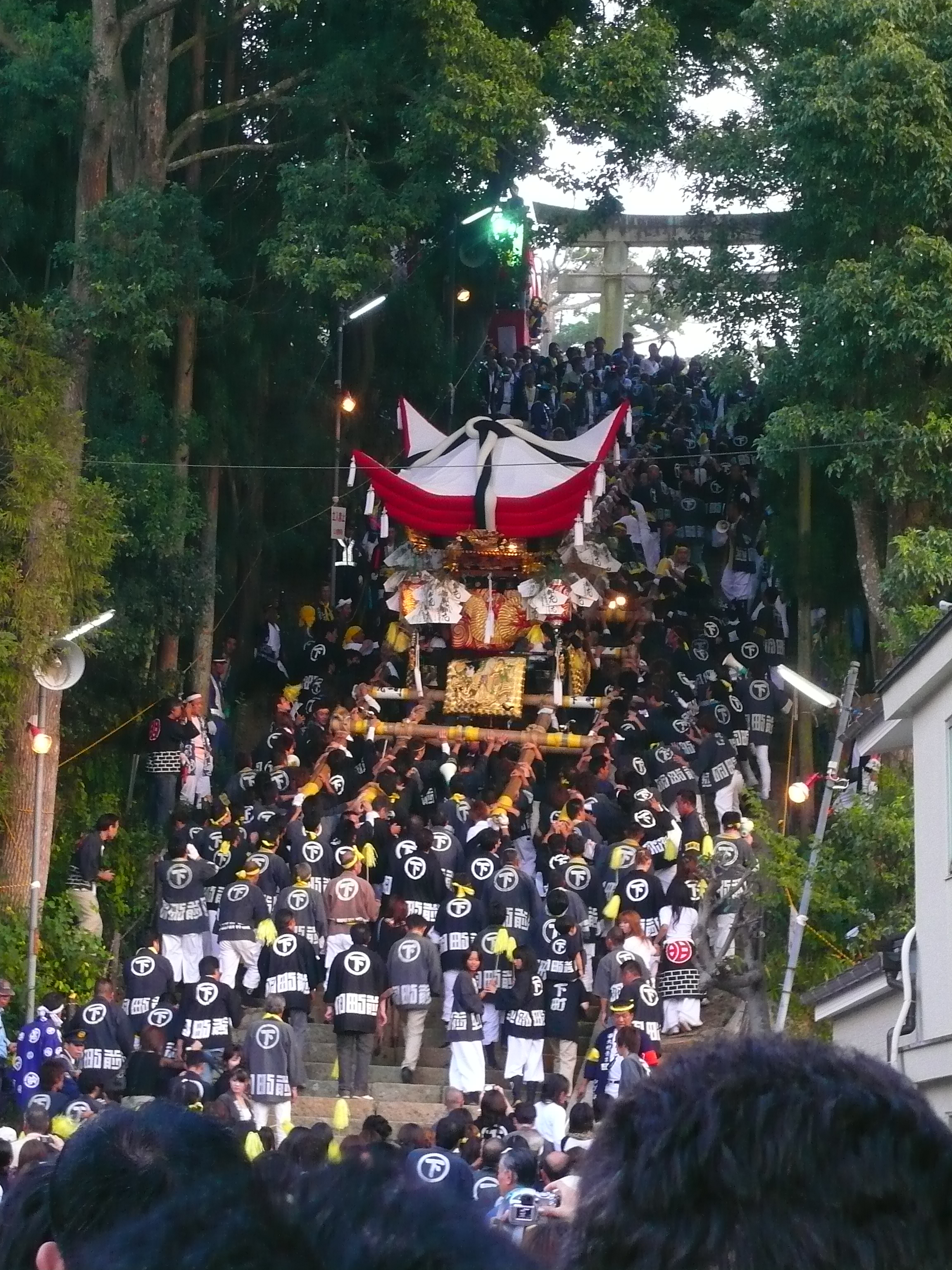
Big Mikoshi "Yatai" Parade on Miki Autumn Harvest Festival in Miki, Hyōgo

Matsuri (祭) is the Japanese word for a festival or holiday. In Japan, festivals are usually sponsored by a local shrine or temple, though they can be secular.

Festivals are often based around one event, with food stalls, entertainment, and carnival games to keep people entertained. Some are based around temples or shrines, others hanabi (fireworks), and still others around contests where the participants sport loin cloths (see: Hadaka Matsuri).

There are no specific matsuri days for all of Japan; dates vary from area to area, and even within a specific area, but festival days do tend to cluster around traditional holidays such as Setsubun or Obon. Almost every locale has at least one matsuri in late summer/early autumn, usually related to the paddy harvest. Umadashi Matsuri is an event typically held during fall festivals.

Notable matsuri often feature processions which may include elaborate floats. Preparation for these processions is usually organized at the level of neighborhoods, or machi. Prior to these, the local kami may be ritually installed in mikoshi and paraded through the streets.

One can always find in the vicinity of a matsuri booths selling souvenirs and food such as takoyaki, and games, such as Goldfish scooping. Karaoke contests, sumo matches, and other forms of entertainment are often organized in conjunction with matsuri. If the festival is next to a lake, renting a boat is also an attraction.

Favorite elements of the most popular matsuri, such as the Nada no Kenka Matsuri of Himeji or the Neputa Matsuri of Hirosaki, are often broadcast on television for the entire nation to enjoy.

=== List of famous matsuri ===
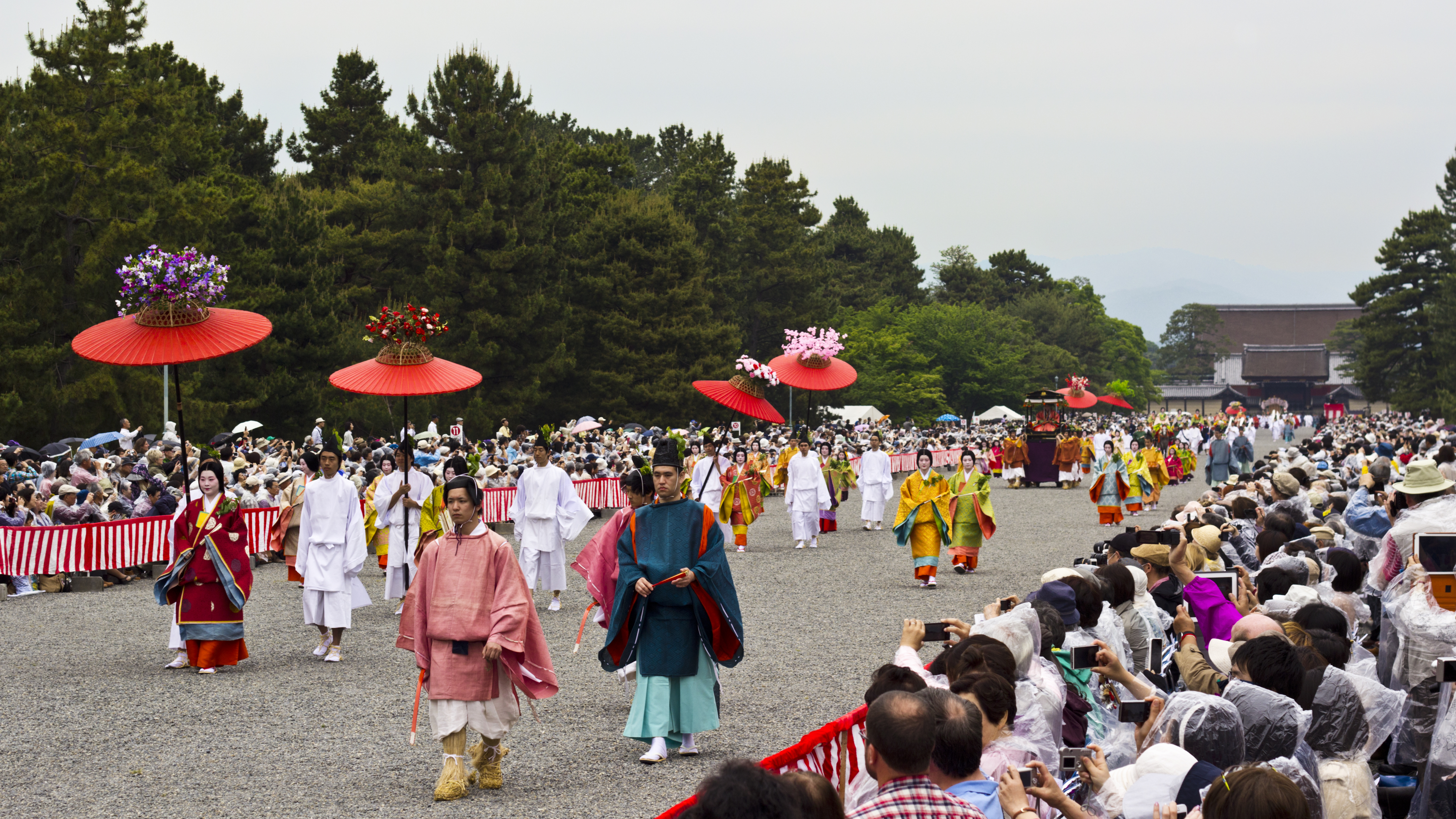
Aoi Matsuri in Kyoto

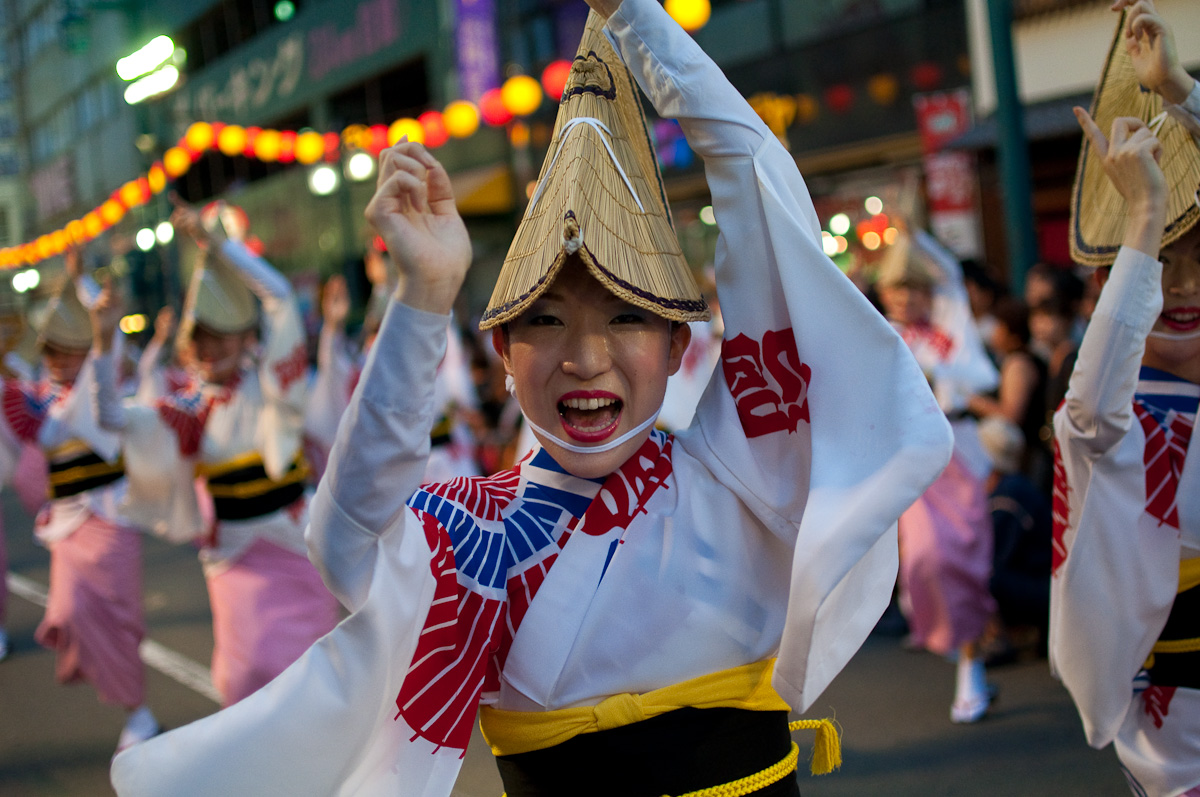
Awa Odori in Tokushima

Danjiri Matsuri in Sakai

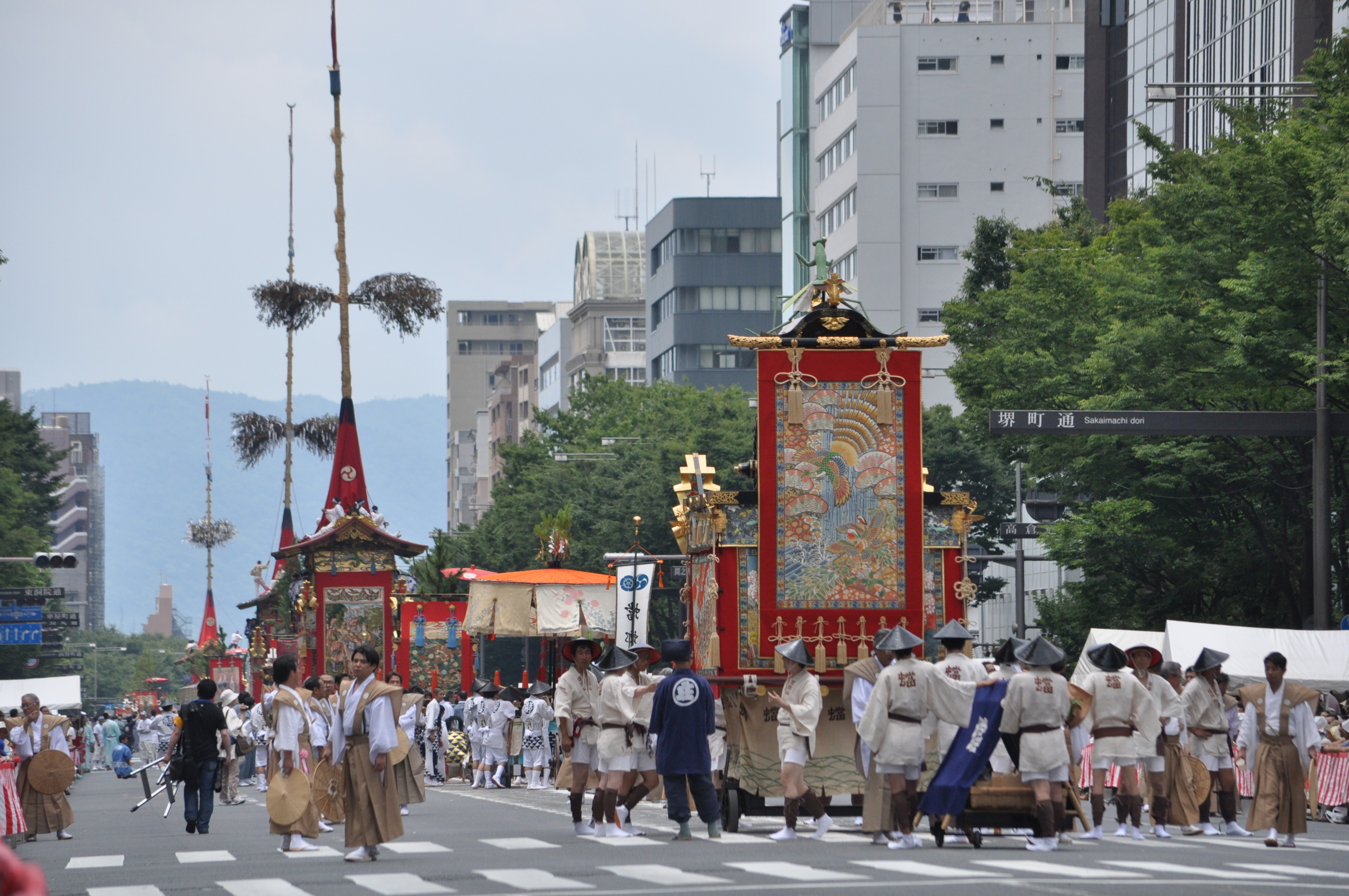
Gion Matsuri in Kyoto

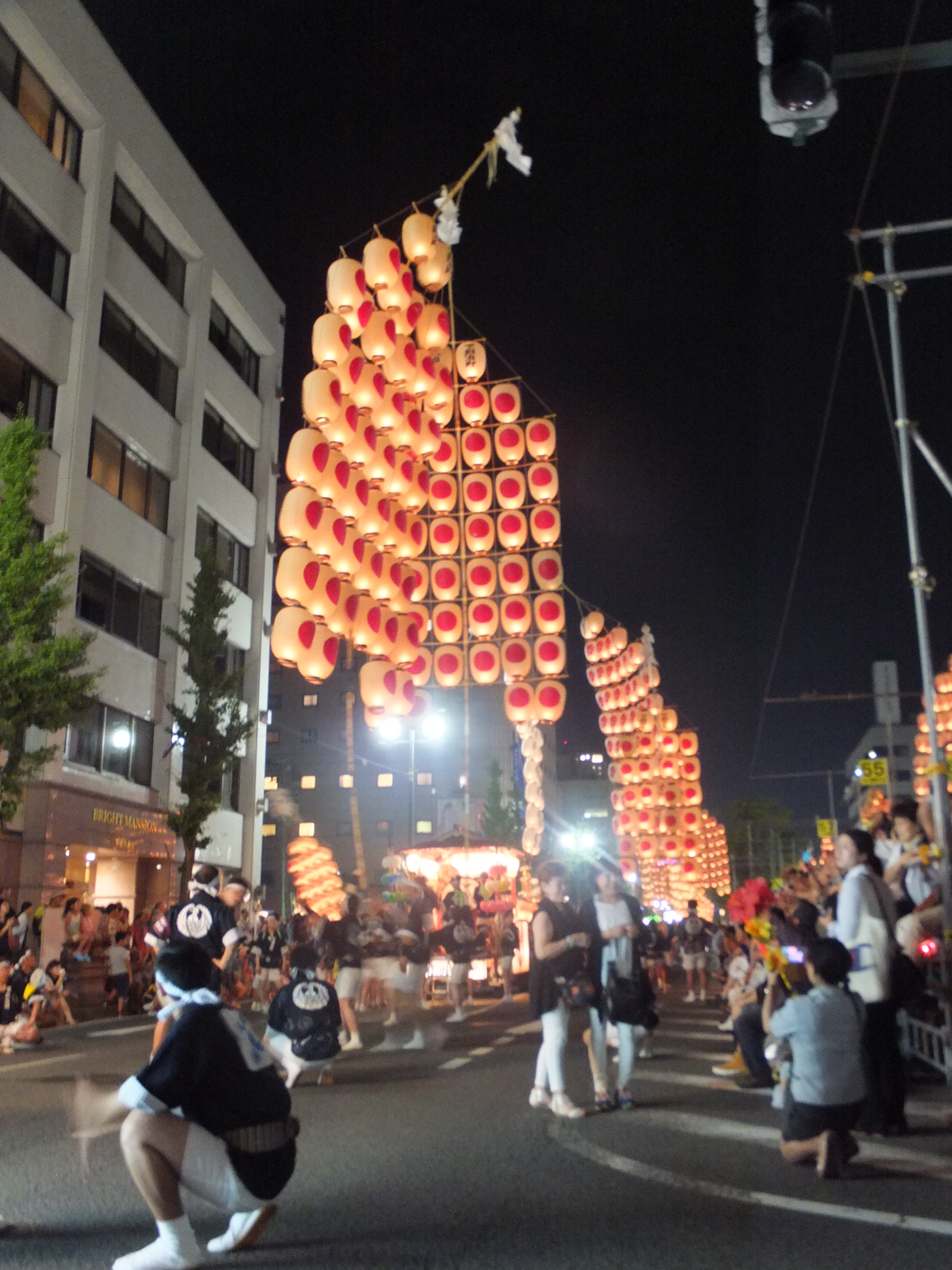
Kantō Matsuri in Akita, Akita

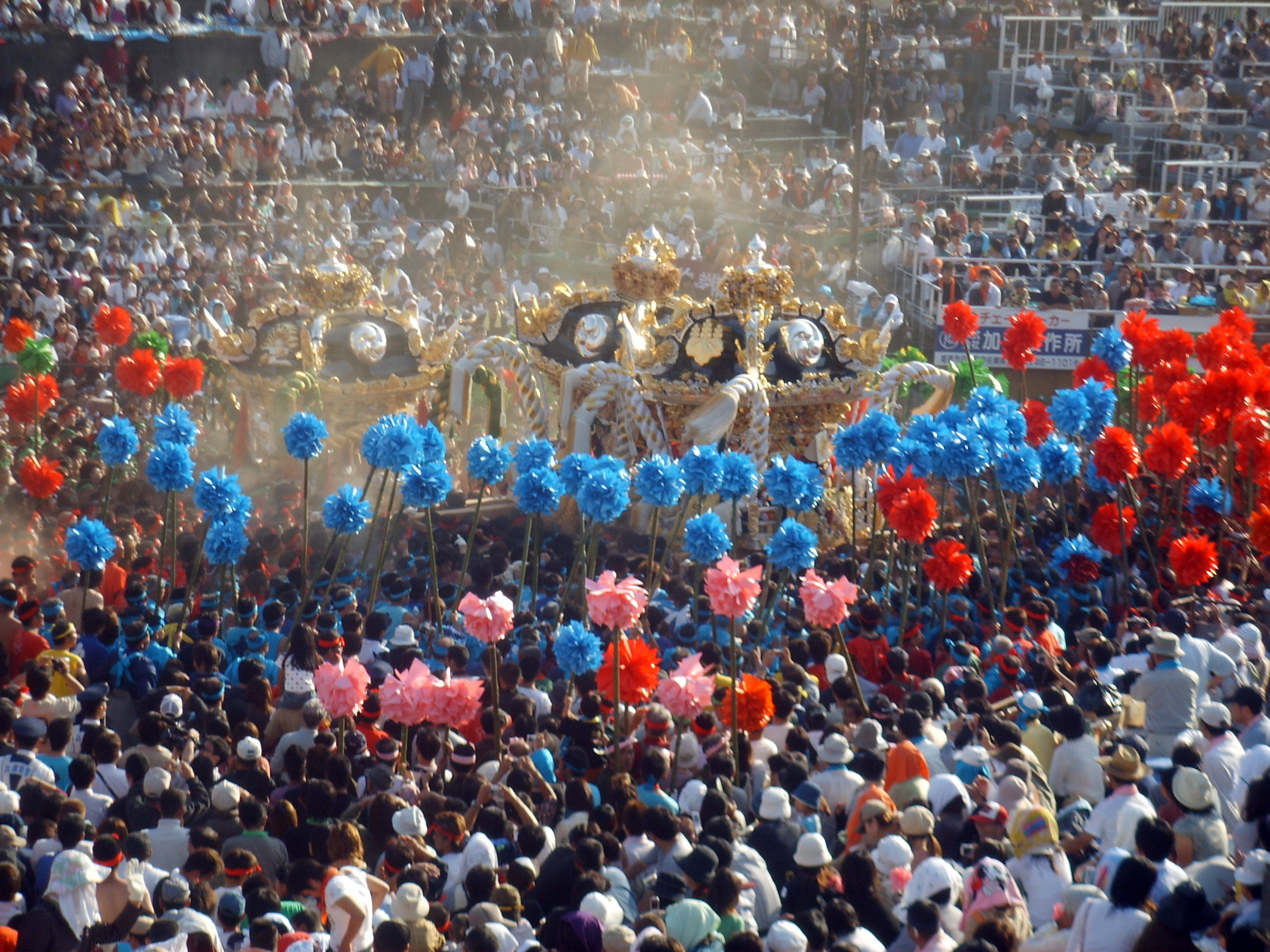
Mikoshi fighting on Nada no Kenka Matsuri (ja) in Himeji

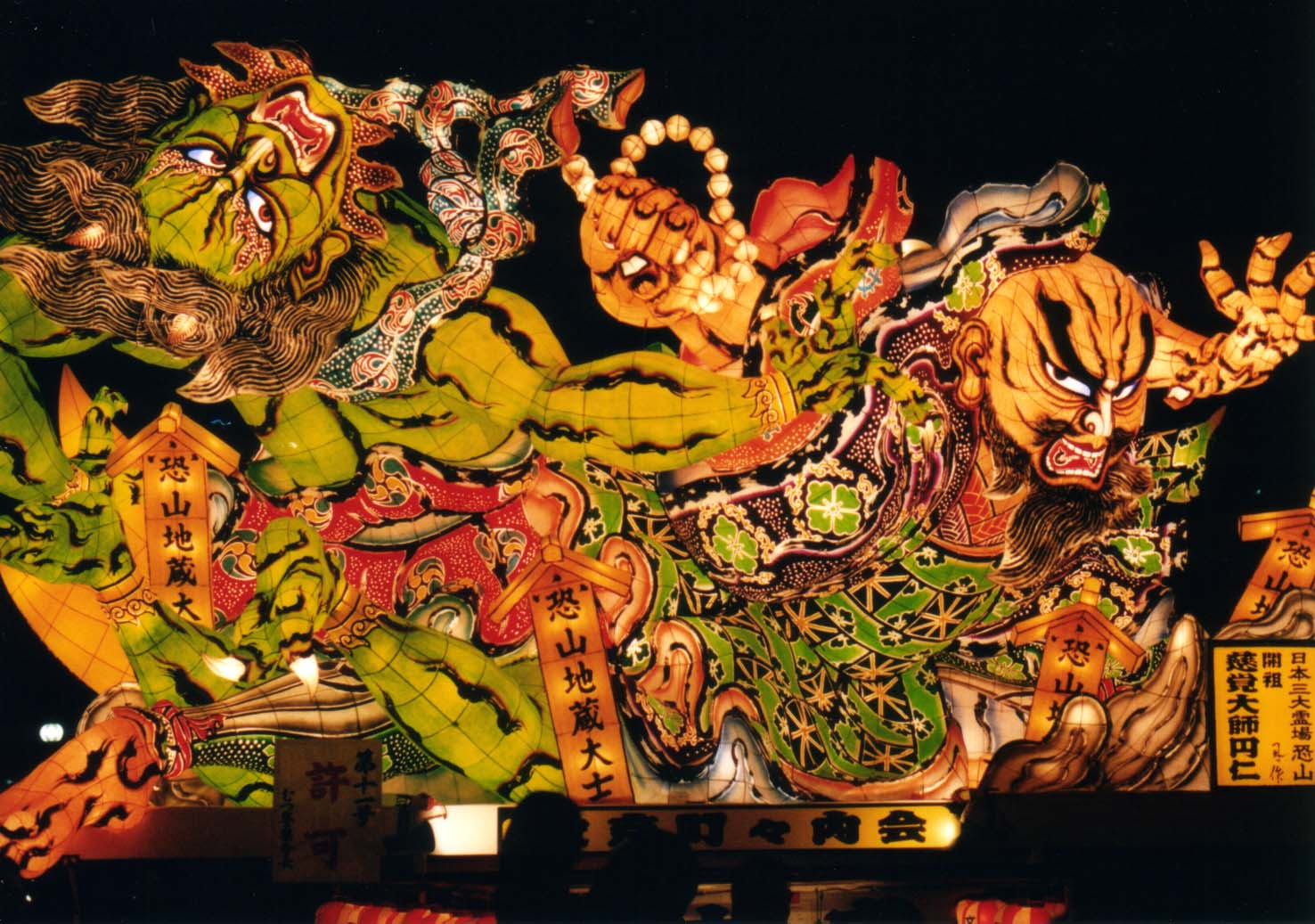
Nebuta Matsuri in Aomori

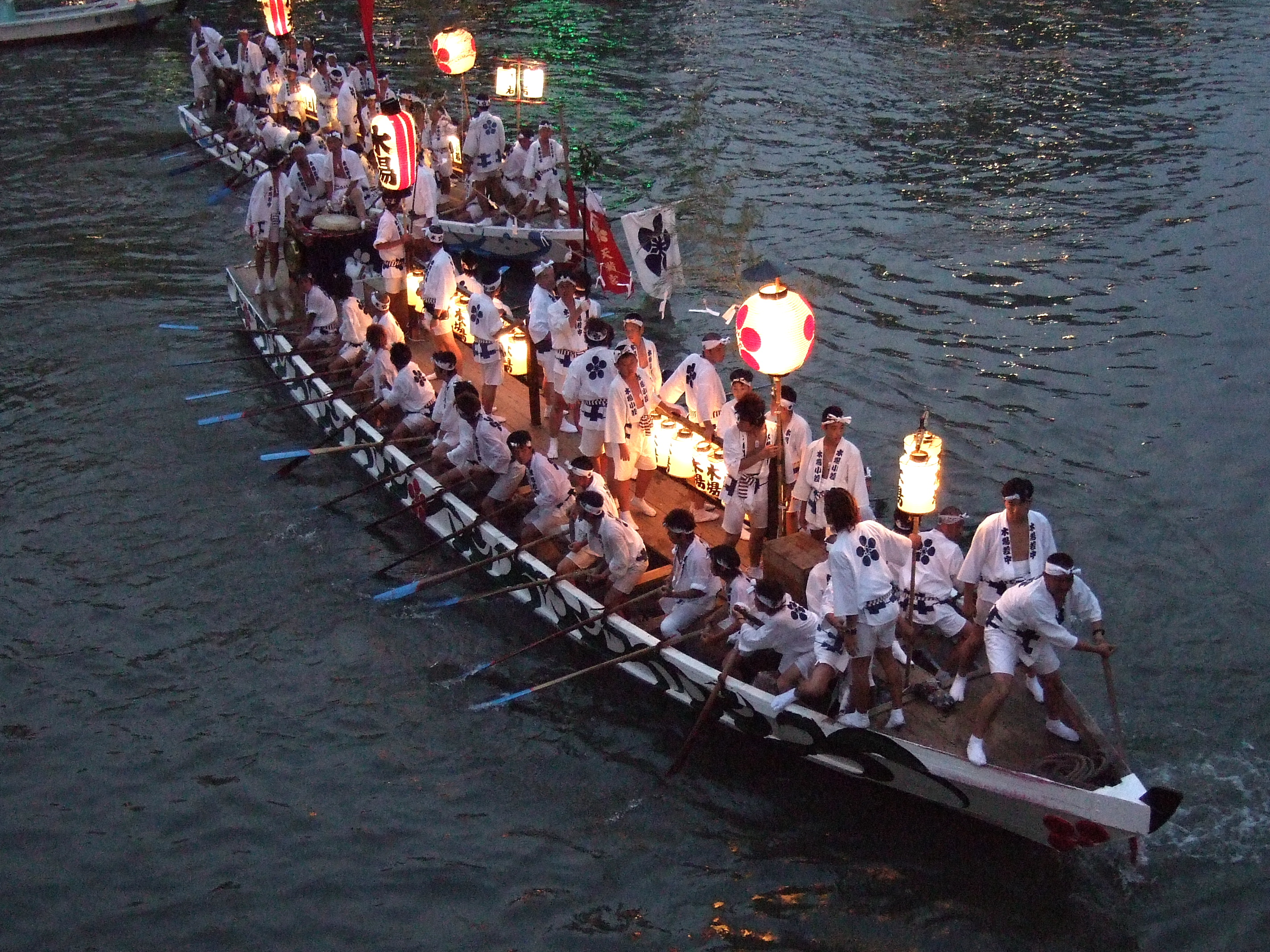
Tenjin Matsuri in Osaka

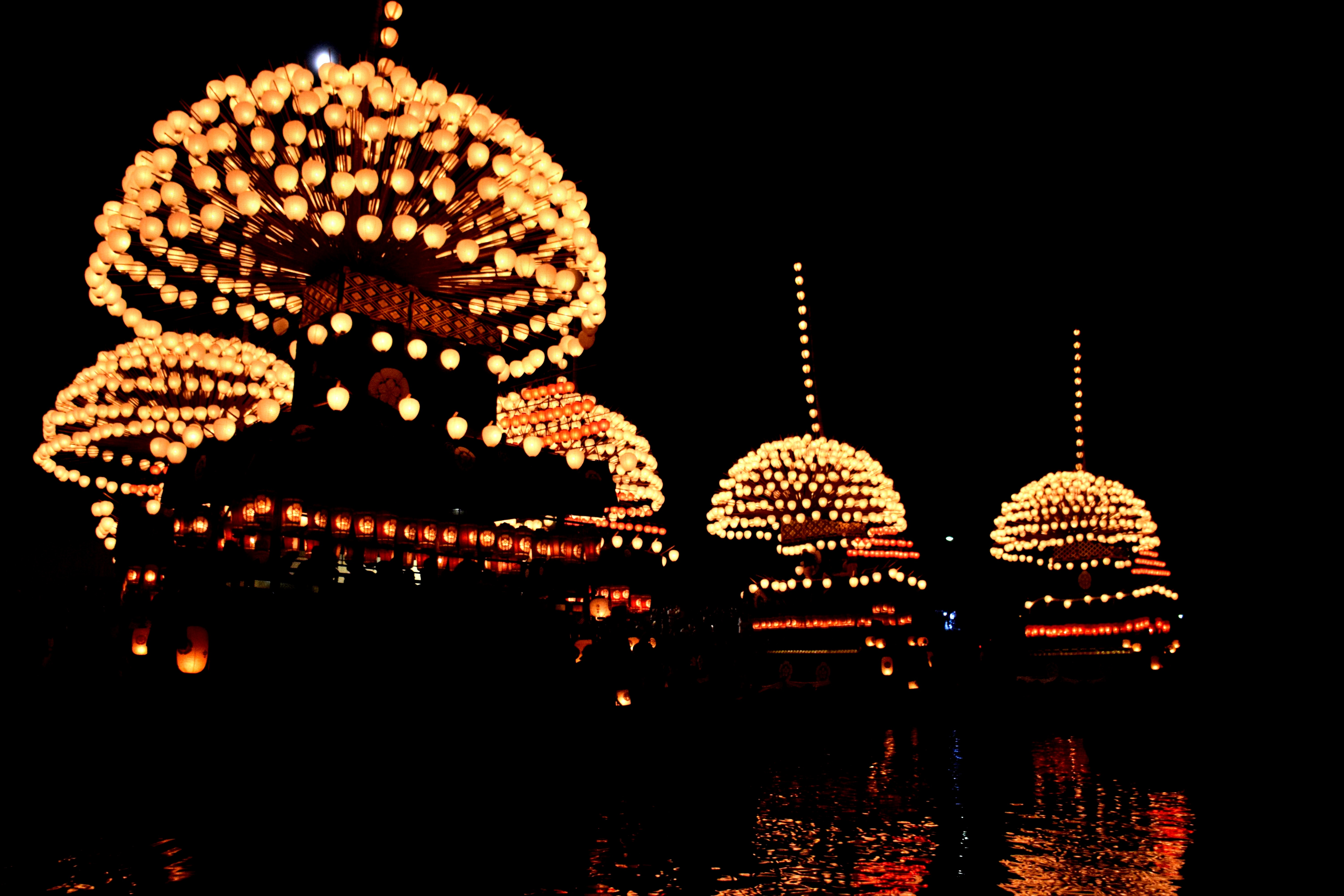
Tenno Matsuri in Tsushima, Aichi

Wakakusa Yamayaki, an annual festival during which the grass on the hillside of Mount Wakakusayama is set on fire

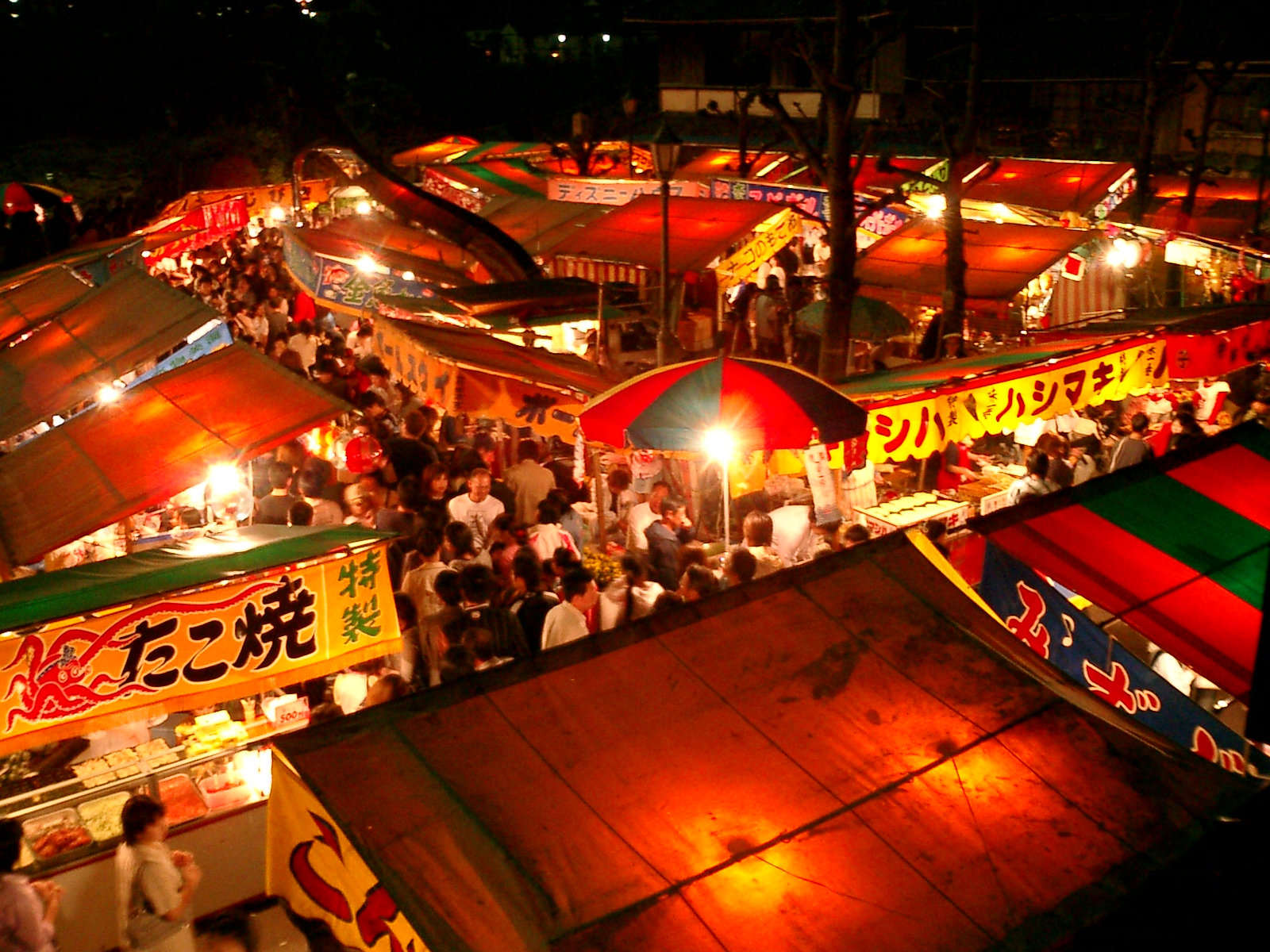
Stalls selling food or toys are a familiar sight at festivals throughout Japan.

Name Matsuri	Note	Place
Aoi	Held at Shimogamo Shrine and Kamigamo Shrine in May	Kyoto
Atsuta	Held at Atsuta Shrine in June	Nagoya
Awa Odori	Held at Tokushima, Tokushima in August	Tokushima, Tokushima
Dontaku	Held on 3–4 May	Fukuoka
Gion	Held in July	Kyoto
Hadaka	Held in February	Okayama
Hakata Gion Yamakasa	Held at Kushida-jinja in July	Fukuoka
Hōnen	Held at Tagata Shrine in March	Komaki
Jidai	Held on October 22	Kyoto
Kanamara	Held at Kanayama shrine in April	Kawasaki
Kanda	Held at Kanda Myojin shrine in May	Tokyo
Kanto	Held on August 3–7	Akita
Kishiwada Danjiri	held in September	Kishiwada
Kumagaya Uchiwa Festival	held on July 19–23	Saitama
Nagasaki Kunchi	held on 7–9 October	Nagasaki
Miki Autumn Harvest Festival	held at Ōmiya Hachiman Shrine in October	Miki
Nada no Kenka (ja)	held at Matsubara Hachiman Shrine in October 14–15	Himeji
Nagoya	held in Hisaya Ōdori Park in Sakae, Nagoya	Nagoya
Nebuta	held from August 2–7	Aomori
Ojima Neputa Festival	held on August 14–15	Gunma
Sanja	held at Asakusa Shrine in May	Tokyo
Sannō	held at Hie Shrine in June	Tokyo
Tanabata	held on 6–8 August	Sendai
Tenjin	held at Ōsaka Tenman-gū in July	Osaka
Wakakusa Yamayaki	held at Nara in fourth Saturday of January	Nara
Yosakoi Matsuri	held in Kōchi in August	Kōchi
Yotaka	held at Tonami, Toyama in June	Toyama

=== Sapporo Snow Festival (Hokkaido) ===
Sapporo Snow Festival is one of the largest festivals of the year in Sapporo, held in February for one week. It began in 1950 when high school students built snow statues in Odori Park, central Sapporo. The event is now very large and commercialized. About a dozen large sculptures are built for the festival along with around 100 smaller snow and ice sculptures. Several concerts and other events are also held.

=== Lake Towada Snow Festival ===
This lake festival is held in the beginning of February. Held in the town of Yasumiya, this festival is on the south side of Lake Towada (near the wooden statues). This festival is open all day, but at 5 pm one can enjoy activities such as going through a snow maze, exploring a Japanese igloo, and eat foods from Aomori and Akita prefectures. There is a fireworks show and events held on an ice stage.

=== Aomori Nebuta Festival ===
This festival is held annually and features colorful lantern floats called nebuta which are pulled through the streets of Central Aomori. This festival is held from about August 2–7 every year. This event attracts millions of visitors. During this festival, 20 large nebuta floats are paraded through the streets near Aomori JR rail station. These floats are constructed of wooden bases and metal frames. Japanese papers, called washi, are painted onto the frames. These amazing floats are finished off with the historical figures or kabuki being painted on the paper. These floats can take up to a year to complete. There is a dance portion of this festival. There are haneto dancers and they wear special costumes for this dance. Everyone is welcome to purchase their own haneto costume that they may too join in on the fun (Mishima, Aomori Nebuta Festival).

=== Nango Summer Jazz Festival ===
This event is held every year. Thousands of artists from all over Tohoku and even further regions come to Nango to perform. This is the largest open-air jazz concert held in Tohoku region. This festival began in 1989, in a small venue indoors. There was such a large response from the fans that it was expanded into a large annual festival. One must purchase tickets for this event (Bernard, 2007). This summer jazz festival does not cost anything but potential members of the public still need to receive a ticket to enter the event.

=== Cherry blossom festivals ===
Japan celebrates the entire season of the cherry blossoms. There are festivals in nearly every region of Japan, and some locations, food is available or a park may be decorated with lanterns. Some locations of cherry blossom festivals include:

- Yaedake Cherry Blossom Festival in Okinawa. This festival takes place from late January – mid February
- Matsuyama Shiroyama Koen Cherry Blossom Festival in Matsuyama-city, Ehime. This festival takes place early April.
- Matsue Jozan Koen Festival in Matsue-city, Shimane. This festival has a feature of illuminating the cherry blossom trees at night. This festival takes place late March-early April.
- Tsuyama Kakuzan Koen Cherry Blossom Festival in Tsuyama-city, Okayama. Japanese tea ceremonies and music performers are held at these festivals. This festival is held early-mid April.
- Takato Joshi Koen Cherry Blossom Festival in Takato-machi Ina-city, Nagano prefecture. The trees in this region have pink blossoms. This festival is held early April.
- Takada Koen Cherry Blossom Festival in Joetsu-city, Niigata prefecture. This festival is held early-mid April.
- Kitakai Tenshochi Cherry Blossom Festival in Kitakami-city, Iwate. This festival is held mid April-early May.
- Hirosaki Cherry Blossom Festival held in Hirosaki Koen Hirosaki-city, Aomori prefecture. This festival is held late April-early May (Mishima, Cherry Blossom Festivals 2010).

== Outside Japan ==
Following the Japanese diaspora, many places around the world celebrate similar festivals, often called matsuri. Brazil hosts the largest nikkei population in the world and some Brazilian cities host matsuri such as São Paulo and Curitiba. The United States host the 2nd largest nikkei population in the world and some American cities host matsuri such as Los Angeles, San Jose and Phoenix. Wales has adopted the term matsuri to name their yearly drift festival. It uses the Japanese name to show the sports Japanese heritage. The event takes place over 2 days at the Anglesey Track, and has been annual for 6 years.

== Nationwide festivals ==
=== Fixed days ===
- Seijin Shiki: Coming of Age Day (second Monday of January)
- Hinamatsuri: Doll Festival (March 3)
- Hanami: Flower Viewing (late March to early May)
- Hanamatsuri: Flower Festival (April 8)
- Tanabata: Star Festival (July 7)
- Shichi-Go-San: festival day for children aged seven, five and three (November 15)
- Ōmisoka: New Year's Eve (December 31)

=== Multiple days ===
- Setsubun: division of season (beginning of each of the four seasons) (February 3)
- Ennichi: temple fair (holidays related to Kami and/or Buddha)

=== Bunka ===
- Japanese Cultural Festival

=== New Year (正月, Shōgatsu) ===
Date: January 1–3 (related celebrations take place throughout January)

Other Names: Oshōgatsu (O is an honorific prefix)

Information: New Year observances are the most elaborate of Japan's annual events. Before the New Year, homes are cleaned, debts are paid off, and osechi (food in lacquered trays for the New Year) is prepared or bought. Osechi foods are traditional foods which are chosen for their lucky colors, shapes, or lucky-sounding names in hopes of obtaining good luck in various areas of life during the new year. Homes are decorated and the holidays are celebrated by family gatherings, visits to temples or shrines, and formal calls on relatives and friends. The first day of the year (ganjitsu) is usually spent with members of the family.

People try to stay awake and eat toshikoshi soba, noodles to be eaten at midnight. People also visit Buddhist temples and Shinto shrines. Traditionally three are visited. This is called sansha-mairi. In the Imperial Palace at dawn on the 1st, the Emperor performs the rite of shihōhai (worship of the four-quarters), in which he offers prayers for the well-being of the nation. On January 2 the public is allowed to enter the inner palace grounds; the only other day this is possible is the Emperor's birthday (February 23). On the 2nd and 3rd days acquaintances visit one another to extend greetings (nenshi) and sip otoso (a spiced rice wine). Some games played at New Year's are karuta (a card game), hanetsuki (similar to badminton), tako age (kiteflying), and komamawashi (spinning tops). These games are played to bring more luck for the year. Exchanging New Year's greeting cards (similar to Christmas Cards) is another important Japanese custom. Also special allowances are given to children, which are called otoshidama. They also decorate their entrances with kagami mochi (two mochi rice balls placed one on top of the other, with a tangerine on top), and kadomatsu (pine tree decorations).

A later New Year's celebration, Koshōgatsu, literally means "Small New Year" and starts with the first full moon of the year (around January 15). The main events of Koshōgatsu are rites and practices praying for a bountiful harvest.

=== Doll Festival (雛祭り, Hina-matsuri) ===
Date: March 3

Other Names: Sangatsu Sekku (3rd month Festival), Momo Sekku (Peach Festival), Joshi no Sekku (Girls' Festival)

Information: This is the day when families pray for the happiness and prosperity of their girls to help ensure that they grow up healthy and beautiful. The celebration takes place both inside the home and at the seashore. Both parts are meant to ward off evil spirits from girls and women. Young girls and women put on their best kimono and visit their friends' homes. Tiered platforms for hina ningyō (hina dolls; a set of dolls representing the emperor, empress, attendants, and musicians in ancient court dress) are set up in the home, and the family celebrates with a special meal of hishimochi (diamond-shaped rice cakes) and shirozake (rice malt with sake).

=== Hanami (花見) ===
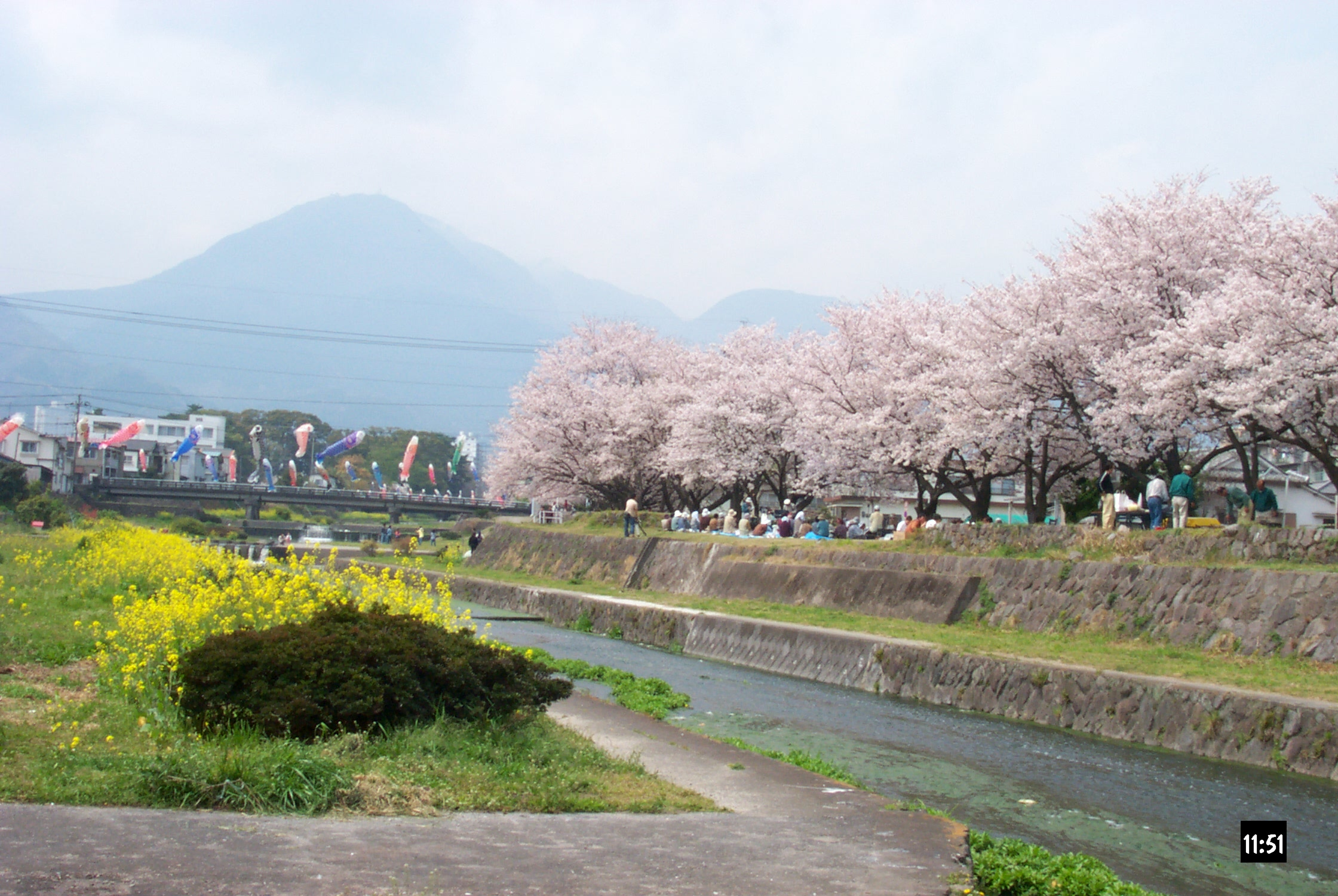
Hanami party along the Sakai River in Beppu, Oita

Date: April

Other Names: Hanami (flower viewing), Cherry Blossom Festival

Information: Various flower festivals are held at Shinto shrines during the month of April. Excursions and picnics for enjoying flowers, particularly cherry blossoms are also common, as well as many drinking parties often to be seen in and around auspicious parks and buildings. In some areas the peach blossom, the traditional flower of Japan (the Cherry being a symbol from the Edo period symbolizing the Samurai culture), is viewed as well though these flowers earlier than the Cherry. In some places flower viewing parties are held on traditionally fixed dates. This is one of the most popular events during spring. The subject of flower viewing has long held an important place in literature, dance, and fine arts. Ikebana (flower arrangement) is also a popular part of Japanese culture and is still practiced by many people today. Some main things people do during this event are games, folk songs, folk dance, flower displays, rides, parades, concerts, kimono shows, booths with food and other things, beauty pageant, and religious ceremonies. Families go out during weekends to see the cherry blossoms, and participate in the many festivals and activities.

=== Hanamatsuri (花祭り) ===
Date: April 8

Other Names: Flower Festival
Information: Hanamatsuri celebrates the birth of the Buddha. On this day, all temples hold 降誕会 (Gōtan-e), 仏生会 (Busshō-e), 浴仏会 (Yokubutsu-e), 龍華会 (Ryūge-e) and 花会式 (Hana-eshiki). Japanese people pour ama-cha (a beverage prepared from a variety of hydrangea) on small Buddha statues decorated with flowers, as if bathing a newborn baby. The tradition of bathing the Buddha originated in China and was introduced to Japan where it was first held in Nara in 606. Lion dancing is also a major tradition practiced during Buddha's Birthday and has become associated with the festival in Japan.

=== Tanabata (七夕) ===
Date: July 7 / August 5–8 (Sendai)

Other Names: The Star Festival
Information: It originated from a Chinese folk legend concerning two stars-the Weaver Star (Vega) and the Cowherd Star (Altair)-who were said to be lovers who could meet only once a year on the 7th night of the 7th month provided it did not rain and flood the Milky Way. It was named Tanabata after a weaving maiden from a Japanese legend, named Orihime who was believed to make clothes for the gods. People often write wishes and romantic aspirations on long, narrow strips of colored paper and hang them on bamboo branches along with other small ornaments.

=== Japanese Floating Lantern Festival (灯籠流し, Tōrō nagashi) ===
Date: July 19

Information: One traditional custom to mark the end of the Bon Festival. Small paper lanterns containing a burning flame are either set afloat to a river, lake or sea or they are let go and float away into the night. Their light is intended to guide the way for deceased family members' spirits. Usually the person who lets the lantern go will write a message on the side.

=== Bon Festival (盆, bon) ===
Date: August 13–16

Information: A Buddhist observance honoring the spirits of ancestors. Usually a "spirit altar" (shōryōdana) is set up in front of the Butsudan (buddhist altar) to welcome the ancestors' souls. A priest may be asked to come and read a sutra (tanagyō). Among the traditional preparations for the ancestors' return are the cleaning of grave sites. The welcoming fire (mukaebi) built on the 13th and the send-off fire (okuribi) built on the 15th and 16th are intended to guide the ancestor's spirits back to their permanent dwelling place.

=== Momijigari (紅葉狩) ===
Date: October-

Information: The Japanese tradition of going to visit scenic areas where leaves have turned red in the Autumn. The tradition is said to have originated in the Heian era as a cultured pursuit.

=== Pocky no Hi (ポッキーの日) ===
Date: November 11

Information: The Japanese tradition of buying and eating Pocky sticks.

=== "7-5-3" Festival (七五三, Shichi-Go-San) ===
Date: November 15

Information: Three- and seven-year-old girls and five-year-old boys are taken to the local shrine to pray for their safe and healthy future. This festival started because of the belief that children of certain ages were especially prone to bad luck and hence in need of divine protection. Children are usually dressed in traditional clothing for the occasion and after visiting the shrine many people buy chitose-ame ("thousand-year candy") sold at the shrine.

=== Preparation for the New Year and Year-end fair ===
Date: late December

Other Names: Year-end (年の瀬, toshi no se), Year-end Fair (年の市, Toshi no Ichi)

Information: Preparations for seeing in the new year were originally undertaken to greet the toshigami, or deity of the incoming year. These begin on December 13, when the house was given a thorough cleaning; the date is usually nearer the end of the month now. The house is then decorated in the traditional fashion: A sacred rope of straw (shimenawa) with dangling white paper strips (shide) is hung over the front door to prevent evil spirits from entering and to show the presence of the toshigami. It is also customary to place kadomatsu, an arrangement of tree sprigs, beside the entrance way. A special altar, known as toshidana ("year shelf"), is piled high with kagamimochi (flat, round rice cakes), sake (rice wine), persimmons, and other foods in honor of the toshigami. A fair is traditionally held in late December at shrines, temples or in local neighborhoods. This is in preparation for the new year holidays. Decorations and sundry goods are sold at the fair. Originally these year-end fairs provided opportunities for farmers, fisherfolk and mountain dwellers to exchange goods and buy clothes and other necessities for the coming year.

=== Ōmisoka (大晦日, Ōmisoka) ===
Date: December 31 (New Year's Eve)

Information: People do the general house cleaning (Ōsōji) to welcome coming year and not to keep having impure influences. Many people visit Buddhist temples to hear the temple bells rung 108 times at midnight (joya no kane). This is to announce the passing of the old year and the coming of the new. The reason they are rung 108 times is because of the Buddhist belief that human beings are plagued by 108 earthly desires or passions (bonnō). With each ring one desire is dispelled. It is also a custom to eat toshikoshi soba in the hope that one's family fortunes will extend like the long noodles.

== See also ==
- List of festivals in Japan
- Abare Festival
- Culture of Japan
- Naked festival
- Japanese calendar
- Jinjitsu and Nanakusa-no-sekku
- Subaru Cherry Blossom Festival of Greater Philadelphia
- National Cherry Blossom Festival, Washington, D.C.
- Kōhaku maku
- Sakai Matsuri
