= Sichuan (disambiguation) =

Sichuan (Chinese: 四川, lit. '4 Rivers'; Mandarin Chinese: ㄙˋ ㄔㄨㄢ, romanized: Sìchuān; "Si-cuan" from Sichuanese) is a province of the People's Republic of China, spelled as "Szechwan" during the Imperial era, and "Szechuan" during the Republic.

Si-chuan, Sichuan, Si Chuan, Sze-chwan, Szechwan, Sze Chwan, Sze-chuan, Szechuan, Sze Chuan, Si-cuan, Sicuan, Si Cuan, may also refer to:

== Places ==
- Sichuan (Yuan province), a 14th-century province of the Yuan Dynasty of China, covering part of modern Sichuan
- Sichuan Military District, People's Republic of China
- Diocese of Szechuan, Anglican Church of China
- 2215 Sichuan, the asteroid Sichuan, the 2215th asteroid registered, a Main Belt asteroid
- Sichuan Basin, a lowland basin in China, covering parts Sichuan and Chongqing
- Sichuan River, a river in China flowing through Sichuan and Chongqing

== People, figures, characters ==
- Governor of Sichuan, provincial governor
- Viceroy of Szechwan, imperial governor-general
- Lord of Sichuan, a mythological god
- Li Sichuan (born 1958), Taiwanese politician

== Other uses ==
- Sichuan Airlines (callsign: Si Chuan), a Chinese airline
- Sichuan University, Chengdu, Sichuan, China
- Sichuan Trust, a trust, a non-bank financial institution, based in Chengdu, Sichuan, China
- Sichuan F.C., a soccer team from Chengdu, Sichuan, China

== See also ==
- Sichuan Province (computer game) (Japanese: 四川省, romanized: Shisen-shō), a Japanese solitaire tile matching game with mahjong tiles
- Sichuan earthquake, a list of quakes
- Szechwan Invasion, Second Sino-Japanese War
- Sichuan cuisine, the cuisine of the Chinese province
- Sichuan pepper, a spice
- Sacheon (泗川|), a Korean city
- Four rivers (disambiguation) (Mandarin Chinese: 四川, romanized: Si Chuan, lit. '4 Rivers')
- Shisen (disambiguation) (Japanese: 四川, lit. '4 Rivers')
- Chuan (disambiguation)
- Si (disambiguation)
