= Harry Pickens =

American jazz musician

- Born: Brunswick, Georgia
- Genre: Jazz
- Occupations: Musician
- Instruments: Piano
- Years active: 1980–

Harry Pickens is an American jazz pianist. He began his career with the Johnny Griffin quartet and Chico Freeman quintet, later performing with Blue Note Records group Out of the Blue before releasing several albums as leader.

He is the author of In Tune: Lessons In Life From A Life In Music.

He is a winner of the Kentucky Governor's Award In The Arts and the Fund For The Arts Lifetime Achievement Award. He serves as Artist-In-Residence for the Kentucky Governor's School For The Arts, and has also been featured in an Emmy-nominated documentary, Harry Pickens In The Garden of Music, produced by Kentucky Educational Television.

Pickens has also been a mainstay feature at the Idyllwild Arts Jazz in the Pines festival each year in August through 2018, with the West Coast version of the Harry Pickens Trio comprising Pickens, Marshall Hawkins (bass) and Harold Mason (drums).

Pickens has collaborated with John Abercrombie, Eric Alexander, David Baker, Keter Betts, Art Blakey, Terrence Blanchard, Don Braden, Avery Brooks, Conte Candoli, Pete Candoli, Ron Carter, Jerry Coker, Buddy Collette, Todd Coolman, Eddie "Lockjaw" Davis, Lou Donaldson, Ted Dunbar, Harry "Sweets" Edison, Yve Evans, Jon Faddis, Art Farmer, Ricky Ford, Chico Freeman, Curtis Fuller, Kenny Garrett, Dizzy Gillespie, Benny Golson, Slide Hampton, Marshall Hawkins, Jeff Hamilton, Scott Hamilton, Joe Henderson, Billy Higgins, Freddie Hubbard, Robert Hurst, Bobby Hutcherson, Milt Jackson, Herb Jeffreys, Clifford Jordan, Dave Liebman, Mundell Lowe, Marian McPartland, Delfeayo Marsalis, Cecil McBee, Jackie McLean, Charles McPherson, James Moody, Lewis Nash, Jack Petersen, Ralph Peterson, Marcus Printup, Rufus Reid, Wallace Roney, Lynn Seaton, Bobby Shew, Marvin "Smitty" Smith, James Spaulding, Byron Stripling, Steve Turre, Freddie Waits, Kenny Washington, Bobby Watson, Sharrie Williams, Phil Woods.

== Discography ==
=== As leader/co-leader ===
- Live at Stem Concert Hall, Vol. 1 (Double-Time – DTRCD-133, 1998) – live
- Passionate Ballads (Double-Time – DTRCD-146, 1998)
- Very Early with Alexis Cole (CD Baby, 1999)
- I'll Be Seeing You (Harry Pickens Music, 2003)
- The Shadow Of Your Smile (Harry Pickens Music, 2008)
- Lumina (SonaBlast, 2023)

=== As a member ===
Rutgers University Livingston College Jazz Ensemble

- Music of the Masters with Clifford Jordan (R.J.E./P.J., 1980)

Out of the Blue

- Out of the Blue (Blue Note, 1985)
- Inside Track (Blue Note, 1986)
- Live at Mt. Fuji (Blue Note, 1987) – live rec. at the Mount Fuji Jazz Festival 1986 at Lake Yamanaka, Japan

=== As sideman ===
- Johnny Griffin & Eddie "Lockjaw" Davis, Tough Tenors Back Again! (Storyville, 1997) –reissued as In Copenhagen, Storyville, 2007)
