= Wolson =

Wolson is a surname. Notable people with the surname include:

- Joshua Wolson (born 1974), American lawyer

== See also ==
- Chon Wolson (born 1958), Korean soprano in Japan (surname Chon, given name Wolson)
- Colson
- Olson (surname)
- Polson (surname)
- Wolfson
