= Chuan =

Chuan may refer to:

- Quan, a Chinese surname
- Chuan (food), a food originating in Xinjiang
- Abbreviation for Sichuan

== See also ==
- Chuanqi (disambiguation)
