= Chon (disambiguation) =

Chon often refers to Chonan languages.

Chon may also refer to:

== Places ==
- Heaven Lake, a volcanic crater lake on the border of China and North Korea also known as Lake Chon
- Loch Chon, a lake in Scotland
- Water of Chon, a waterway connected to Loch Chon

== Other uses ==
- CHON, a mnemonic acronym for the four most common elements in living organisms, a subset of CHNOPS
- Chon, a Japanese term for Koreans, generally assumed to be offensive
- Chon (album), 2019 self-titled album by Chon (band)
- Chon (band), an American progressive rock band
- Chon (name), a given name or surname
- CHON-FM, a radio station (98.1 FM) licensed to Whitehorse, Yukon, Canada
- Kopi luwak (Vietnamese: cà phê Chồn; a.k.a. Chồn Coffee), a type of coffee
- Chŏn, the subunit of the historical currency of the Korean Empire from 1902 to 1910
- Forces of Special Purpose (ChON), a military internal security force established by the Bolsheviks during the Russian Civil War

== See also ==
- Chons, the Ancient Egyptian god of the Moon
- Sympistis chons (S. chons) a species of moth
- Chonchon (disambiguation)
