= Chonchon (disambiguation) =

Chonchon may refer to:

- Chonchon, mythological creature of the Mapuche mythology
- Chonchón, mythological creature of the Chilean mythology
- Chonchon, familiarly nickname of Marie-François-Xavier, daughter of Jeanne Dupleix#Children from Mr. Vincens
- Chonchon County, kun, or county, in central Chagang province, North Korea
- Paul Chonchon, Guadelupean basketball player and trainer
  - Hall des Sports Paul Chonchon, Basketball stadion named after Paul Chonchon in Pointe-à-Pitre, Guadeloupe
- Taku no chonchon, List of Nikkatsu Roman Porno films

== See also ==
- Chon (disambiguation)
