= Nebuta Museum Wa Rasse =

Museum in Aomori, Japan

- ねぶたの家 ワ・ラッセ
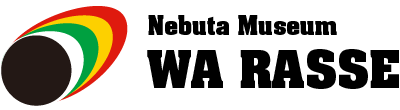

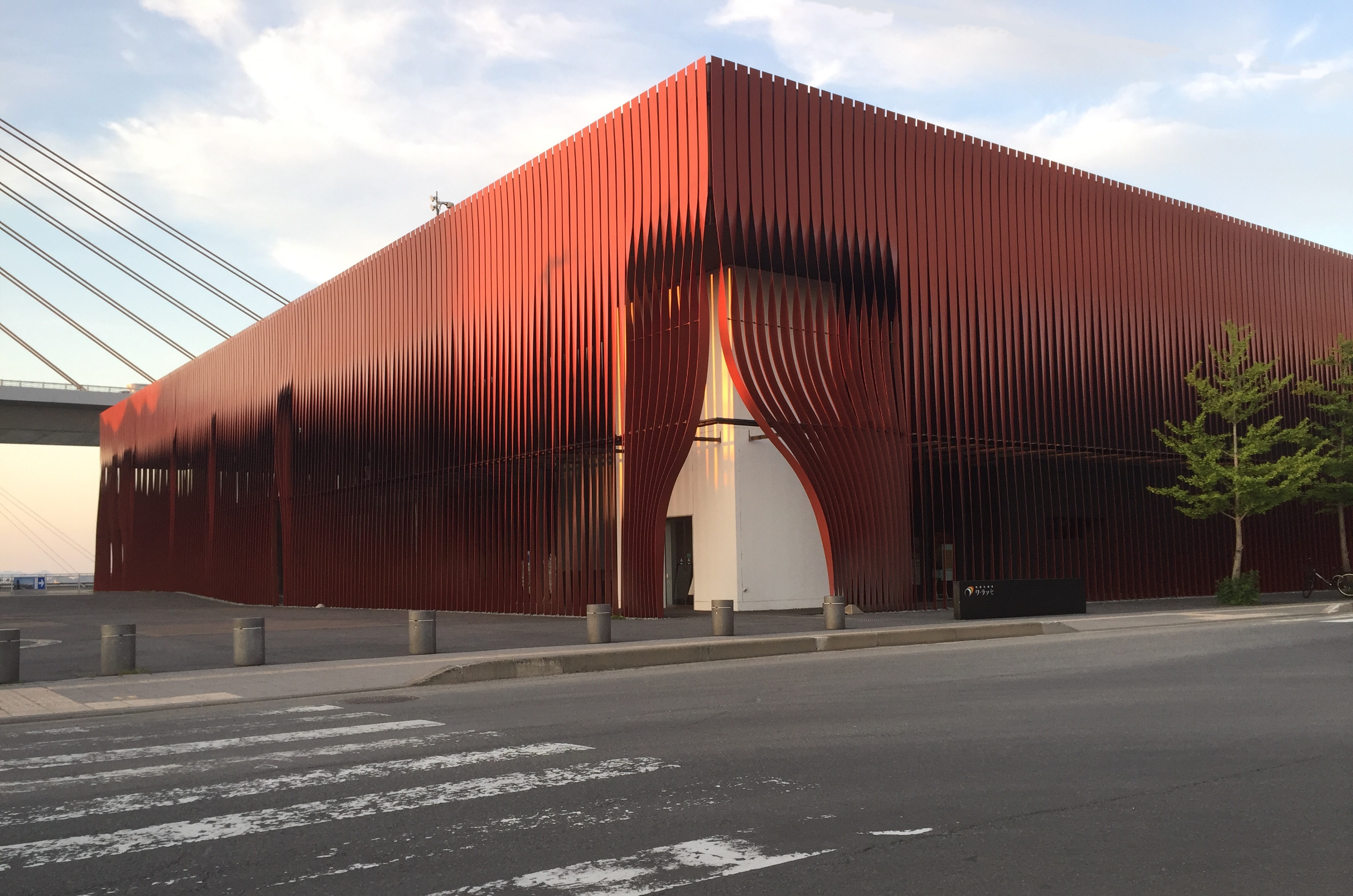
- The museum in May 2020
- Established: 5 January 2011
- Location: 1-1-1, Yasukata, Aomori, Aomori Prefecture, Japan
- Coordinates: 40°49′46.4″N 140°44′9.4″E
- Type: Art museum
- Owner: The city of Aomori
- Public transit access: Aomori Station
- Website: www.nebuta.jp/warasse

The Nebuta Museum Wa Rasse (ねぶたの家 ワ・ラッセ, Nebuta no ie Wa-Rasse) is a city-owned museum near Aomori Station in the city of Aomori in northern Japan. It displays a revolving exhibit of four Nebuta floats from the most recent Aomori Nebuta Matsuri summer festival, alongside media related to the festival. The museum opened in January 2011.

== History ==
The concept for Nebuta Museum Wa Rasse was part of the "Basic Plan for the Rejuvenation of the Aomori Station area" in 2004. The plan was devised to keep tourism and businesses present in central Aomori after the 2010 opening of the Tōhoku Shinkansen and Shin-Aomori Station that would supplant the Tōhoku Main Line and Aomori Station, leading to a potential shift in commuter traffic away from the city's central district. The plan called for a public cultural facility near Aomori Station that focused on the Aomori Nebuta Matsuri summer festival that takes place annually on the waterfront of Aomori Bay.

The name ねぶたの家 ワ・ラッセ (Nebuta no ie Wa-Rasse) was decided on in 2009. The building's exterior of red, ribbon-like, vertical steel beams was designed to evoke the visual sensation of light passing through Aomori's old-growth beech forests, as found in Shirakami-Sanchi, while controlling the amount of natural lighting that penetrated to the museum's interior. The museum was opened to the public on 5 January 2011. Another privately owned Aomori Nebuta museum in the foothills of the Hakkōda Mountains near National Route 103, called Nebuta no Sato, closed two years after the opening of Nebuta Museum Wa Rasse due to competition from the latter's more central location.

== Exhibits ==
A Nebuta float during one of the museum's "Haneto" experiences

The museum contains two floors of displays. Visitors start the tour of the museum on the second floor. The first exhibition area contains photographs and videos of the history of the Aomori Nebuta Matsuri festival. Guests can also participate in interactive activities in this first exhibition area. The second floor leads to a balcony that overlooks the museum's main exhibition area where large Nebuta floats are kept. Each year, four new Nebuta floats are selected for display in this exhibition area. Older floats are rotated out of the exhibit after the new ones are installed. The exhibition room is darkened so the floats can be lit to mimic their appearance during the festival.

The museum also provides a 30-minute-long "Haneto" experience three times daily, where guests can experience various aspects of the Aomori Nebuta Matsuri festival in the large exhibition area among the four Nebuta floats. The experience emulates the festival which was designated an Important Intangible Folk Cultural Property in 1980, and as one of the 100 Soundscapes of Japan by the Ministry of the Environment in 1996.
