= Alexis Cole =

American jazz singer

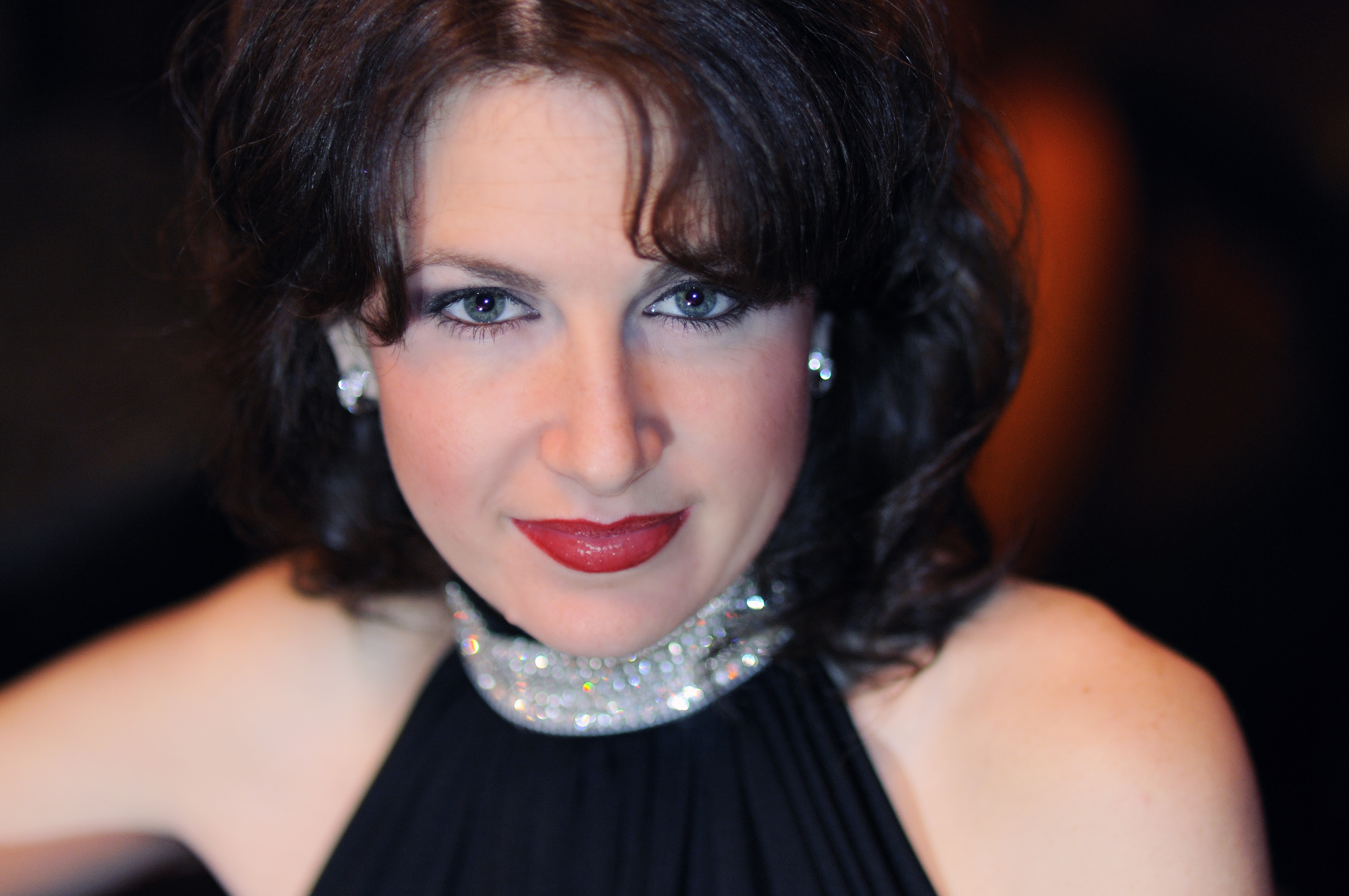

Background information
- Born: January 28, 1976 (age 50); Queens, New York, U.S.
- Genres: Jazz, swing
- Occupation: Singer
- Years active: 1999–present
- Labels: Venus, Motéma, Chesky, Zoho
- Website: www.alexiscole.com
- Military service
- Allegiance: United States
- Branch: United States Army
- Service years: 2009–2015
- Unit: USMA Band

Alexis Cole is an American jazz singer.

== Career ==
Cole was born in Queens, New York. Her father and grandmother were both popular music singers and pianists. Her mother was interested in business and helped her learn business skills and get music education and performance opportunities as a young person. She grew up in South Florida, where she studied Musical Theater at the New World School of the Arts in Miami. While in her senior year there, she began her professional career performing at a hotel in South Beach. This got her interested in singing Jazz. She attended the University of Miami but in her Junior year transferred to William Paterson University where she received her Bachelors of Music in 1998

Directly after college, she was an AmeriCorps volunteer for one year, and then went to study music in Mumbai, India with the Jazz India Vocal Institute.

In 2001 she lived and worked for a year aboard the Carnival Victory performing nightly with her quartet on piano and voice.

From 2002 to 2005 she traveled extensively in Europe, busking and hitchhiking, and participating annually in the Montreux Jazz Festival Vocal Competition which she eventually became the runner up.

Her debut album, Very Early (1999), was recorded with Harry Pickens and independently released, and her second album, Nearer the Sun (2004) was recorded with Ben Stivers.

In 2006, she received a Masters of Music from Queens College. She taught for one semester at a program in Quito, Ecuador, run by the Berklee College of Music.

Cole spent most of the next two years singing and playing piano at a lounge in Tokyo, Japan.

In 2009 she enlisted in the U.S. Army to become the lead singer for the West Point Band's Jazz Knights Big Band until 2015.

In 2016, she released a tribute to Paul Simon entitled Dazzling Blue, which debuted at No. 24 on the Billboard jazz chart.

After leaving the Army she became the Jazz Voice Professor at the State University of New York at Purchase.

In 2021 she took on a second position as Jazz Voice Professor at her alma mater William Paterson University.

In May 2020, amidst social distancing due to the Coronavirus Pandemic, she founded an online educational website to connect vocalists and students for virtual learning opportunities. Some of the singers teaching on the site include Karrin Allyson, Tierney Sutton, Cyrille Aimée, Kate McGarry, Jane Monheit, John Proulx, Jay Clayton, Dena DeRose and Catherine Russell.

In April 2021 along with Zeiders American Dream Theater www.thez.org, she co produced the first annual Virginia Beach Vocal Jazz Summit www.vocaljazzsummit.org Now occurring in person and virtually every first weekend of June, notable past performers include Samara Joy, Kurt Elling, Jane Monheit and Catherine Russell

In November 2021 she released Sky Blossom: Songs From My Tour of Duty, a Big Band album composed of the arrangements by Scott Arcangel that were written for her during her time in the West Point Band.

In May 2023 she resigned from her teaching positions at SUNY Purchase College and William Paterson University to work on a new enterprise, a website to help emerging musicians find long and mid term performing jobs. www.MusicAuditions.com

In 2024 she released her second big band album Jazz Republic: Taiwan, the United States and the Freedom of Swing, with the Taipei Jazz Orchestra conducted by Dr. Gene Aitken

== Discography ==
- Very Early (CD Baby, 1999) with Harry Pickens
- Nearer the Sun (Canopy Jazz, 2004)
- Zingaro (Canopy Jazz, 2007)
- Someday My Prince Will Come (Venus, 2009)
- The Greatest Gift: Songs of the Season (Motéma, 2009)
- You'd Be So Nice to Come Home to (Venus, 2010) with One For All
- I Carry Your Heart (Motéma, 2012) the Music of Pepper Adams
- Close Your Eyes (Venus, 2014)
- A Kiss in the Dark (Chesky, 2014)
- A Beautiful Friendship with Bucky Pizzarelli (Venus, 2015)
- Harold Mabern's album Afro Blue (Smoke Sessions, 2015) along with Gregory Porter, Nora Jones, Jane Monheit, and Kurt Elling
- Dazzling Blue: The Music of Paul Simon (Chesky, 2016)
- Sky Blossom: Songs from My Tour of Duty (Zoho, 2021)
- Jazz Republic: Taiwan, The United States and the Freedom of Swing (Tiger Turn, 2024) with the Taipei Jazz Orchestra
