= Out of the Blue (American band) =

American jazz band (1984–1989)

Out of the Blue (OTB) was an American jazz ensemble founded by Blue Note Records in the 1980s as a showcase for the label's younger musicians. The group was formed in 1984, releasing four albums and touring extensively over the next five years. Their most commercially successful album was 1986's Live at Mt. Fuji, which reached #9 on Billboard magazine's Top Jazz Albums chart. The lineup changed occasionally over this time, and the group disbanded in 1989 after its members moved on to solo careers.

== Members ==
- Michael Philip Mossman – trumpet
- Kenny Garrett, Steve Wilson – alto saxophone
- Ralph Bowen – tenor saxophone
- Harry Pickens, Renee Rosnes – piano
- Robert Hurst, Kenny Davis – bass
- Ralph Peterson Jr., Billy Drummond – drums

== Discography ==
- Out of the Blue (Blue Note, 1985)
- Inside Track (Blue Note, 1986)
- Live at Mt. Fuji (Blue Note, 1987) – live, recorded at the Mount Fuji Jazz Festival in 1986
- Spiral Staircase (Blue Note, 1989)
