= Chon (name) =

Chon is both a given name and a surname. Notable people with the name include:

== Given name or nickname ==
- Chon Day (Chauncey Addison Day, 1907–2000), American writer
- Chon Gallegos (born 1939), American football player
- Trần Văn Chơn (1920–2019), Republic of Vietnam Navy admiral
- Chon Romero (born c. 1940), Panamanian sportswriter
- Chon Noriega (born 1961), American art historian

== Surname ==
- Kilnam Chon (born 1943), South Korean computer scientist
- Chon Wolson (born 1958), Korean soprano in Japan
- Chon Un-ju (born 1970), North Korean sport shooter
- Chon Kye-young (born 1971), South Korean manhwa author
- Justin Chon (born 1981), American actor, director, and YouTube personality
- Chon Kyong-hwa (born 1983), North Korean footballer
- Chon Jong-won (born 1996), South Korean sport climber
- Katherine Chon, American anti-human-trafficking activist
