= Abare Festival =

Festival in Japan

Abare Festival is a Japanese festival commonly known as the Fire & Violence Festival. It takes place in Ushitsu of Noto Peninsula and is dedicated to the Yasaka Shrine. The festival takes place every year in July on the first Friday and Saturday of the month.

== Summary ==
Abare Festival is commonly referred to as "the Fire & Violence Festival". Visitors can watch kiriko (キリコ, Noto's unique illuminated lantern floats) and mikoshi (みこし, portable shrines) being carried through the streets, eat festival foods, hear taiko drums and see many people dressed in their summer festival wear (ゆかた).

The kirikos and mikoshis are first blessed by priests and sake is poured over them and into the mouths of the men who carry them. From this point onwards, sake flows freely all night long. The kiriko are sponsored by neighborhoods within Ushitsu and are usually carried by local residents, or former residents.,

The festival is held on the first Friday through Saturday of July every year (previously on July 7 and 8) as the first Noto kiriko festivals, which are held all over Noto, Ishikawa from July to September.

Abare festival is dedicated to Yasaka Shrine in Ushitsu. After kiriko are showcased in town streets, 40 giant kiriko are gathered at the pier, where huge bonfires are set, with melody of taiko drums, gongs, and flutes around the fire.

The purpose of this festival is to hustle bravely and violently as its name indicates. It is said that the more violently people behave, the more god will delight as this rampage represents enshrined Susanoo no Mikoto, who is known as a destructive deity.

== Detail ==
On the first night, Friday, of the festivities the Mikoshi and about 40 Kiriko make their way through the streets of Ushitsu (a village inside of Noto Town) and finally gather in front of the city hall to weave around large bonfires resting on the top of large poles. Groups of men (and rarely women) work together to carry the large wooden Kiriko while children sit atop it playing drums and flutes. The men often carry the Kiriko so close to the suspended bonfires that they suffer minor or major burns from the falling sparks. The children usually wear wet towels draped over their heads to protect them from the sparks.

On the second night, Saturday, the Kirikos once again weave their way around town but the main attraction is the wooden Mikoshis that are carried (by about 12 men) down the main street to be blessed. The men carrying the Mikoshi continually thrash it against the ground and grind it into the asphalt of the street, doing their best to break it as much as possible. After passing 3 different checkpoints where they stop to pray, receive blessings, and drink sake; the men will throw the Mikoshi off a small bridge (roughly 7 meters tall) into a small river that runs through the middle of town. The men will then jump into the river and bash the Mikoshi against the bridge's concrete support beam while splashing one another. Handling the Mikoshi these way means following the divine will, hence such rough handling is actually a manner of prayer. After that they will take the Mikoshi a short way up the road to a second river and throw the Mikoshi off the side of the road into the second river. At this point they will bash the Mikoshi up against a hard bit of the road to attempt to further shatter the top of the Mikoshi.

At the second river, a bonfire, which has been lit above them, showers sparks and flaming debris down upon their heads as they attempt to destroy the Mikoshi. The men vigorously splash one another to protect themselves from the fire. Then the men will retrieve the Mikoshi from the river and take it to Yasaka Shrine, a Shinto Shrine (じんじゃ). In front of the shrine there is a large bonfire on the ground in which they will repeatedly throw the Mikoshi and then retrieve it afterwards, when they believe that they have properly destroyed the Mikoshi they will take it through the gate of the shrine where the priests will judge if it has been properly destroyed. If the priests decline to take the Mikoshi into the shrine, the men will return to throwing it in and out of the bonfire and smashing it upon the ground before returning it to be inspected by the priests once more. Eventually the priests will accept the Mikoshi into the shrine. This happens twice, the first wooden Mikoshi being destroyed between 10:00 p.m. and 12:00 a.m. and the second between 12:00 a.m. and 2:00 a.m.

Despite the name, the Fire and Violence festival is safe to attend for all ages. The 12 men destroying the Mikoshi are the only ones that are in any danger of physical harm.

== Origin ==
Abare Festival originated around 1665 to counteract violent epidemic raging in Noto, Ishikawa. Local people invited Gozu Tenno from Yasaka Shrine in Kyoto and held a big religious ceremony to pray for calming down of the epidemic. Then a big bee came from somewhere and stung people one after another. People who were stung were soon cured from the epidemic so that the delighted local people visited Yasaka Shrine carrying Kiriko.

== See also ==
- Gion Matsuri
- Noto, Ishikawa
- List of festivals in Japan
