= Kumagaya Uchiwa Festival =

Kumagaya Uchiwa Festival is a yearly festival that occurs in Saitama Prefecture Kumagaya city. The festival is held for five days from July 19 to 23 annually. This festival is called Uchiwa and (matsuri), because Uchiwa, the traditional Japanese fans, were distributed to people during the festival in the Meiji era.

There is total of 12 dashi; children and adults march through the streets by pulling a long and thick rope attached to dashi. Traffic is controlled during the festival. A 30-centimeter hand gong makes a big sound with musical accompaniment. Each district has dashi and competes for musical accompaniment by putting their dashi next to each other. Kids and adults play ohayashi, Japanese drumming on the mikoshi. They practice playing instruments every summer, about two months ahead of the festival.

Uchiwa Festival is one of the biggest summer events in Kumagaya, along with Sakura Festival and Kumagaya fireworks festival. More than 750,000 people participate in the festival, and it is referred to as the number one festival in Kanto region. The streets are lined on both sides with stand-selling shops, which sell Yakisoba, cotton candy, Japanese candy, shaved ice, crepes, and many other kinds of foods and toys.

== History ==
The festival first began in 1750. Mikoshi was first made in 1830 and around 1902, when merchants started to give uchiwa to customers. Around the same time, the town grew due to development of the silk industry. Each district began to buy dashi to represent their wealth; they compete which district has bigger and good quality dashi. This was the beginning of the Uchiwa festival.

Many prototypes are carried from Edo and Meiji period; on March 30, 2012, the festival was designated as an intangible cultural property by Kumagaya city.
