= Ojima Neputa Festival =

Festival in Japan

Ojima Neputa festival is held on August 14 and 15 every year at Ōta, Gunma, Ojima district, Japan. It is held at Ojima district's shopping street; people gather from neighborhood prefectures. More than 160,000 people participate every year within two days. Neputa Festival is one of the biggest events in Ota city.

The festival started in Aomori Prefecture, Hirosaki city and Old Ojima town concludes a sister city alliance in 1986. It is continuing after Ota city absorbed the Ojima town in 2005. When the festival first began, it was a small festival that only opened at the schoolyard of an elementary school, and inside of Ojima park. However, as the years went by, it became bigger and bigger, and they started to control the traffic and closed 354 national highways. The Chamber of Commerce and Industry play a central role in the festival to improve one's friendship between two cities. This is how the Neputa festival tradition had taken over in Ojima.

People cheer “Yaya-do”, play bass drum, record with musical accompaniment, and people march with a big fan. A highlight of the festival is the Neputa march, the gigantic 7 meters fan march with a formation making big drum sound. There are more than ten neputa fans.

The festival takes place on 14th and 15 August, which is during Obon festival, this is a week where people go back to their hometown. People in Ojima decide to hold the Neputa festival on these two days because they want young people to attend the hometown festival when they come back to one's home.
