= Matsuyama Shiroyama Koen Cherry Blossom Festival =

Festival in Japan

The Matsuyama Shiroyama Koen Cherry Blossom Festival is held every year in early April in Matsuyama, Ehime Prefecture, Japan. The Matsuyama Castle is lit up with paper lanterns at night until 9 PM.

People eat home-cooked meals or take-out food under the cherry blossom tree, combined with drinking sake, talking and singing songs. The official song for the festival is Sakura Sakura, a traditional Japanese folk song. The preparation is that people have to line the Matsuyama castle with lanterns before the festival begins. It usually goes on for 3 days.

== See also ==
- Japanese festivals
