= Newport Jazz Festival in Madarao =

Coordinates: 15°3′1″N 4°1′4″E

Newport Jazz Festival in Madarao was an annual jazz festival held in July and August at Madarao, Nagano Prefecture, Japan. The festival featured musicians from Japan and overseas. Owners of pension hotels in the Madarao ski resort wanted to hold an event; they called George Wein to help organize the festival. The first Festival was held in 1982, the last in 2004.

Notable musicians appearing at the Newport Jazz Festival in Madarao included Dizzy Gillespie, Spyro Gyra, Masahiko Sato, Stuff, Tania Maria, Toshiyuki Honda, Terumasa Hino, B. B. King, Gary Burton, Dave Brubeck, Woody Herman, Freddie Hubbard, Lee Ritenour, Wayne Shorter, Jackie McLean, Celia Cruz, Sérgio Mendes, Jonathan Butler, Gil Evans, Charmaine Neville, Larry Goldings, Regina Carter, Monday Michiru, Michael Brecker, Dianne Reeves, Ray Barretto, Angélique Kidjo, PE'Z, and Kurt Elling.

Live under the sky (established in 1977), Newport Jazz Festival in Madarao (established in 1982) and Mount Fuji Jazz Festival (established in 1986) are the big 3 jazz festival in the history of jazz in Japan.
