= Chuanqi =

- Traditional Chinese: 傳奇
- Simplified Chinese: 传奇
- Literal meaning: transmission [of the] strange
Transcriptions
Standard Mandarin
- Hanyu Pinyin: Chuánqí

Chuanqi ("strange tale", "legend", or "romance", depending on context) may refer to two related but distinct forms of Chinese fiction:

- Chuanqi (short story and novella), a genre of Chinese fiction usually associated with the Tang dynasty (618–907); the stories tend to be short to medium length
- Chuanqi (theatre), a genre of Chinese opera usually associated with the Ming dynasty (1368–1644); the plays tend to be very long
