= Aomori Nebuta Matsuri =

Japanese summer festival

Coordinates: 40°49′20″N 140°44′51″E

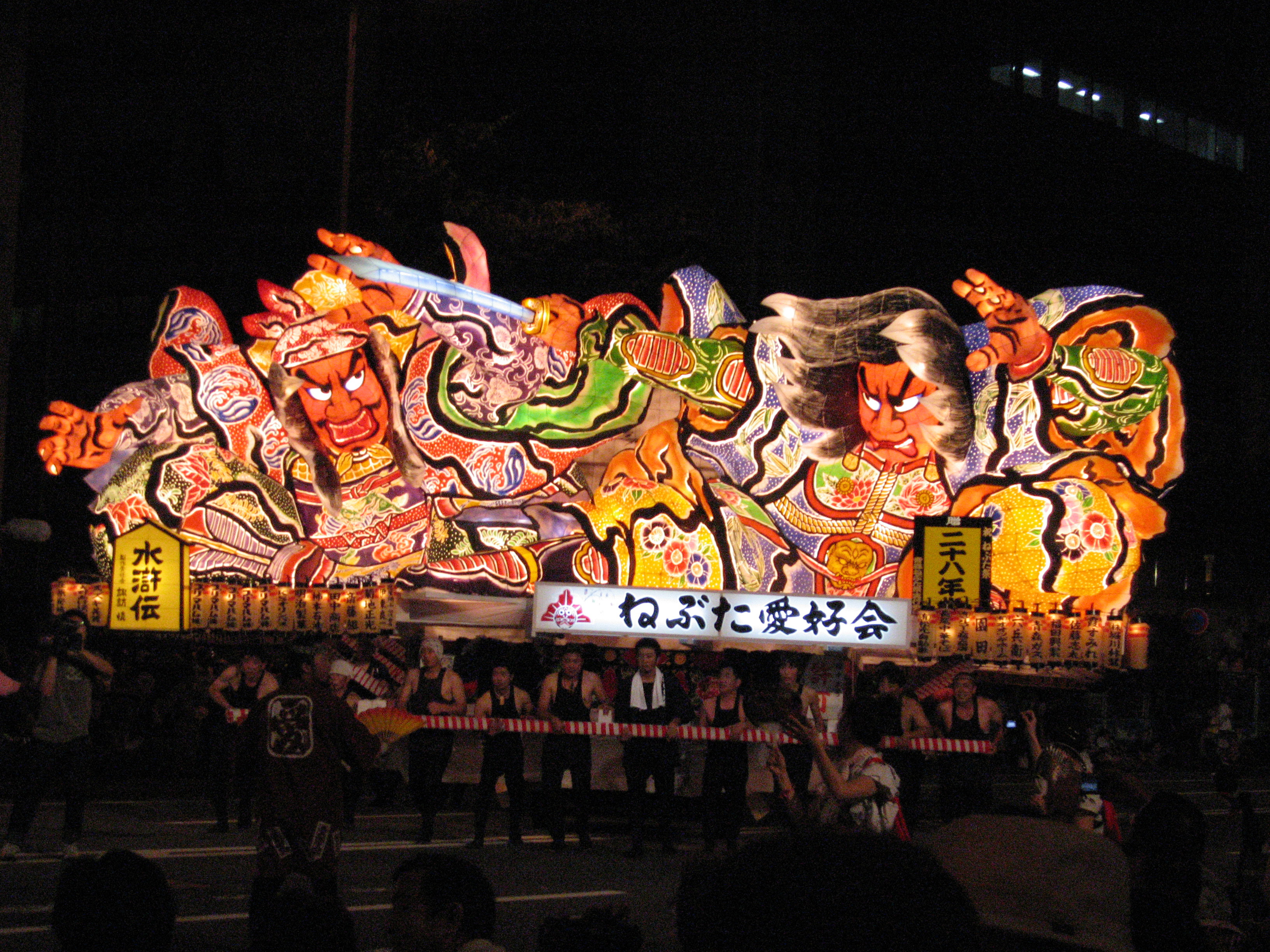
A float being carried at the festival. The floats often depict historical or mythical figures.

The Aomori Nebuta Matsuri (青森ねぶた祭; "Aomori Nebuta Festival" or simply "Aomori Nebuta") is a Japanese summer festival that takes place in Aomori, Aomori Prefecture, Japan in early August. The festival attracts the most tourists of any of the country's nebuta festivals, and is counted among the three largest festivals in the Tōhoku region. It was designated an Important Intangible Folk Cultural Property in 1980, and as one of the 100 Soundscapes of Japan by the Ministry of the Environment in 1996.

"Nebuta" refers to the float of a brave warrior-figure which is carried through the center of the city, while dancers wearing a unique type of costume called haneto (ハネト) dance around in time with the chant Rasserā (ラッセラー) (shortened dialectal version of "irasshai", calling visitors and customers to watch or join). In the local dialect, participation in the festival is inquired using the verb haneru (ハネル; ex. "今日もハネル?" or "Will you haneru today?"), which was derived from the Japanese spelling of the haneto costume and the verb haneru (跳ねる; "bounce").

== Origin and history ==
Video footage of an Aomori Nebuta Matsuri Float with festival music in Nebuta Museum Wa Rasse.

The most widely known explanation is that the festival originated from the flutes and taiko that the future early 9th century shōgun Sakanoue no Tamuramaro used to attract the attention of the enemy during a battle in Mutsu Province. In 1962, the Tamuramaro Shō (Tamuramaro Prize) was created around this explanation to be awarded to the festival's best group participant, an award later renamed the Nebuta Taishō (grand prize). However, it is unlikely that Tamuramaro actually conducted military expeditions in what is currently Aomori Prefecture, so this explanation is considered to be a legend. The festival most likely evolved out of traditional Shinto ceremonies like Tanabata.

Another explanation involves the etymology of the word Nebuta (ねぶた). Aterui (阿弖流為), a general from the Tōhoku region, united the Emishi people who had been chased out of their native territory and defeated Ki no Kosami's army of 50,000 at Kitakami River to advance all the way to Fuji, Shizuoka. This army battled Sakanoue no Tamuramaro's forces for over 12 years, but was ultimately defeated. Aterui was captured and taken to Osaka Prefecture, where he was granted an audience with the ruler before being beheaded. Aterui's severed head was shown off to the public, and his family and followers still remaining in the Tōhoku region were forced to dig large holes where they were buried alive. Dirt was thrown over these graves, and those who surrendered to the Japanese forces and became slaves were instructed to stomp over the dirt. This event is said to be the origin of Nebuta (written "根蓋" in kanji), as Aterui's followers were sent back to their roots or to the world of the dead (根) with the dirt as a covering (蓋). According to this episode, the dancers stomp the ground while carrying the float of Sakanoue No Tamuramaro on their shoulders.

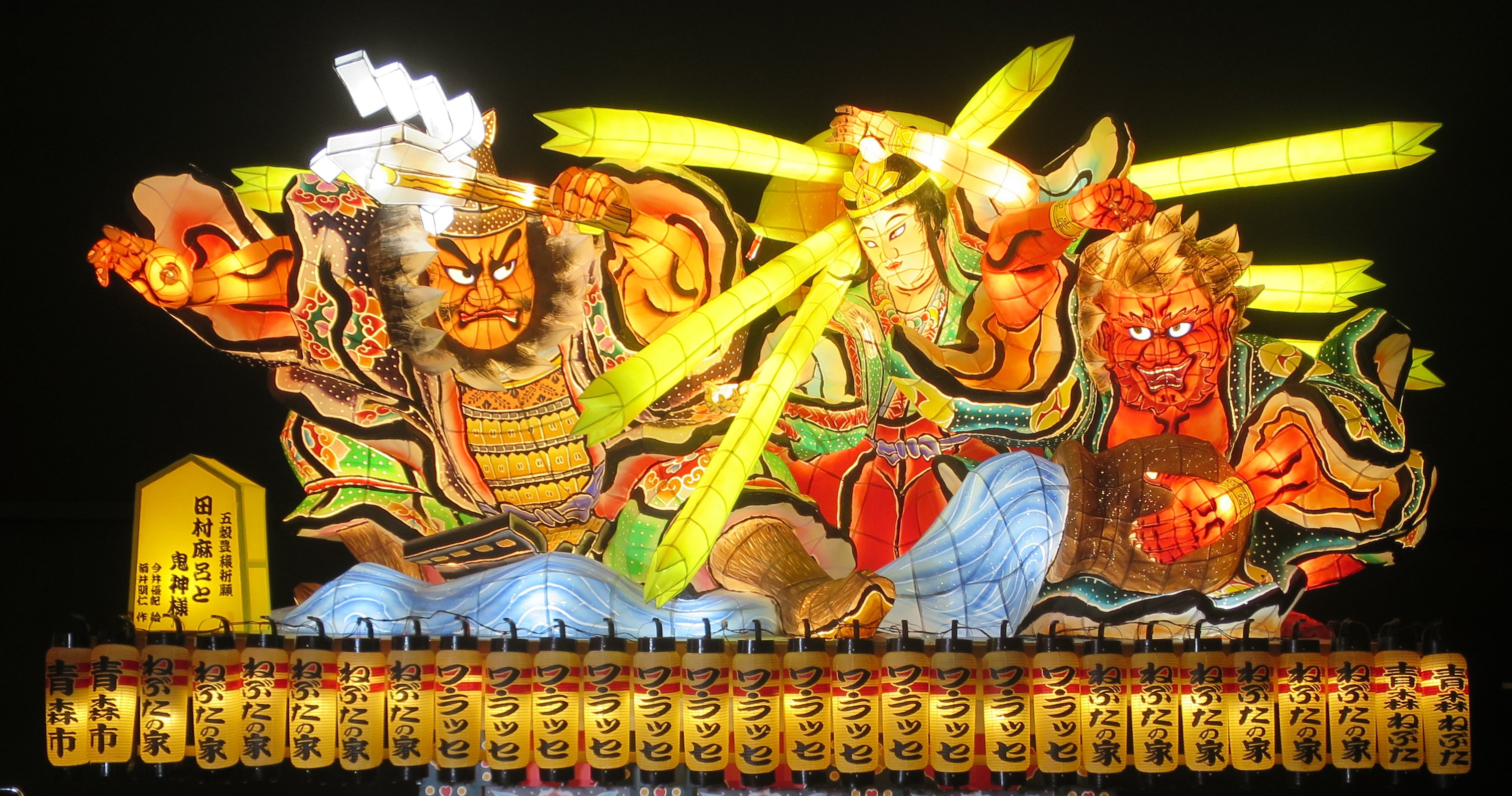
An illuminated nebuta float kept in the Nebuta Museum Wa Rasse in Aomori

During the Edo period and Meiji period, the act of carrying a large lantern float like the Nebuta was often banned by the government due to the potential fire hazard it posed to the surroundings. This ban was also put into place during World War II, but was lifted in 1944 as an effort to boost morale during the waning years of the war. Corporations began to sponsor the creation of the floats in the post-war period, and a strong emphasis was placed in expanding local tourism through the festival. The light source within the float was originally a candle, but was eventually changed to incandescent or fluorescent light bulbs powered by portable generators and rechargeable batteries. The frame of the floats also changed from bamboo to wire, lowering the risk of fire considerably. Nebuta floats also grew larger with time, but urban obstacles such as footbridges, power lines, and traffic lights only allowed their width to increase significantly. The floats often feature images of kabuki actors, various types of gods, and historical or mythical figures from Japanese or Chinese culture, but modern Nebuta floats may also feature famous regional personalities or characters from television shows (especially the annual historical "Taiga drama" aired by NHK).

A museum dedicated to the Nebuta Festival, Nebuta Museum Wa Rasse, opened in 2011, providing an experience of the festival all year round for those who cannot come to the festival in August.

== Organization ==
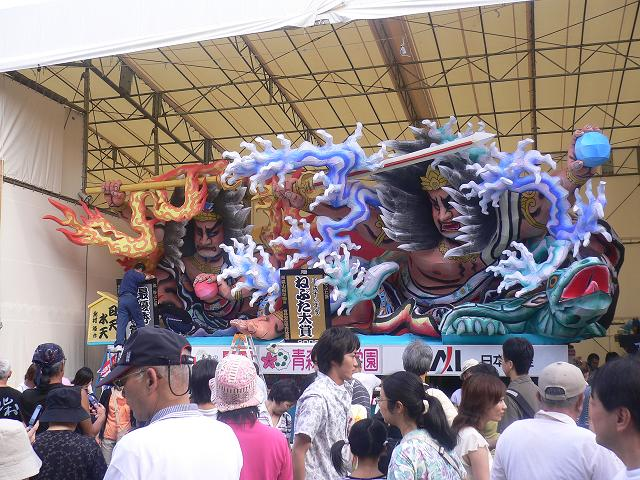
A float on display

The festival is held every year from August 2 to August 7, where the float is carried through the city during the evening from August 2 to August 6, and during the daytime on August 7. A fireworks show is held on the evening of the final day while the float is carried into the sea.

== Processional route ==
The float is carried through the area surrounded by National Route 4, Shinmachi Street, Kenchō Street, and Aomori Heiwa Park. In the past, the floats started off one at a time from the intersection between National Route 4 and Kenchō street, and continued along the course in the clockwise direction. However, this caused the narrow Shinmachi Street to become overcrowded with festival participants, and the floats became unable to progress during the busiest parts of the festival. The route was changed to round the area in a counter-clockwise direction in order to solve this problem. The starting point was shifted to the intersection between Shinmachi Street and Yanagimachi Street when the building housing the floats changed locations.

Despite all of these changes, the finishing point of the route continued to be overcrowded with participants, preventing the festival itself from coming to a close. Two of the main streets in Aomori City are blocked off during the Aomori Nebuta, creating significant inconveniences for citizens if the procession does not finish on time. An increased number of karasu-zoku (see below) added to this problem, as these vandals tended to gather at the tail-end of the procession to cause disruption. Therefore, in 2001, all of the floats were pre-placed around the city and began their procession all at once and ended all at once at the signal of fireworks. The route was also changed back to the clock-wise direction. This caused there to be no beginning or tail-end to the procession, allowing the procession to flow more smoothly. This method also led to a decreased number of karasu-zoku and other vandals. However, the procession is always held in its original format on the final day of the festival.

== Participation ==
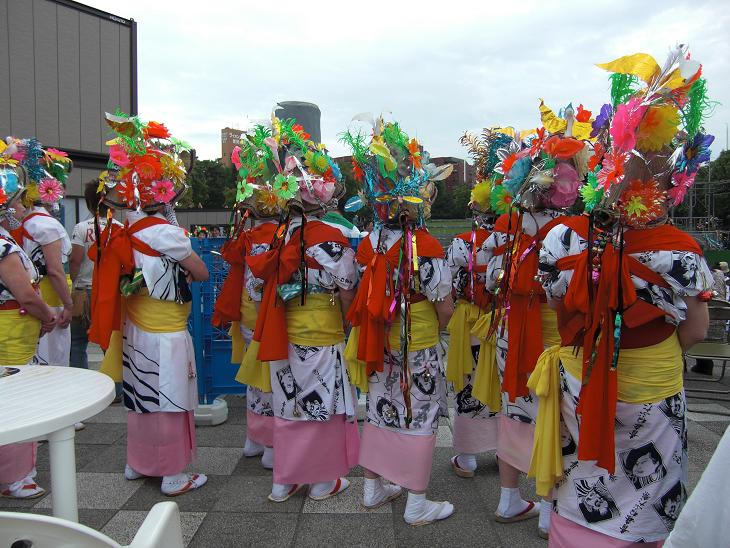
Costume worn by haneto dancers at the festival with unique headdress and bells

Each processional group individually organizes the basic elements of the nebuta, such as processional order, creation of floats, and marching-band musicians. Other important factors include the children who pull the floats with ropes (in most cases, the floats are carried along by other means, and the children are just there for show), and the haneto dancers. Anyone, including tourists, can participate in any of the processions as a haneto as long as they are wearing the proper costume. The costumes are sold in supermarkets and department stores all across the prefecture, and a full set (excluding the flower hat) can be purchased for around 5000 yen. Costumes can also be rented at some places along the processional route.

The best processional group is awarded the Heisei (heisei year) where the year number is placed after "Heisei". This award was first created as the Tamuramaro Award in 1962, but was changed to its current name in 1995 because people thought it odd to have Sakanoue no Tamuramaro's name in the award (Tamuramaro is perceived as a ruthless conqueror by the Tōhoku people).

In 2001, an incident involving 4,000 members of the Japanese Karasu-zoku (カラス族; lit. "crow tribe") subculture launching fireworks, led to a number of attendees leaving the festival. Because of this, there was increased police surveillance in the following years.

== Nebuta in other cities ==
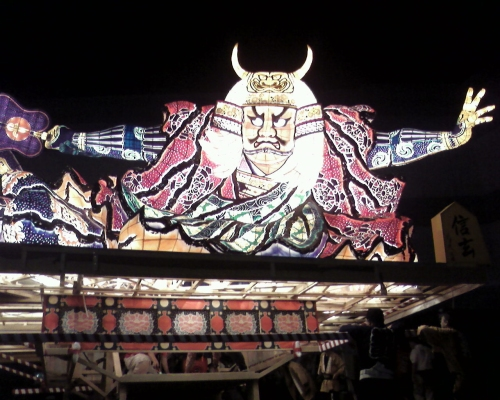
LA Nebuta, the final float at the 2007 Nisei Week parade

The floats from the Aomori Nebuta were taken to the Hakodate Ika Odori festival in 2007. This was done as part of a friendship agreement between the two cities, and the Ika Odori led the float procession on the final day of the festival during the previous year's festival (August 7, 2006). The floats have also been invited every year to Shibuya, Tokyo, where the festival has taken place annually in September since 2005.

Other nebuta festivals take place in over 30 other villages and cities across Aomori Prefecture. The largest of these are the festivals in Hirosaki, Goshogawara, Kuroishi, and Mutsu. There are also many instances across Japan where the nebuta floats are included as part of a larger festival. The nebuta also made its way to Seoul, South Korea for the first time in September, 2005, and to the United States in August, 2007, 2009 and 2010, as part of Nisei Week in Little Tokyo, Los Angeles, California.

== See also ==
- List of festivals in Aomori Prefecture
- 100 Soundscapes of Japan
