= Sakai Matsuri =

Annual event in Sakai, Osaka, Japan

Sakai Matsuri (堺まつり) or Sakai Festival, is one of the three largest annual events in Sakai City, along with the Sakai Citizen’s Olympics, and the Sakai City Agricultural Festival.

The Sakai Matsuri has been held annually on the third weekend in October, every year since 1974, along the Oshoji Symbol Road, in Sakai-ku. The Sakai Matsuri is mainly organised by the Sakai Tourism and Convention Bureau.

== History ==
The first Sakai Matsuri was held in 1974 as an alternative event to the Sakai Grand Evening Fish Market, and has been held every year since.

== Outline ==
The festival's main events are the Pre-parade Party, Grand Parade, Grand Tea Ceremony, and Namban Markets, and are held in the Civic Square in front of the Sakai City Office and the area around the Sakai Ginza Shopping Arcade.

=== Pre-Parade Party ===
A Pre-Parade opening event is held on the Saturday before the parade in the Sakai Civic Hall. The Pre-parade Party features local performers, entertainers and manzai comedians, as well as a Futon-daiko performance outside.

=== Namban Markets ===
Held in Xavier Park, the Namban Markets recreate the culture of Sakai's prosperous merchants in the Middle Ages. The markets feature local products for sale, including Sakai knives, wagashi, incense, kombu, and textiles, as well as booths offering world foods and various promotional stands and stage events. Stage performances include music concerts, dances and marching band performances by locals.

=== Grand Parade ===
Starting at 11:00 am on Sunday, in front of Kumano Elementary School, and held along the one-kilometre (0.62 mi) stretch of Oshoji St until Ichi Elementary School, the 7000-strong Grand Parade transforms the street into a pedestrian paradise with folk costumes from around the world, folk dances, bicycle/unicycle performances, matchlock gun salutes, and all kinds of groups and performers, closing at around 5:00 pm with 10 Futondaiko.

=== Grand Tea Ceremony ===
Held simultaneously in Daisen Park and at Nanshu-ji Temple.

==== Daisen Park Ceremony ====
An Open-air tea ceremony hosted by university and kindergarten students, together with the sencha association. There are also koto and shakuhachi performances as well as Japanese confectionery for sale.

==== Nanshu-ji Temple Ceremony ====
Seated and Open-air tea ceremonies of the San-senke styles (three schools of tea ceremony that descend from Sen-no-Rikyu’s style.
