= Sichuan River =

River in China

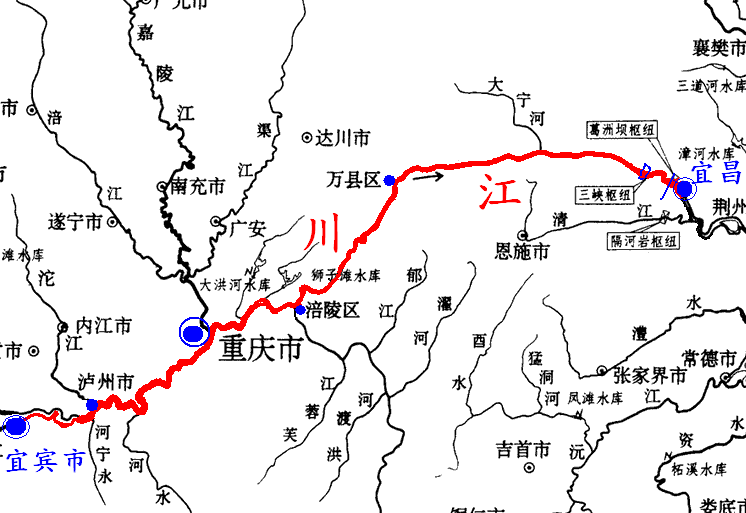
Sichuan River

The Sichuan River or Chuan Jiang (Chinese: 川江; Sichuanese Pinyin: Cuan^{1}jiang^{1}; pinyin: Chuānjiāng), is the upper portion of Yangtze River from Yibin to Yichang. It is named because the river flows through Sichuan and Chongqing, which was part of Sichuan, in this stretch. The total length of Sichuan River is 1,040km. Major cities along Sichuan River include Yibin, Luzhou, Chongqing, Fuling, Wanzhou and Yichang.
