= Umadashi Matsuri =

Umadashi Matsuri (Horse Carriage Festival) is an event typically held during Japanese Fall festivals. A dashi is a carriage in which the spirit of a god rides in ritual procession. In Umadashi Matsuri, the horse (uma) substitutes the carriage. Young people grab onto the reins of horses and run through the sand with them.
