= Chon Wolson =

Korean Japanese opera singer (born 1958)

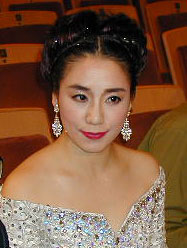
- Chon in 2000
- Born: 1958 (age 67–68); Tachikawa, Tokyo, Japan

Korean name
- Hangul: 전월선
- Hanja: 田月仙
- RR: Jeon Wolseon
- MR: Chŏn Wŏlsŏn

Japanese name
- Kanji: 田 月仙
- Katakana: チョン・ウォルソン
- Romanization: Chon Woruson

Chon Wolson (born 1958) is a Korean soprano opera singer with the Tokyo-based Nikikai Opera Company. Born in Tokyo, she is a second-generation Zainichi-Korean.

== Career ==
In 1985, Chon Wolson sang the leading part in two operas - Poulenc's La voix humaine and Ravel's L'heure espagnole . She later went on to sing leading parts in The Marriage of Figaro (Mozart), The Turn of the Screw (Britten), Pagliacci (Leoncavallo), Madama Butterfly (Puccini), Salome (Richard Strauss), Carmen (Bizet), and La traviata (Verdi).

In 1985, she gave a solo vocal performance in Pyongyang, North Korea. In 1994, she performed the title role in Carmen (director: Flavio Trevisan) in the Seoul Opera House, South Korea.

She became the first singer in decades to sing songs in Japanese during an event commemorating the Tokyo-Seoul Sister City 10th Anniversary in the South Korean capital, where Japanese songs were prohibited.

In 2002, Japan and South Korea co-hosted the 2002 FIFA World Cup, and Chon appeared in such events as the "Japan-Korea Friendship Concert" (Suntory Hall, Tokyo); the Japan and Korea gala concert "Crossing the Sea" (Tokyo Opera City), Japan-South Korean joint opera Chun Hyangjeon, singing the national anthem before the match and at the welcome of South Korean President Kim Dae-jung organized by Prime Minister Junichiro Koizumi at the Prime Minister's Official Residence.

In 2004, marking the 20th anniversary of her debut, a special 90-minute-long program titled "The diva who crossed the strait – 20 years of the Korean singer in Japan", featuring Chon's career, was broadcast on the Japanese national broadcasting station NHK. "The diva who crossed the strait" won the 13th Shogakukan (Japan) non-fiction grand prize in 2006.

Chon sings Love of Country, which is an appeal for peace between the North and South. Documentary programs created about these concerts were broadcast on the South Korean national TV KBS on "Sunday Special" as well as in Japan. In 1996, Chon sang Love of Country on South Korea's New Year's Eve program, marking the first time the program featured a live performance. Later, she gave recitals in several South Korean cities.

== Personal life ==
Chon was born in 1958 in Tachikawa, Tokyo, Japan. She graduated from the Toho Gakuen School of Music.

Chon's four brothers were participants in the 1959–1984 repatriation program sponsored by Chongryon in the late 1960s, and fell victim to purges of Zainichi Koreans by Kim Il Sung. Her second brother died in a concentration camp in 1970; the other three were released in 1978. The three surviving brothers met Chon during the 1985 Pyongyang performance, but as a result of the stress placed on them during the meeting, she refused further performances in North Korea. After her mother died in 2005 she published a book in December 2006 titled "Kaikyo no Aria" ("Aria over the Strait)", her memoirs.
