= Four rivers =

Four rivers may refer to:

== Places ==
- The four rivers in the Old Testament Garden of Eden (Pishon, Gihon, Tigris, and Euphrates)
- The four rivers that water the world in Hindu scripture (Ganges, Indus, Oxus, and Śita)
- Four Rivers Bay, Nunavut, Canada
- Sichuan province, China

== Other uses ==
- Four Rivers Transportation, an American railroad holding company based in Wilmington, Delaware
- Four Rivers Community School, Ontario, Oregon, USA
- Four Rivers Conference (Illinois), USA; a highschool sports conference
- Fountain of the Four Rivers, a 17th-century fountain in Rome designed by Gian Lorenzo Bernini (Danube, Nile, Ganges, La Plata)

== See also ==
- Fourth River, a 2020 film
- Battle of the Four Rivers (1914), a WW1 battle in Poland between Germany and Russia
- Battle on the Four Rivers (1522), between Sdach Korn and Chan Reachea in Cambodia
- Four Major Rivers Project, multi-purpose green growth project in South Korea
- Sichuan (disambiguation) (Mandarin Chinese: 四川, lit. '4 Rivers')
- Shisen (disambiguation) (Japanese: 四川, lit. '4 Rivers')
