= Mount Fuji Jazz Festival =

Music festival in Japan (1986–2004)

Mount Fuji Jazz Festival マウント・フジ・ジャズ・フェスティバル
- Genre: Jazz
- Date: August
- Locations: Lake Yamanaka, Yamanashi Prefecture, Japan
- Coordinates: 35°25′09″N 138°54′05″E
- Years active: 1986–2004

The Mount Fuji Jazz Festival was an annual jazz festival held in August on the shores of Lake Yamanaka, Yamanashi Prefecture, Japan, from 1986 to 2004. The three-day festival featured musicians from Blue Note Records and others, performing on various stages. Blue Note executive Alfred Lion came to this festival for the first time in 1986.

Notable artists who have performed at the Mount Fuji Jazz Festival include Andrew Hill, Herbie Hancock, Gonzalo Rubalcaba, Ron Carter, James Newton, Albert Collins, Jimmy Smith, Bobby Hutcherson, Michael Brecker, Jackie McLean, The Jazz Messengers, George Kawaguchi, McCoy Tyner, Stanley Jordan, Dianne Reeves, Tony Williams, Chaka Khan, Don Pullen, Sadao Watanabe, Chick Corea, Wynton Marsalis, Terumasa Hino, Bob Belden, John Scofield, Lee Ritenour, Hiromi Uehara, Junko Onishi, Us3, Joe Henderson, Shuichi Murakami, and Pat Metheny.

Live Under the Sky (established in 1977), Newport Jazz Festival in Madarao (established in 1982), and Mount Fuji Jazz Festival (established in 1986) are the big three jazz festivals in the history of jazz in Japan.

== Recordings ==
- Chick Corea, Mt. Fuji Jazz Festival 1991 (So What! [24 August 1991]) – with Gonzalo Rubalcaba
- Johnny Griffin, Mt. Fuji Jazz Festival '88 (Jazztime [27 August 1988]) – with Robin Eubanks, Roy Hargrove, Bobby Watson, Renee Rosnes, Marlene Rosenberg, and Cindy Blackman
- Herbie Hancock Trio, At Mt. Fuji Jazz Festival 1986-89 (After-Hours Products, 2021) – with Ron Carter, Tony Williams, Bobby Hutcherson, Freddie Hubbard, Joe Henderson, Wallace Roney, and James Newton
- Herbie Hancock Acoustic Trio, Mt. Fuji Jazz Festival 1995 (So What! [27 August 1995]) – with Dave Holland, Gene Jackson
- Al McKay Allstars, Live At Mt. Fuji Jazzfestival 2002 (VideoArts Music, 2003)
- Out of the Blue, Live At Mt. Fuji (Blue Note, 1987 [31 August 1986]) – Kenny Garrett, Ralph Bowen, Michael Philip Mossman, Harry Pickens, Kenny Davis, and Ralph Peterson
- Michel Petrucciani, Live In Japan and More (So What! [1988]) – with Flavio Boltro, Denis Leloup, Stefano Di Battista, Gary Peacock, Miroslav Vitous, Palle Danielsson, Eliot Zigmund, Roy Haynes, Steve Gadd
- Dianne Reeves, That's All (TOEMI, 1987 [29 August 1987])
- Gonzalo Rubalcaba, Images (Live At Mt. Fuji) (Blue Note, 1991 [24 & 25 August 1991) – with John Patitucci and Jack DeJohnette
- Steps Ahead, Mt. Fuji Jazz Festival 2004 (So What!, 2021 [29 August 2004]) – Michael Brecker, Mike Stern, Mike Mainieri, Adam Holzman, Darryl Jones, and Steve Gadd
- Cedar Walton Trio, Mt. Fuji Jazz Festival With Blue Note 1986 (Jazztime [30 August 1986]) – with Jackie McLean and Woody Shaw

== Gallery ==
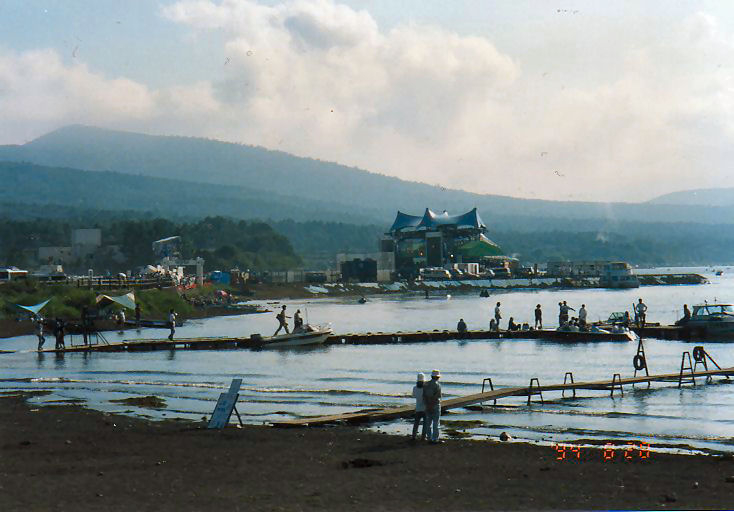
Mount Fuji Jazz Festival, 28 August 1994

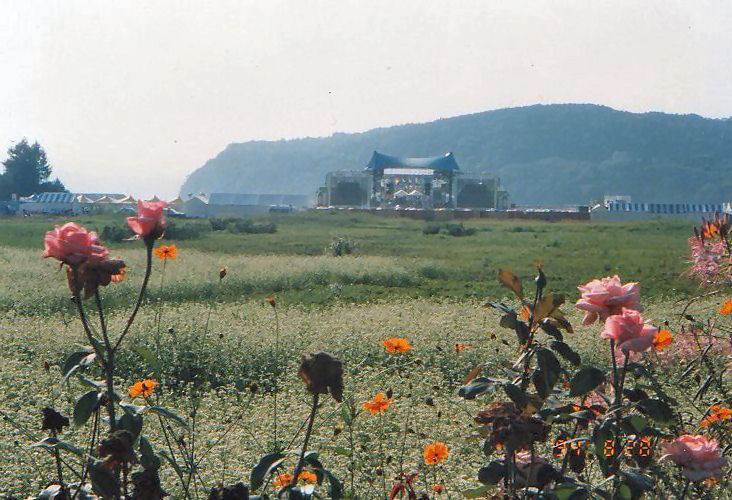
Mount Fuji Jazz Festival, 28 August 1994
