= Shisen-Sho =

Japanese tile-based game similar to Solitare

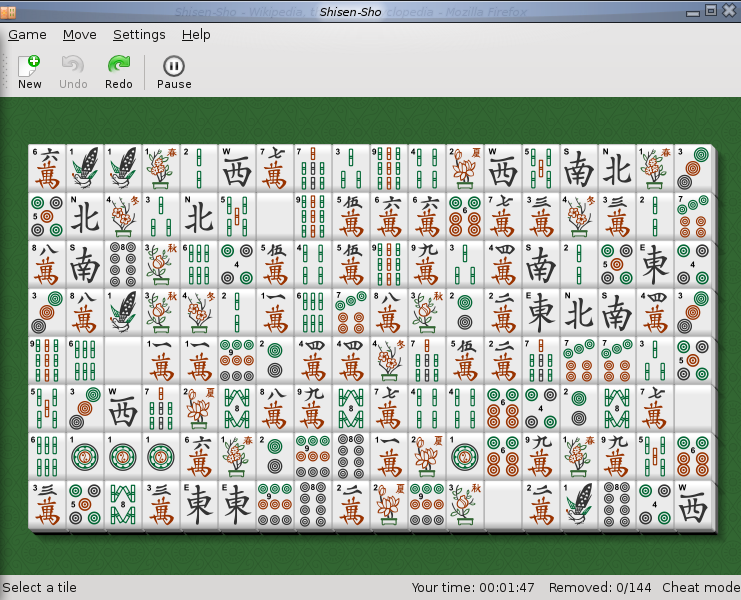
Shisen-Sho computer game, running on KDE 4.0.5

Shisen-Sho (四川省, Shisenshō; "Sichuan Province"), sometimes referred to as 'Shisen', 'Four Rivers' or simply 'Rivers,' is a Japanese tile-based game which uses Mahjong tiles, and is similar to Mahjong solitaire. The objective of the game is to match similar tiles in pairs until every tile has been removed from the playing field. Numerous computer based versions of the game have been developed.

== Rules ==
Player choose a pair of identical tiles to connect, and the connection path must consist of horizontal/vertical line segments, unobstructed by tiles, and must not exceed two turns. If the requirements are met, two tiles will be eliminated. The player's task is to eliminate all the tiles on the board. The game is over if future moves are not possible and tiles are left on the board, or the player successfully removes all the tiles.

Since there is only one of each flower and season mahjong tiles, flowers are normally matched with each other, and seasons are normally matched with each other. Alternatively, when playing digitally, some implementations include extra copies of flower and season tiles so that identical duplicates can be matched.

== List of Shishen-Sho video games ==
List of Shishen-Sho of video games
Name	Year	Manufacturer	Platform(s)	Adult
Dragon Punch (JP) / Sports Match (NA)	1989	Dynax Inc.	Arcade	Yes (Japanese version only)
Turn It	1989	Kingsoft	Amiga OCS, Atari ST	No
Shisen-Sho: Joshiryo-hen (JP) / Match It (NA)	1989	Irem Corp.	Arcade	Yes (Japanese version only)
Lin Wu's Challenge	1990	SolarSoft / LaserSoft	Amiga OCS, Atari ST	No
Lin Wu's Challenge	1991	SolarSoft / LaserSoft	MS-DOS	No
Shisen-Sho - Match-Mania	1990	Irem Corp.	Game Boy	No
Turn It II	1989	Tale Software	Amiga OCS, C64	No
Happy Pairs	1991	Sachen	NES	No
Shisen-Sho II/Match It II	1993	Irem Corp.	Arcade	Yes
Casanova	1994	Promat	Arcade	Yes
Shisen-Sho 2000	1997	T-TIME TECHNOLOGIES	Windows	No
One + Two	1997	Barko	Arcade	Yes
KAWAI連連看2	2002	CHEN PROGRAM STUDY	Windows	No
KAWAI連連看2003	2003	CHEN PROGRAM STUDY	Windows	No
KAWAI連連看2004	2004	CHEN PROGRAM STUDY	Windows	No
KAWAI連連看2005	2005	CHEN PROGRAM STUDY	Windows	No
Shisen Sho Mahjong Connect	2018	mobirix	Android, iOS	No
Shisensho Solitaire	2019	Nick Ramsay	Windows	No
Shisen-Sho Nikakudori	2020	Red Flagship Co., Ltd.	Nintendo Switch	No
Pretty Girls Rivers	2021	Zoo Corporation	Windows	Yes
Shisen-Sho	2023	Genesis Project	C64	No

== Images ==
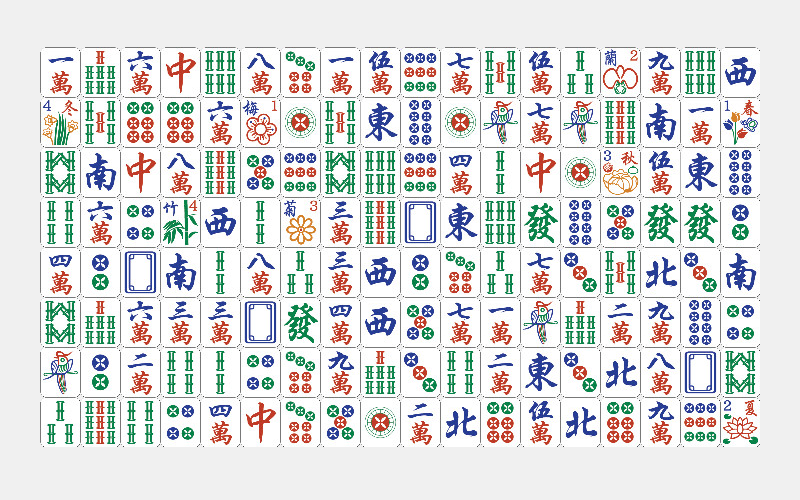
Shisen-Sho starting board

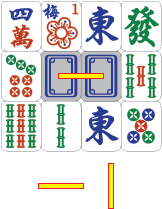
Connected by one line segment, no turns

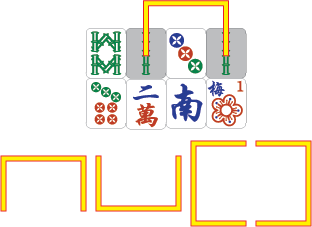
Connected by three line segments, same-direction turns

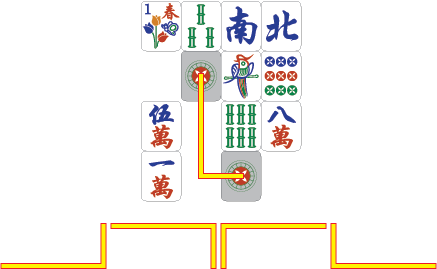
Connected by two line segments, one turn

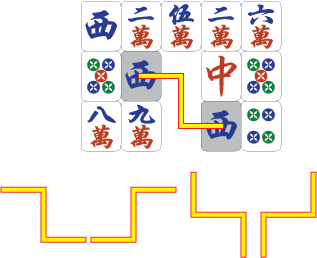
Connected by three line segments, opposite-direction turns

== See also ==
- Mahjong tiles
- Mahjong solitaire
- Mahjong
