= Heart-Aid Shisen =

Heart-Aid Shisen (Japanese: ハートエイド・四川, Chinese: 心系四川) was a major fund raising concert held on July 14, 2008 in Tokyo, Japan for the victims of the 2008 Sichuan earthquake. Featuring artists from across East Asia (most of whom were well known in Japan), the concert was organized by Jackie Chan and Judy Ongg. The event helped raise over 27 million Japanese Yen.

== Participants ==
- Mainland China
  - alan
  - Yao Xinfeng, Zhao Lei, Yu Bin, Tang Xiaofeng, Qian Jun and Liu Yi from "Togi + Bao"
- Hong Kong
  - Jackie Chan
  - Sandy Lam
  - Aaron Kwok
  - Ekin Cheng
- Taiwan
  - Judy Ongg
- Japan
  - w-inds. (Ryohei Chiba, Keita Tachibana, Ryuichi Ogata)
  - Kosetsu Minami
  - Kousuke Atari
  - JAYWALK (Kouichi Nakamura, Masateru Asakawa, Hiroshi Sugita)
  - Iruka (Toshie Kamibe)
  - Terumasa Hino
  - Hideki Togi from "Togi + Bao"
  - Akina Nakamori
- South Korea
  - John Hoon
  - JULY (Jang Joon-Woo)
