= List of The Tale of Genji characters =

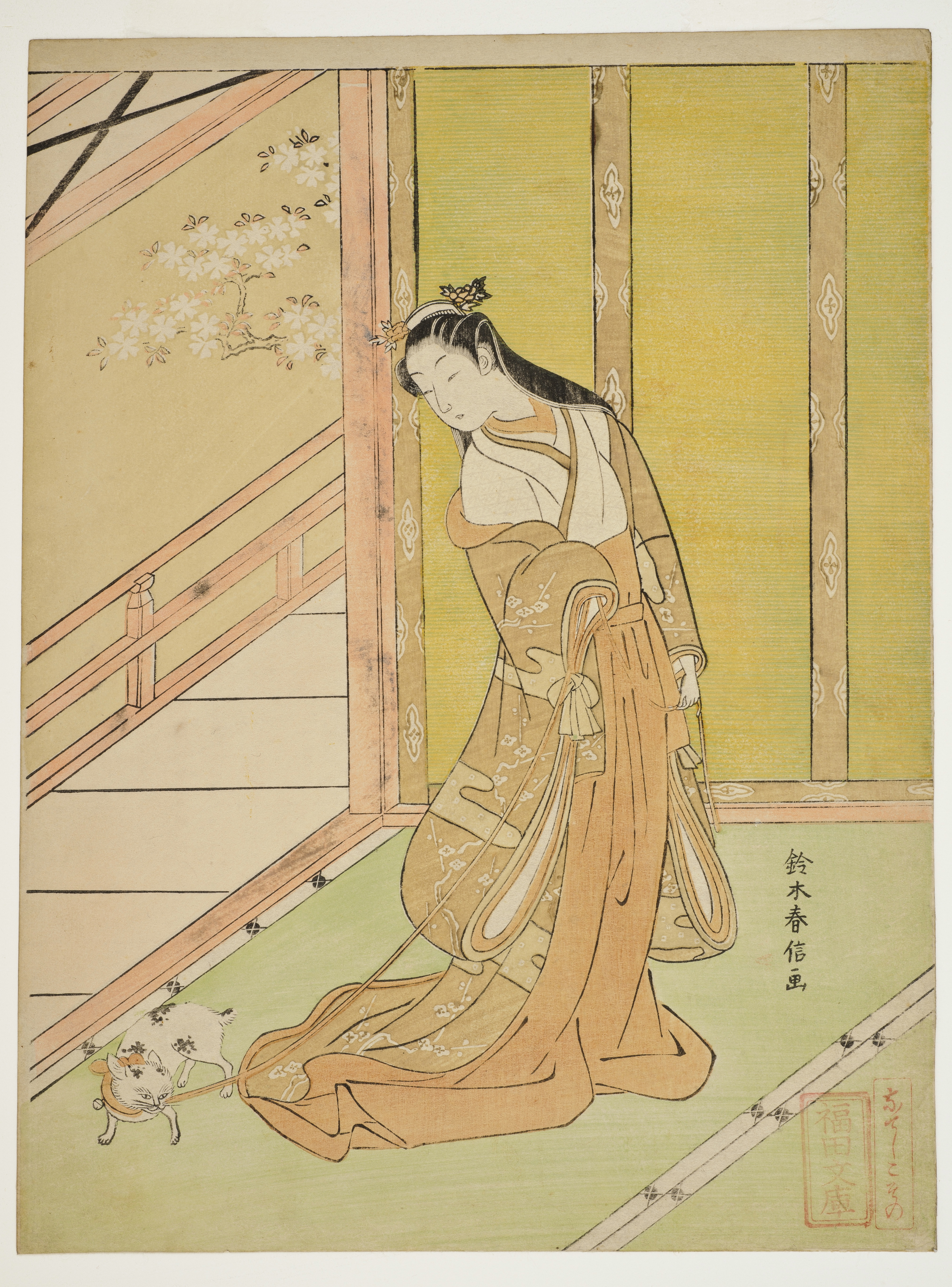
The Third Princess, a character from The Tale of Genji (ukiyo-e by Suzuki Harunobu, ca. 1766)

The characters of The Tale of Genji do not possess birth names. Instead they are assigned sobriquets derived from poetic exchanges (e.g. Murasaki takes her name from a poem by Genji), from the particular court positions they occupy (in the Tyler translation, characters are often referred to by such terms as His Highness of War, Her Majesty the Empress, His Grace, the Palace Minister and so on), from their geographical location (e.g. Lady Akashi who lived on the Akashi coast before meeting Genji), or from the name of their residence (e.g. Lady Rokujō, whose mansion is on the Sixth Avenue, rokujō, or Fujitsubo, literally wisteria pavilion, the part of the Imperial Palace where this particular lady resided). In two out of the three complete translations into English, Seidensticker’s tends to systematically employ the same names (e.g. Genji, Murasaki, Akashi, Utsusemi, etc.), whereas Tyler’s, a more textually accurate translation, tends to change sometimes characters’ appellation with every chapter.

Similarly, many women writers of the Heian period left behind their sobriquets alone. Murasaki Shikibu is no exception: "Murasaki" means "purple" and is likely derived from her character of the same name or her clan background, which used the wisteria as its flower, while “Shikibu” refers to a court position in the Bureau of Ceremonies (shikibu) that her father used to occupy.

== Notes ==
Following Genji, all the other characters are introduced following the chronology of the events in the tale. However, this chronology does not take into account the first time a character is mentioned, but rather the time a character actually makes his or her debut into the tale. Some of the character descriptions below include a reference to the chapter in which the character is introduced to the narrative. Important characters are in capital letters.

== Characters ==
=== Part I ===
- Prince Genji (Hikaru Genji/ the Shining Genji/ the Shining Prince) – The eponymous hero of the tale, he is the son of an emperor (usually referred to as Kiritsubo Emperor) and of a low-ranking imperial concubine (known to readers as Lady Kiritsubo or Kiritsubo Kōi). Many scholars have tried to decipher the real or fictional model behind the character of Genji. Some of the favorite candidates are Ariwara no Narihira (the hero of The Tales of Ise), Emperor Murakami, Sugawara no Michizane, Minamoto no Tōru or Fujiwara no Korechika. Independently of Murasaki Shikibu's sources of inspiration, Hikaru Genji cannot be simply reduced to being a mere fictional reflection of a real historical figure. In the tale, Genji occupies center stage from chapters one to forty-one and the narrative focuses on his amorous exploits and political successes. Although demoted to commoner status (and forced to take the name of Minamoto), Genji rises in rank to the position of Honorary Retired Emperor and lives to see his children becoming Emperor, Empress and Minister, respectively. In the realm of amorous relationships, the narrative follows Genji from his adventurous youth, a time in which he engages in multiple relationships with women of various ranks, to his mature years, when his political and erotic success is best reflected in his Rokujō-in mansion, a residence built to shelter the most important women in his life and to mirror the Imperial Palace (or at least its hidden quarters reserved to the emperor's female staff). The peak of Genji's glory, however, also announces his slow but inexorable decline, and chapters such as “Nowaki” and “Wakana” reveal his vulnerability in front of a new generation of young heroes, Yūgiri and Kashiwagi. The disintegration of Genji's world becomes final with the death of his beloved Murasaki, in chapter forty, “Minori,” and he dies shortly afterward.
- Lady Kiritsubo (the Kiritsubo Intimate/ Kiritsubo Kōi/ Kiritsubo Consort) – Genji's mother and the favorite of Emperor Kiritsubo, Lady Kiritsubo is disadvantaged at court because she lacks parental support. Her father, a Grand Counselor, is already dead at the beginning of the narrative, and her mother cannot provide her with political support. Thus, the lady provokes the jealousy of other imperial concubines, in particular that of the Kokiden Consort, a lady with well-founded hopes of becoming Empress. As a result, Kiritsubo is constantly harassed by the other women and the humiliations she has to suffer at court eventually trigger her premature death, only three years after having given birth to Genji. Her name is derived from the Paulownia Pavilion, where she resided while at the Imperial Court, the farthest location from the emperor's chambers and symbolic of the lady's low status (at least when compared to other imperial concubines). (chapter 1). The character of Kiritsubo is loosely based on the historical Yang Guifei.
- Emperor Kiritsubo (Kiritsubo no Mikado) – Genji's father, who despite the large social gap between him and the Kiritsubo Lady, maintains an unwavering devotion to her, tragically exposing her to the jealousy of his other consorts. Aware of Genji's fate were he to attract the hostility of the Kokiden Lady, and also worried about the predictions made by a Korean soothsayer concerning Genji's potential future (as an emperor, Genji would bring about unrest; as a minister, he would also face foreboding uncertainty), the Emperor demotes Genji from imperial prince to commoner. Thus, at least in theory, Genji is forbidden to ascend to the throne. Instead, Kiritsubo Emperor names Suzaku, Genji's half-brother and the son of the ambitious Kokiden Lady as Heir Apparent (or Crown Prince). Furthermore, the emperor also arranges Genji's marriage to Aoi, the daughter of the Minister of the Left and, by this, ensures that his son will benefit from the powerful political support of his father-in-law, the only one able to balance the influence of Kokiden and her party. Sometime after the death of his beloved Kiritsubo, the emperor learns of the existence of an imperial princess, referred to as Fujitsubo (again, after the name of her residence, the Wisteria Pavilion), who uncannily resembles his lost love. Of an incomparable higher status than her unfortunate predecessor, Fujitsubo goes on to become the emperor's favorite and ultimately Empress, but her resemblance to Genji's mother also attracts Genji's initially childish interest in her. This childish interest, once turned erotic, fuels much of the later narrative plot.(chapter 1; dies chapter 10)
- Suzaku (later, Emperor Suzaku/ Suzaku (Tale of Genji)) – The son of Kiritsubo Emperor by the Kokiden Lady, Genji's half-brother and grandson of the powerful Minister of the Right, he is named Heir Apparent, although the Kiritsubo Emperor would have personally preferred to make Genji a Crown Prince. Apparently a pathetic figure throughout the narrative (he is cuckolded by Genji, sees the women he would like to have taken away from him, becomes a puppet in the hands of his mother and her political faction), Suzaku still retains a tragic dignity, especially during the “Wakana” chapters, when, after having abdicated and taken Buddhist vows, his religious devotion is obstructed by his excessive paternal love for his favorite daughter, the Third Princess (Onna San No Miya/ Nyōsan). Moreover, at least one Genji critic distinguishes Suzaku's vengeful potential, by identifying him with the possessing spirit affecting the women of the Uji chapters.(chapter 1; like Genji's death, Suzaku's death is not featured in the narrative)
- Lady Kokiden (Kokiden Consort) – Kiritsubo Emperor's consort of higher rank (nyōgo) than Lady Kiritsubo (kōi), she is the daughter of the powerful Minister of the Right. Bitterly jealous of the emperor's love for Kiritsubo, once her rival is dead, her animosity comes to affect her rival's son, Genji. Thus, due to political scheming, she finally has her son, Suzaku, appointed Heir Apparent. Nevertheless, once Fujitsubo debuts into the narrative, Kokiden is confronted with a much more powerful rival, one that is more high-ranking than Kiritsubo and thus can claim the title of Empress, leaving Kokiden to content herself with being “only” the Empress Mother. Time and again, Kokiden figures in the narrative as Genji's archrival, plotting and scheming to eliminate him from court and finally succeeding in stripping him of his rank and sending him into exile at Suma. Genji's return from exile marks the beginning of his political ascension and also his victory over the Kokiden Lady.(chapter 1–14)
- Lady Fujitsubo (Her Highness/ Majesty Fujitsubo) – Daughter of a previous emperor and thus imperial princess, Fujitsubo enters the service of Emperor Kiritsubo at the age of sixteen, mainly because of her resemblance to the deceased Lady Kiritsubo. She soon becomes an imperial favorite, but also Genji's childhood crush and later lifelong obsession. By chapter seven, “Momiji no ha,” it becomes obvious that Fujitsubo and Genji are already involved in an illicit love affair (although the author does not describe, but rather implies the beginning of the relationship), the result of which is the birth of Reizei (future emperor) whom everyone, except the two lovers, believes to be the son of the Kiritsubo Emperor. Elevated to the rank of Empress and having her son named Heir Apparent (Reizei is supposed to succeed Suzaku), Fujitsubo gradually grows more and more troubled by guilt and the fear of having her secret exposed. Once Genji's advances intensify and, in the public realm, the faction of the Kokiden Lady comes to power, Fujitsubo's only countermeasure is to take vows and become a nun (“Sakaki”). By this, she hopes on the one hand, to permanently put Genji off and eliminate the risk of their affair being discovered and, on the other hand, to reassure Kokiden that she renounces any secular, political claims to power. After Genji's return from exile, she forms a political alliance with him and turns into a genuine “politically ambitious” figure in the tale. Only on her deathbed (in “Usugumo”) does she return to being a romantic heroine. Nevertheless, Fujitsubo's importance in the tale lies beyond her immediate contribution to the plot, in what Norma Field termed as being an “original substitute” (she makes her debut as a substitute for Kiritsubo, yet, later, Genji will look for substitutes for her, in women such as Utsusemi, the Third Princess, but most of all, in Murasaki). (chapter 1; chapter 10 becomes a nun; chapter 19 dies)
- Ōmyōbu(Fujitsubo's Ōmyōbu) – She is a lady-in-waiting in Fujitsubo's service and Genji's accomplice. Her major narrative role is to facilitate Genji's access to Fujitsubo, an event which will have as its result the birth of the future emperor Reizei. In addition, she acts as a go-between in their epistolary exchanges. In the end of her appearances, she is a nun who has taken vows with Fujitsubo. (chapters 5–12)
- Minister of the Left (Sadaijin) – Genji's father-in-law, father to Aoi and Tō no Chūjō, his role is to maintain perfect political balance at the Emperor Kiritsubo's court by countering the influence exerted by the Minister of the Right. He is entrusted with Genji's fate and becomes his protector during Genji's younger years. With the death of the Kiritsubo Emperor however, the Minister falls out of favor and eventually retires from public activities altogether. His main wife is Princess Ōmiya, the mother of Aoi and Tō no Chūjō.(chapter 1-chapter 19)
- Minister of the Right (Udaijin) – Kokiden Lady's father and thus Kiritsubo emperor's father-in-law, the Minister of the Right plays a role similar to the historical position of the Fujiwara leaders (see Fujiwara clan). Like them, the Minister marries his daughter to the emperor, has his grandchild appointed Heir Apparent and rules de facto after the abdication (in the Genji, after the death) of the emperor. Although one of Genji's enemy, the Minister is often portrayed as un-courtly, indiscreet, even headstrong, but never more evil or more determined to destroy Genji than his daughter, the Kokiden Consort. The Minister of the Right is also Tō no Chūjō's father-in-law.(chapter 1-chapter 13)
- Tō no Chūjō – The son of the Minister of the Left and brother of Aoi, he becomes Genji's friend and rival in love during the Prince's adolescence and youth. Their relationship remains fairly harmonious for the first twelve chapters of the tale: they engage in conversations about women, share their amorous experiences and love letters and, once in a while compete, or pretend to compete, in conquering a woman (with Suetsumuhana, the competition seems more genuine, whereas in the case of Gen no naishi, it is a mock-competition meant to create a humorous interlude). Unbeknownst to Tō no Chūjō however, Genji has an affair with one of his former mistresses, Yūgao, finds out about the existence of his friend's child, yet reveals nothing to him and, for all that we know, Tō no Chūjō remains ignorant of this affair until the end. After Genji's return from exile however, his friendly rivalry with Tō no Chūjō is no longer related to love matters, but becomes political. Although associated with the Fujiwara clan, Tō no Chūjō is not on the winning side: the daughters he sends to court are always outshined by Genji's own candidates so that Tō no Chūjō can never get to play the part of a Fujiwara regent. Later in the tale, the two heroes, Genji and Tō no Chūjō seem to reach some sort of reconciliation once Genji reveals to Tō no Chūjō the existence of his daughter, Tamakazura, and the latter finally accepts Yūgiri, Genji's son, as his son-in-law. To no Chujo, however, still remains jealous of Genji's fame and power, and the author often takes us into long passages of his anger and regret. To no Chujo is not entirely unsuccessful in his career, however-he eventually becomes Prime Minister and dies a great man. (chapter 1-chapter 41)
- Lady Aoi (Aoi no Ue) – Daughter of the Minister of the Left (Tō no Chūjō's sister) and Genji's first principal wife, she marries Genji when she is sixteen and he only twelve. Proud and distant to her husband, Aoi is constantly aware of the age difference between them and very much hurt by Genji's philandering. For only a short while, after giving birth to Genji's son, Yūgiri, and suffering episodes of spirit possession, does Aoi actually appear sympathetic in Genji's eyes. The episode of spirit possession itself (mono no ke) is extremely controversial and brings to the fore two female characters in the tale: Aoi (Genji's wife) and Lady Rokujō (Genji's mistress). The relationship between the two women may be that between victim and aggressor, if one follows the traditional interpretation of spirit possession, or that between accomplices expressing their discontent with the Heian system of polygynous marriage (and with Genji, obviously). Aoi dies at the end of the “Aoi” chapter and her exit from the tale is thus definitive.
  Aoi actually only says one line in the entire novel, and the rest of her appearances are mentions or her silence-in Chapter 9, where she is most relevant, Genji spends long times talking to her, but she is too weak to respond. Although she and Genji never had a true reconciliation in the book, Genji feels deep remorse after Aoi's death for not paying more attention to her and not holding her in higher regard. In one movie adaption, Genji and Aoi finally become a happy couple before a servant informs him of her death at a court meeting.
  Aoi's personality is described as proud and unforgiving, but she has an obvious motive for the latter. She is also described as a perfect lady, so much in fact that Genji is intimidated by her at times. (chapter 1-chapter 9)
- Governor of Kii (Ki no Kami) – One of Genji's retainers, he is the son of the Iyo Deputy and stepson of Utsusemi. Later becomes Governor of Kawachi. (chapters 2 and 16)
- The Iyo Deputy (Iyo no Suke) – He is the father of the Governor of Kii and husband of Utsusemi. Later becomes the Deputy Governor of Hitachi. In the fleeting moments he appears in Chapter 2, he is unhappy that Genji has stopped by his home, even if it is due to taboos, and doesn't like being ordered around by somebody he hardly knows. (chapters 2,4 and 16)
- Utsusemi (空蝉/Cicada Shell/ Lady of the Locust Shell) – She is the wife of the Iyo Deputy and stepmother of the Governor of Kii. She attracts Genji's attention, but resists his courtship despite his repeated attempts to win her over. Although she will not become a central character in the tale, Utsusemi is memorable as the first woman Genji courts in the tale and whose courtship the readers actually witness and also, arguably, as the first to resist him (chapters 2,3,4; reenters the tale in chapter 16; is mentioned again in chapter 23).
  A lady of lower rank, after the death of her father she has no choice but to become the second wife of the Iyo Deputy, whose first wife is dead at the time of the narrative (Chapter 2 “Hahakigi”). She accidentally attracts Genji's attention during one of his visits to the Governor of Kii's mansion. Forced to avoid a directional taboo, young Genji leaves his father-in-law's mansion at Sanjō and takes refuge to his retainer's house. Ritual purification also forced the women of the Iyo Deputy's household, Utsusemi included, to temporarily reside in the same place.
  Having heard some feminine voices and the movements in an adjacent room, Genji becomes interested in the Governor's step-mother, whom he already knew was young and potentially attractive. That very same night, Genji steals into the women's quarters and under the guise of being a lady-in-waiting (Utsusemi is calling for Chūjō, which is both the sobriquet of her servant and Genji's current rank of captain), he slips next to Utsusemi. Once the lady realizes who he really is, she is terrified and would like to call for help, were it not for her awareness that such a discovery would only bring her shame. Even so, she still rejects his advances and keeps strong despite his seductive words, until Genji, at a loss, can only think of taking her away to a more private location. As he carries her out of the room, he encounters the real Chūjō who is more than ready to defend her mistress against this unknown intruder until she too realizes who he is. Genji's rank and status is simply too high for the two women to dare raise a commotion.
  Once Genji secures Utsusemi's location, he continues to pour out sweet words and promises, yet the lady “was as (...) the young bamboo: she bent but was not to be broken.” Despite the textual description, many Genji critics read the incident as Genji's success despite the lady's resistance. Their interpretation lies heavily on one verb in the original, miru, which, although has multiple meanings, also refers to “making love, carnally knowing someone.” Because of this one meaning among many, the traditional interpretation of the scene was that Genji does manage to break through Utsusemi's defenses and ends up sleeping with her. Other critics however, most prominently Margaret Childs, prefer to reject this interpretation as unfounded.
  After the incident in question, Genji tries to see the lady two more times. The first time, she finds out about his arrival and takes refuge into another wing of the house, where she surrounds herself with her ladies-in-waiting. Frustrated, Genji ends up taking her younger brother to bed, as her replacement. This episode is considered the sole explicit example of homosexual relations in the tale.
  The second time, Genji manages to get close to her and he even gets to spy on her playing go with her step-daughter, Nokiba no ogi. This kaimami (man spying on one or multiple women through a gap in the fence/ curtain/ screen) became a favorite screen among Genji artists and has been often illustrated as representation for chapter 3 “Utsusemi.”
  After having spied on her, Genji, with the complicity of Utsusemi's younger brother, Kogimi, steals into her chamber again. Aware of his presence, Utsusemi manages to escape from Genji's embrace by discarding her outer robe like a cicada discards its shell (hence the chapter title). In her desire to escape him, the lady also abandons behind her sleeping step-daughter, who becomes Genji's unwitting prey. Unwilling to admit defeat, or rather to sleep alone for the night, Genji makes do with what is left behind and ends sleeping with Nokiba no ogi, who does not even imagine she has been the victim of mistaken identity.
  At the end of the fourth chapter, "Yugao", Utsusemi leaves the capital with her husband who has been appointed governor of a province. Nokiba no ogi also gets married and leaves the narrative. Utsusemi returns in chapter sixteen, “Sekiya,” when she meets Genji on her return from the provinces. They exchange poems, and Utsusemi is shown to regret not being able to accept Genji's advances (because of Utsusemi's marriage and differences in rank).
  Last time the readers encounter Utsusemi is in chapter twenty-three, “Hatsune,” where they learn that she has become a nun after her husband's death. The reason behind her decision is her desire to escape the unwelcome amorous attentions of her step-son, the Governor of Kii. After taking the tonsure, Utsusemi comes to depend upon Genji and takes residence in his former home (his home before the building of the Rokujō-in), Nijō-in.
- Chūjō (Utsusemi's Chūjō) – She is Utsusemi's servant. Her name literally means “the captain.” Genji was a Captain in the Palace Guards at the time of his meeting with Utsusemi, so he is able to steal into the lady's chambers by taking advantage of the confusion between Chūjō's name and his rank. (Utsusemi calls for Chūjō and Genji pretends he misinterpreted her words). Because there are six other ladies-in-waiting in the tale all referred to as “Chūjō”, the best way to differentiate among them is by the identities of their mistresses or masters.(chapter 2)
- Kogimi – He is Utsusemi's brother and 12 or 13 at the time of the narrative in the “Hahakigi” chapter. Genji is delighted with the boy and uses him as a go-between in the letter exchanges with Utsusemi and Nokiba no ogi. At the end of the “Hahakigi” chapter, frustrated because he cannot reach Utsusemi, who took refuge in a different pavilion of the Governor of Kii's mansion, Genji beds little Kogimi as a replacement for his sister. This episode constitutes the only open reference to homosexuality (and pederasty) in the tale. The boy reappears in chapter sixteen, “Sekiya”, as Second of the Right Gate Watch (in Tyler's translation), but by then he is already an adult and of no relevance to the narrative.(chapters 2 and 3; reappears in chapter 16)
- Nokiba no Ogi – She is the daughter of the Iyo Deputy and the sister of the Governor of Kii, in other words, Utsusemi's stepdaughter. She is a fleeting presence in the tale and only briefly does she take center stage in chapter three, “Utsusemi.” During his pursuit of the Lady of the Locust Shell, Genji engages in kaimami (lit. “peeping through a hole”) on Utsusemi and Nokiba no ogi playing go. When later, he intrudes into the lady's bedchamber with Kogimi's complicity, Genji fails to capture Utsusemi, who flees leaving behind her outer robe and her sleeping stepdaughter. Having been caught in a case of mistaken identity, Genji cannot extricate himself from the situation and ends up sleeping with Nokiba no ogi (whom he woos into believing she is indeed the object of his desire). Needless to say that Genji quickly forgets this unfortunate event and, later, when he finds out about the girl's prospective marriage, he is confident that, married or not, Nokiba no ogi will never refuse his advances.(chapters 3,4)
- Koremitsu – He is Genji's foster brother (in fact his milk brother, menotogo; Koremitsu's mother was Genji's wet nurse), trusted servant and accomplice. He plays his most prominent part in the “Yūgao” chapter, where he approaches Yūgao and facilitates Genji's subsequent courtship of the lady. After Yūgao's death, it is Koremitsu who carries her dead body and arranges for her funeral rites. Similarly to the Yūgao episode, Koremitsu also serves Genji in the following chapter, “Wakamurasaki,” where he acts as a go-between for Genji and Shōnagon, Murasaki's nurse, as well as Genji's accomplice in the kidnapping of Murasaki. A very useful servant and mediator in Genji's love affairs, Koremitsu even accompanies Genji during his exile to Suma. Later in the tale, however, his presence becomes more sporadic.(chapters 4–21)
- Yūgao – She is a woman of lower status of about nineteen with whom Genji has a short affair in the eponymous chapter four, “Yūgao.” Before encountering Genji, Yūgao was Tō no Chūjō's mistress and even gave him a daughter, the future Tamakazura. However, because of the jealousy of Tō no Chūjō's main wife, Yūgao leaves him and goes into hiding. It is under these circumstances that Genji encounters her, while out visiting his former wet nurse (Koremitsu's mother). The woman's name translates as “Evening Faces” and refers to the flowers that attract Genji's attraction to Yūgao's shabby abode. Genji becomes very fond of this woman, of whom he apparently knows next to nothing, and proceeds to move her to an abandoned mansion where she falls prey to spirit possession and dies. The possessing spirit is traditionally associated with Lady Rokujō. (chapter 4)
- Ukon (Yūgao's Ukon) – She is the daughter of Yūgao's nurse and the lady-in-waiting closest to Yūgao. Orphaned at an early age, Ukon was raised by Yūgao's father and grew up together with the lady, whom she is extremely attached to. After losing Yūgao, she wants to follow her mistress into death, but gives in to Genji's pleas and enters his service. She will come to play a great role in the discovery of Yūgao's daughter, Tamakazura. There are two other ladies-in-waiting named Ukon in the tale (one in the service of Naka no Kimi, the other in the service of Ukifune, but only the latter plays a similarly important role as Yūgao's Ukon).(chapters 4 and 22)
- Lady Rokujō (Rokujō no miyasudokoro) – She is a lady of high birth and Genji's senior by seven years. Introduced in the tale narrative in chapter four, “Yūgao,” as Genji's lover, Rokujō is not mentioned in any of the previous chapters. Nevertheless, the later narrative does clarify certain biographical aspects related to this lady. Thus, she is the widow of a former Crown Prince (presumably one of Emperor Kiritsubo's brothers) and would have become an empress, if not for her husband's untimely death. Because of her outstanding social position, she is entitled to be treated with the utmost respect, a fact which Genji, too caught up in his philandering, neglects to do. Humiliated by Genji's disrespect for her, angered and jealous by the rumors of his affairs, Rokujō becomes the perfect candidate for being the possessing spirit behind Yūgao's demise, at least in traditional interpretations of the tale. Her identification as possessing spirit is further reinforced in the “Aoi” chapter, where several clues seem to make her the culprit in Aoi's possession and death. Troubled by the gossip about her involvement in Aoi's possession, Rokujō herself comes to believe in her own guilt. As a result, she decides to follow her daughter, appointed as Priestess, to Ise. After her return to the capital, she entrusts her daughter, Akikonomu, to Genji and dies in chapter fourteen, “Miotsukushi.” Following her death, she keeps being identified as the spirit inflicting torment upon Genji's women, Murasaki and the Third Princess to be exact. (chapters 4–14; as the presumed possessing spirit, chapters 35,36)
- Lady Murasaki (Murasaki no Ue) – She is the daughter of Prince Hyōbu by a minor consort and related to Fujitsubo on her father's side (Hyōbu is Fujitsubo's brother, hence Murasaki is Fujitsubo's niece). She makes her debut into the tale as a substitute for her unattainable aunt, but she gradually outshines Fujitsubo in Genji's and the readers’ eyes, turning into “a substitute for all seasons.” In fact, her very name, “Murasaki” translated as “Lavender,” plays on the similarity of two colors (the color “murasaki” is purple of a darker hue than “fuji”, wisteria, of Fujitsubo's name). Discovered by Genji in the Northern Hills when she is only ten, she is taken into his Nijō residence after the death of her grandmother (the episode of her kidnapping has definite violent undertones) where she is molded into Genji's ideal woman, not unlike the myth of Galatea, with whom she is often compared. She remains Genji's most important lover throughout the tale, but, because of her imperfect social status (she is of royal blood on her father's side, but her mother was a commoner), she can never be acknowledged as Genji's main wife (kita no kata). For that reason, her position is perpetually insecure, especially when Genji's attention shifts to other women including Akashi, Asagao, but most importantly, the Third Princess. Childless her entire life, Murasaki can only adopt Genji's daughter by the Akashi Lady and raise her to become an empress. Towards the end of her life, she repeatedly expresses her desire to become a nun, but meets Genji's resolute opposition. She becomes the victim of spirit possession in chapter 35 (the aggressor is once more identified as Rokujō, though this interpretation has been debated) and dies in chapter 40 without having realized her wish. Murasaki as a character of the Genji has triggered much debate among scholars. Some see her as an utterly miserable character, while others claim that her relationship with Genji is the best things that could have happened to a woman of Murasaki's status. The beauty of this character resides precisely in its complexity. (chapters 5–40)
- Shōnagon (Murasaki's Shōnagon) – She is Murasaki's nurse and most important protector after the grandmother. Even so, after the grandmother's death, Shōnagon is not high-ranking enough to oppose Genji's plans and, faced with the decision of either to follow her young mistress to Genji's Nijō (at the risk of being accused of kidnapping by Prince Hyōbu, once he finds out the girl is missing) or to abandon her, she takes the first choice. Later, impressed by Genji's social standing as well as by the care he devotes to Murasaki, Shōnagon is quite happy with her decision. As Murasaki ages, Shōnagon slips out of the narrative unnoticed. (chapters 4–12)
- Kitayama no Amagimi (The Nun, Murasaki's grandmother) – She is Murasaki's maternal grandmother who took custody of the child after the mother's death. While alive, she adamantly rejects Genji's offers of taking care of the girl because she sees through his innocent-looking pleas and guesses his ulterior sexual designs for Murasaki. At the same time, she does not want Murasaki to return to her father's household for fear of Prince Hyōbu's main wife, whose jealousy of Murasaki's mother might make her persecute the child as well. After the grandmother's death, Genji takes advantage of the situation and spirits Murasaki away before her father is able to take her into his household. (chapter 5)
- Prince Hyōbu (His Highness of War/ Hyōbukyō no Miya) – He is Fujitsubo's brother and Murasaki's father. Of royal blood (like Fujitsubo, he is the son of a former emperor), Prince Hyōbu is married with a woman suiting his high status who is extremely jealous of Murasaki's mother, a woman below her own social position. The text goes as far as to suggest that Murasaki's mother died because of the constant harassment of Hyōbu's main wife, not unlike Kiritsubo. After the woman's death however, Hyōbu and his wife are both willing to take Murasaki into their household, but Genji kidnaps her before Hyōbu can act. When Murasaki becomes Genji's wife, Hyōbu is informed of his daughter's fate and, for a while, his relationship with Murasaki seems good. Once Genji falls out of favor and is exiled however, Hyōbu cuts all ties with his daughter, a mistake which Genji will not forgive after he rises to the top of the political hierarchy.
- Elderly Lady (ja: 源典侍 Gen-no-naishinosuke) – Although most likely in her late forties, the elderly lady still gains the favor of Genji. In The Tale of Genji she flirts with Genji, even though he knows any relationship with her would be inappropriate.
- Princess Hitachi (also Old Style Princess) – Because her nose is so big, the traditionally minded princess never shows her face in public and is very shy. However, because of her talent at playing the zither, Genji becomes attracted to her.
- Oborozukiyo – The sixth daughter (Roku no Kimi) of the Minister of the Right, and the younger sister of Lady Kokiden. At one time, she was the intended of Suzaku, but was raped by a drunk Genji in Chapter 8 (after a party held by the Emperor to honor the cherry tree in front of the Shishinden). After meeting again at her father's party several weeks later, Oborozukiyo falls in love with Genji, and they have a secret relationship. The discovery of this relationship, which continues after Oborozukiyo enters court for Suzaku during the early years of his reign as emperor, is one of the catalysts for Genji's exile.
- Lady Akashi – Born as a middle-ranked noble, a love affair with Genji was not her own plan, but her father was insistent in getting them involved in a relationship. She gives a birth to a girl, the only daughter of Genji. She brings up her daughter (called Little Lady Akashi, later Empress Akashi) until the age of four, when Genji decides that Lady Murasaki should adopt the little girl. Lady Akashi is saddened, but gradually accepts the situation. Later, she meets her daughter again, now a court lady of the crown prince, and receives many honors as the birth mother of little Lady Akashi. She then receives a letter from her father about his fortune-telling dream. He writes the dream gave him a prediction that his granddaughter by Lady Akashi would become the empress, and he turned all his efforts to realize that prediction.
- Yūgiri – The son of Genji and Aoi. His mother dies days after his birth, and he is raised by Genji's father-in-law the Minister of the Left when Genji goes into exile. On Genji's return, Yūgiri serves as a page in the Emperor's court. Chapter 21 revolves around his education and romance with Kumoinokari when both are 14. The match is long opposed by her father Tō No Chūjō, but they eventually win him over and marry in Chapters 32-33. He is the best friend of Kashiwagi, but when that man takes his own life, Yūgiri becomes obsessed with his widow, the neglected Second Princess. Kumoinokari returns to her father's house with their daughters in the wake of this scandalous affair. (Chapters 12-52)
- Tamakazura – A daughter of Tō No Chūjō and a lady called Yugao, who was later a concubine of Genji. Tamakazura is adopted by Genji. She wants to meet her real father, who doesn't know she is still alive. Genji forms a salon for her admirers. He takes pleasure in watching young men compete for Tamakazura's favor. Her brothers, sons of Tō No Chūjō, are involved, not knowing that she is their sister. Genji himself flirts with her, just to see her reaction. Later, she and Tō No Chūjō meet again by the courtesy of Genji. Genji plans to marry her well, but she is raped by a middle-aged courtier and becomes his wife instead.

=== Part II ===
- Kashiwagi – is the eldest son of Naidaijin (Tō No Chūjō in his youth) and best friend to Yūgiri. He has an affair with Genji's youngest wife, Onna san no miya (lit. the Third Princess), which results in the birth of Kaoru. When the affair is discovered, he slowly takes his own life.
- Third Princess (Onna san no miya/Nyosan (in Waley's translation)) – is the beloved daughter of Emperor Suzaku and wife of Genji in his later years. She is a niece of late Empress Fujitsubo in her maternal lineage. As Genji's wife she is young and naive. Kashiwagi exploits her innocence and rapes her, their affair resulting in the birth of Kaoru.

=== Part III ===
- Kaoru – is the protagonist of Part III. Legally he is known as the son of Genji and Onna san no miya but his real father is the late Kashiwagi. Learning this secret makes him noncommittal and lean towards Buddhism. He falls in love with Oigimi in Uji, the first daughter of Hachinomiya, but she dies. He later fell in love with Ukifune whose features are quite similar to the late Oigimi, but their relationship also fails.
- Perfumed Highness or Fragrant Highness (Nio no miya) – Nio no miya is the third prince of the current Emperor by Empress Akashi, therefore a grandson of Genji. Nio no miya is the best friend of Kaoru. He is known as a man of love affairs. He falls in love with Naka no kimi in Uji, the second daughter of Hachinomiya and the younger sister of Oigimi. Despite some opposition, he makes Naka no kimi his wife. He rapes Ukifune, her half-sister, and this incident drives her to attempt suicide.
- Oigimi – the elder daughter of Hachinomiya (The 8th Prince), pursued by Kaoru. She stops eating, becomes sick and dies after failing to take care of Nakanokimi.
- Naka no kimi – the younger daughter of Hachinomiya, pursued by (and made wife of) Niou.
- Ukifune – An illegitimate daughter of Hachinomiya, the eighth prince of Emperor Kiritsubo. Her presence is rejected by her father. She eventually meets her half-sister Naka no kimi, the second daughter of Hachinomiya, and now a wife of Nio no miya. While she is staying with her sister, Nio no miya becomes obsessed with her, and later rapes her. Suffering a sense of betrayal Ukifune decides to die and dives into Uji River. Her life is saved by a passing Buddhist monk priest. Ukifune decides to become a nun and refuses to acknowledge Kaoru, who sends her brother as a messenger and tries to persuade her to come back to him.
