= Minamoto-kun Monogatari =

Japanese manga series

- First tankōbon volume cover, featuring Kaoruko Fujiwara

源君物語
- Genre: Romantic comedy
- Manga
- Written by: Minori Inaba
- Published by: Shueisha
- Imprint: Young Jump Comics
- Magazine: Weekly Young Jump
- Original run: September 15, 2011 – September 5, 2019
- Volumes: 16
- icon

Minamoto-kun Monogatari (源君物語; lit. 'Minamoto's Story') is a Japanese manga series written and illustrated by Minori Inaba. It was serialized in Shueisha's seinen manga magazine Weekly Young Jump from September 2011 to September 2019, with its chapters collected in sixteen tankōbon volumes.

== Plot ==
Terumi Minamoto is a university student with distinctly feminine features that often lead others to mistake him for a woman. During middle school, he endured persistent bullying orchestrated by classmate Tsukasa Chuujou, resulting in lasting trauma that manifested as gynophobia and a milk aversion. Upon enrolling at Shiun University, he moves into his aunt Kaoruko Fujiwara's residence—a non-tenured professor at his institution—after his father remarries.

Kaoruko initiates an unconventional project requiring Terumi to seduce fourteen women, modeled after characters from The Tale of Genji. Over two years, these encounters gradually alleviate his fear of women while Kaoruko provides sexual tutelage, stopping short of consummation due to their familial relationship. Kaoruko observes that Terumi's attraction to older women likely originates from unresolved maternal attachment following his mother's premature death.

During this period, Terumi reconciles with Tsukasa, discovering her involvement in an unhappy affair with Professor Konoe. Their renewed interactions lead to mutual personal growth, with Tsukasa developing romantic feelings for him. After completing thirteen encounters, Kaoruko reveals herself as the final target and explains the experiment's dual purpose: academic research and personal development honoring Terumi's late mother.

The story concludes one year later with Terumi having overcome his traumas, evidenced by his ability to drink milk comfortably, while pursuing academic interests in The Tale of Genji studies.

== Characters ==
=== Main characters ===
Terumi Minamoto (源光海, Minamoto Terumi)
Terumi is a university student whose feminine appearance made him the target of bullying by female classmates since middle school, resulting in an inability to form intimate relationships with women. His circumstances change when he moves in with his aunt Kaoruko, who involves him in a project recreating scenarios from The Tale of Genji as a means to overcome his gynophobia. His surname derives from the Minamoto clan that Hikaru Genji adopted for being demoted from the succession. Terumi gradually develops confidence through these experiences, forming numerous relationships with women. Due to losing his mother at a young age, Terumi has a Oedipus complex, which Kaoruko stokes in order for him to engage with older females. In the story's conclusion, this culminates in a sexual relationship with Kaoruko.
Kaoruko Fujiwara (藤原香子, Fujiwara Kaoruko)
Kaoruko is Terumi's aunt and a university literature professor specializing in The Tale of Genji. She devises an experiment requiring Terumi to pursue relationships with fourteen women corresponding to characters from the classical tale. As a sophisticated and composed academic, she employs unconventional methods to help Terumi overcome his fear of women, including physical intimacy that tests but initially maintains familial boundaries. Though initially choosing celibacy in her youth, she later reconsiders this stance. While demonstrating apparent affection for Terumi, she primarily focuses on fostering his personal growth. The experiment culminates with Kaoruko assuming the role of Fujitsubo, the final target, and has sex with Terumi.

=== Targets ===
Kaoruko designates these women as "Targets", each representing one of Hikaru Genji's lovers from The Tale of Genji. As part of her research, she directs Terumi to pursue relationships with them.

Asahi Momozono (桃園 朝日, Momozono Asahi)
As the first target and Terumi's cousin, she reconnects with him after years of estrangement. An aspiring librarian who eventually achieves this career goal, she initially resists Terumi's romantic advances but gradually accepts his affection. When she imposes celibacy as a condition for dating, Terumi declines. Though she later develops romantic feelings for him, she remains hesitant to pursue the relationship. Unaware that Terumi has slept with her best friend Tsukiko, she confides in Tsukiko about her personal struggles. The character is based on Asagao no Kimi from The Tale of Genji.
Aoi Kiriyama (桐山 葵, Kiriyama Aoi)
The second target, Aoi owns a nail salon and employs Terumi as her assistant when he offers to help with household chores. Their brief sexual encounter reveals her father complex, which disrupts their intimacy when she calls out for her father. Despite this, they maintain a friendly relationship, and Aoi later protects Terumi from Miya's interference, relating to their shared parental fixations. The character is based on Aoi no Ue from The Tale of Genji.
Chisato Hanada (花田 千里, Hanada Chisato)
The third target, Hanada studies Home Economics while working at a soba shop. Extremely self-conscious about her large breasts, she initially struggles with shyness. She becomes Terumi's first proper girlfriend and sexual partner. Though Terumi considers abandoning the Genji project for her, he ultimately continues after realizing her feelings for him are not deeply romantic. Their relationship helps Hanada become more confident about her body. The character is based on Hanachirusato from The Tale of Genji.
Miya Rokujou (六条 美也, Rokujou Miya)
The fourth target, Miya works as an Information Processing Tutor at Terumi's university. Previously his middle school teacher, she develops an obsessive fixation on Terumi, demonstrated through stalking behavior and covering her apartment walls with his photographs. When Terumi ends their cohabitation to continue the Genji project, she repeatedly attempts to sabotage his subsequent relationships, requiring Kaoruko's intervention. The character is based on Lady Rokujō from The Tale of Genji.
Shian Kowaka (小若 紫亜, Kowaka Shian)
The fifth target, Shian is a young girl with an innocent demeanor. Kaoruko selects her to help Terumi become comfortable with younger women following his difficult experience with Miya. Shian views Terumi as an older brother figure and dreams of marrying him when she grows older. Due to her youth, their relationship remains platonic. The character is based on Murasaki no Ue from The Tale of Genji.
Iyo Semi (瀬見 伊予, Semi Iyo)
The sixth target, Semi works as a university shop clerk. Trapped in an unfulfilling long-term relationship, she initially avoids confronting her dissatisfaction. Her encounter with Terumi leads to a brief affair that helps her end the stagnant relationship. Though she retains feelings for Terumi, she avoids him afterward out of embarrassment. By the story's conclusion, she leaves her retail position to become Gennai's secretary. The character is based on Utsusemi from The Tale of Genji.
Yuu Tokonatsu (常夏 夕, Tokonatsu Yuu)
The seventh target, Yuu works as a fitness instructor, having overcome childhood illness that previously confined her to bed. Her lack of prior romantic experience makes Terumi her first serious relationship, which provokes Miya's jealousy. Though Terumi considers abandoning the Genji project for Yuu, their relationship ends when she accepts a job opportunity in Osaka, believing Terumi harbors deeper feelings for Kaoruko. Yuu later admits she still loves Terumi but does not pursue reconciliation. The character is based on Yuugao from The Tale of Genji.
Hana Suetsumu (末摘 華, Suetsumu Hana)
The eighth target, Hana is a broadcasting student aspiring to become a voice actress. Her shy nature and high-pitched voice make socializing difficult. Kaoruko arranges for Terumi to partner with Hana for voice acting practice, which leads to intimacy between them. This experience helps Hana overcome her social anxiety, enabling her to befriend other women in Terumi's life, particularly bonding with Hanada over their shared insecurities. By the story's conclusion, she achieves her goal of becoming a professional voice actress. The character is based on the Safflower Princess from The Tale of Genji.
Noriko Gennai (源内 典子, Gennai Noriko)
The ninth target, Gennai is a dentist who owns her own clinic. Despite her youthful appearance and cheerful demeanor, she harbors narcissistic tendencies. Aware of Kaoruko's project, she willingly participates and develops genuine affection for Terumi through their repeated sexual encounters. These experiences gradually diminish her self-absorption. By the story's conclusion, she employs Semi as her secretary. The character is based on Gen no Naishinosuke from The Tale of Genji.
Ruri Tamakazura (玉鬘 るり, Tamakazura Ruri)
The tenth target, Ruri is a sheltered high school student and daughter of a local mistress who bears a resemblance to Yuu. Meeting Terumi during a training course, she experiences the outside world for the first time while facing pressure from marriage proposals. Kaoruko has Terumi disguise himself as a woman to protect Ruri, culminating in him rescuing her from an assault by her prospective husband Kurohige. Though she never learns Terumi's true identity, Ruri develops affection for him. She later enrolls at Shiun University and befriends Nagiko and Akashi. The character is based on Tamakazura from The Tale of Genji.
Tsukiko Ooboro (朧 月子, Ooboro Tsukiko)
The eleventh target, Tsukiko is Asahi's friend and an aspiring erotic novelist. She suffers from severe androphobia stemming from childhood trauma, with Terumi being the only man she can tolerate due to his feminine appearance. Their friendship develops as Terumi serves as both confidant and inspiration for her writing. Through their relationship, which includes a sexual encounter while Terumi is cross-dressed, Tsukiko gradually overcomes her fear of men, eventually conversing comfortably with other males. The character is based on Oborozukiyo from The Tale of Genji.
Otome Mitsumiya (三宮乙女, Mitsumiya Otome)
The twelfth target, Otome is a withdrawn middle school student and Shian's best friend. Initially unmotivated despite her potential, she begins applying herself after Terumi tutors her and discovers her love of cats. When Terumi promises to take her to visit stray cats, she grows more engaged in her studies. Overhearing Terumi praise her abilities, she develops romantic feelings for him and resolves to become someone worthy of his attention. Through this experience, Otome becomes more outgoing, even accepting Murakami as her subsequent tutor. The character is based on Onna san no Miya from The Tale of Genji.
Akashi Mutsuge (明石夢告, Mutsuge Akashi)
The thirteenth target, Akashi is a fortune teller from the countryside. After an awkward first encounter, Terumi gains her trust by assisting at her family's inn during summer break. Their discussions about relationships lead to mutual intimacy, with Akashi requesting a temporary romantic partnership. She becomes one of Terumi's frequent sexual partners during this period. When Terumi confesses his feelings for Kaoruko, Akashi supports his pursuit. The character is based on Akashi no Kata from The Tale of Genji.

=== Other characters ===
Tsukasa Chuujou (中将 つかさ, Chūjō Tsukasa)
Tsukasa is Terumi's former middle school bully whose jealousy over his feminine appearance caused his lasting fear of women and milk. Though outwardly popular and kind, she secretly exhibits sadistic tendencies. When they meet again at university, Tsukasa fails to recognize Terumi, who deliberately sabotages her affair with Professor Konoe as revenge. After Terumi kisses her while cross-dressed, Tsukasa develops romantic feelings for him, admiring his newfound confidence. Though these emotions remain unfulfilled, their interactions help Terumi overcome his childhood trauma.
Konoe (近衛)
A prominent professor at Shiun University, Konoe maintains a reputation as its most popular male faculty member despite his infidelity. He engages in an affair with Tsukasa until Terumi, disguised as a woman, manipulates their relationship, leading Konoe to end it publicly to protect his image. Terumi criticizes Konoe's cowardice, exposing his selfishness to Tsukasa. Konoe later attempts to leverage his influence during a beauty pageant, proposing a wager to sleep with Kaoruko in exchange for professional favors, though this comes to nothing. His lingering presence contributes to Kaoruko's eventual decision to leave the university and escape his sphere of influence.
Murakami (村上)
Murakami is Terumi's classmate who enrolls at Shiun University primarily to pursue Kaoruko, his idealized romantic interest. Despite his earnest efforts with women, Kaoruko considers him too inexperienced for her project. He struggles with jealousy toward Terumi's success with women but eventually becomes Otome's tutor after Terumi. By the story's conclusion, he abandons his fixation on Kaoruko and begins a relationship with Otome's older half-sister. The character is only referred to by his family name.
Nagiko Ooboro (朧 凪子, Ooboro Nagiko)
Nagiko is Tsukiko's younger sister who shares her interest in literature, particularly The Tale of Genji. Initially unimpressed with Terumi despite her sister's praise, she later develops curiosity about his androgynous appearance. Unlike Tsukiko, she exhibits no fear of men. She befriends Ruri and Akashi, deliberately maintaining Ruri's unawareness of Terumi's true gender. She frequently expresses her opinions on social media.

== Publication ==
Written and illustrated by Minori Inaba, Minamoto-kun Monogatari was serialized in Shueisha's seinen manga magazine Weekly Young Jump from September 15, 2011, to September 5, 2019. Shueisha collected its chapters in sixteen tankōbon volumes, released from April 19, 2012, to November 19, 2019.

=== Volumes ===
No.	Japanese release date	Japanese ISBN
1	April 19, 2012	978-4-08-879318-4
2	October 19, 2012	978-4-08-879432-7
3	April 19, 2013	978-4-08-879550-8
4	October 18, 2013	978-4-08-879668-0
5	April 18, 2014	978-4-08-879783-0
6	October 17, 2014	978-4-08-890028-5
7	April 17, 2015	978-4-08-890142-8
8	October 19, 2015	978-4-08-890257-9
9	April 19, 2016	978-4-08-890391-0
10	November 18, 2016	978-4-08-890519-8
11	May 19, 2017	978-4-08-890644-7
12	November 17, 2017	978-4-08-890784-0
13	May 18, 2018	978-4-08-891012-3
14	November 19, 2018	978-4-08-891122-9
15	May 17, 2019	978-4-08-891314-8
16	November 19, 2019	978-4-08-891399-5

== Reception ==
Volume 3 reached the 48th place on the weekly Oricon manga charts and, by April 20, 2013, had sold 24,973 copies; volume 4 reached the 27th place and, by October 27, 2013, had sold 53,436 copies; volume 5 reached the 24th place and, by April 27, 2014, had sold 61,646 copies; volume 6 reached the 34th place and, by October 19, 2014, had sold 35,693 copies; volume 7 reached the 25th place and, by April 26, 2015, had sold 65,645 copies.

On Manga News, the series has a staff rating of 15 out of 20. On Manga Sanctuary, it has a staff rating from one staff member of 6 out of 10.

== See also ==
- Batsu Hare, another manga series by the same author
