= Yukiko Takayama =

Japanese screenwriter (1939/1940–2023)

- Born: April 4, 1940
- Died: June 2, 2023 (aged 78); Setagaya, Tokyo, Japan
- Occupations: Screenwriter; film director
- Years active: 1974–2011
- Notable work: Terror of Mechagodzilla; Hoshi no Ko Chobin; Monarch: The Big Bear of Tallac; Genji Monogatari: Sennen no Nazo

Yukiko Takayama (Japanese: 高山 由紀子, Hepburn: Takayama Yukiko; 4 April 1940 – 2 June 2023) was a Japanese screenwriter and director known for Terror of Mechagodzilla, Hoshi no Ko Chobin, Monarch: The Big Bear of Tallac, Hissatsu Shigotonin, and Genji Monogatari: Sennen no Nazo.

== Biography ==
Yukiko Takayama, a native of Tokyo, was born on April 4, 1940. (Note: Gendai Nihon Jinmeiroku gives a birth date of 4 April 1945, but the obituaries give a death age of 83.) She was the daughter of Nihonga painter Tatsuo Takayama. After graduating from the Keio University Faculty of Letters, she studied film screenwriting at the Scenario Center (a vocational school for screenwriters) while working as a housewife.

After writing for the 1974 anime Hoshi no Ko Chobin, Takayama made her debut as a screenwriter with Terror of Mechagodzilla (1975), the fifteenth film in the Godzilla franchise, after being selected for Ishirō Honda's Godzilla screenplay contest for screenwriting school students. She was the franchise's first female main staff member. She was later a screenwriter for the 1977 anime Monarch: The Big Bear of Tallac. She also wrote for the Hissatsu television series, writing three episodes each for Hissatsu Shigotonin (1981–1982) and Hissatsu Shigotonin Gekitotsu (1991–1992).

Takayama also worked as a film director, starting with Kaze no Katami (1996) and later Musume Dojoji: Jaen no Koi. In 2011, Takayama released the novel Genji Monogatari: Sennen no Nazo. The book later had a film adaptation, and she was credited as one of the film's screenwriters. She also worked at the Scenario Center as a lecturer.

Takayama died at home in Setagaya at 11:16, on 2 June 2023, with some reports erroneously stating her age to be 83. Her funeral took place on 12 June at Koyasan Tokyo Betsuin.

== Works ==
=== Film screenplays ===
- Terror of Mechagodzilla (1975)
- Genji Monogatari: Sennen no Nazo (2011)

=== Television screenplays ===
- Hoshi no Ko Chobin (1974)
- Tokubetsu Kidō Sōsa-tai (1976; episodes 719 and 747)
- Monarch: The Big Bear of Tallac (1977)
- Hissatsu Shigotonin (1981–1982; episodes 9, 15, 17)
- Kūhaku Meiro (1982)
- Shigotonin Daishugō (1982)
- Natsu no Arashi (1989; ep 11 to 15)
- Tsukikage Hyōgo Abare Tabi (1989; season 1 episodes 4 and 10)
- Tsuki Umaya Oen Jiken-chō (1990; season 1 episode 5)
- Makeup (1990)
- Tsukikage Hyōgo Abare Tabi (1990; season 2 episodes 4 and 9)
- Hissatsu Shigotonin Gekitotsu (1991–1992; episodes 5, 11, and 18)
- Tsuki Umaya Oen Jiken-chō (1993; season 2 episode 7)
- Tsuki Umaya Oen Jiken-chō Special: Onna no Sono ni Chiru Hanasaku Hana! Yoshiwara to Ōoku no Hikari to Kage! (1993)

=== Films directed ===
- Kaze no Katami (1996)
- Musume Dojoji: Jaen no Koi
