= Sutra copying =

East Asian practice of copying of holy texts

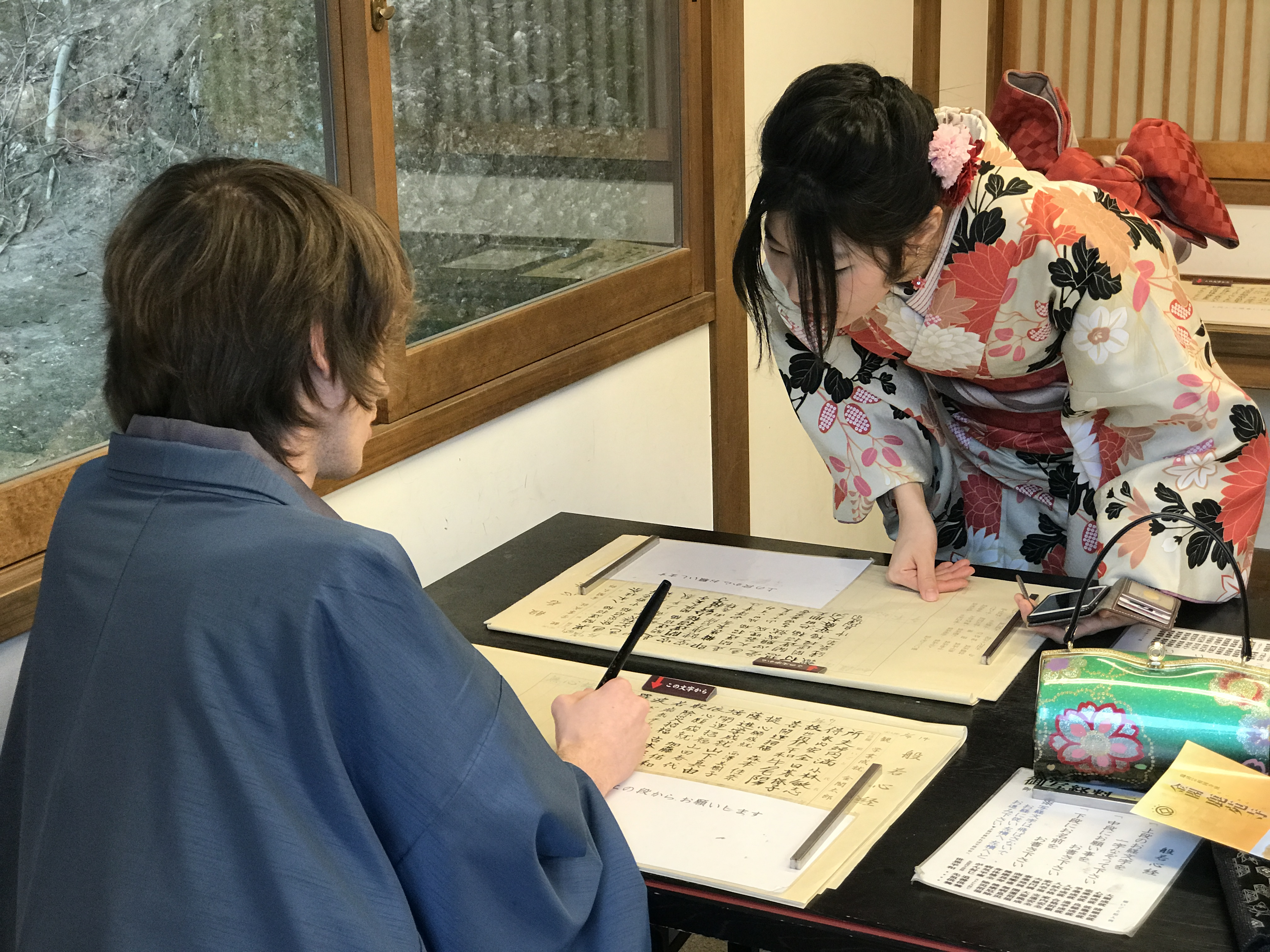
Modern sutra copying in Japan

Sutra copying (Chinese: 抄經, chāojīng; Japanese: 写経, shakyō) is the East Asian practice of hand-copying Buddhist sutras.

Sutra copying involves the meticulous hand-transcription of Buddhist scriptures as an act of devotion, study, meditation, and merit-making. This tradition dates back to Indian Mahayana Buddhism which saw the practice of copying sutras as highly meritorious. Practitioners engage in this process to generate merit, cultivate mindfulness, calm concentration, deepen their understanding of the Buddhist teachings and preserve the Buddhist Dharma for future generations.

In East Asian Mahayana traditions, sutra copying remains a prominent practice. Commonly copied texts include the Heart Sutra and Amitābha Sūtra, due to their short length and doctrinal significance. Today, the practice is still popular among lay and monastic communities, with some temples offering it as a meditative activity for visitors.

== Purpose ==
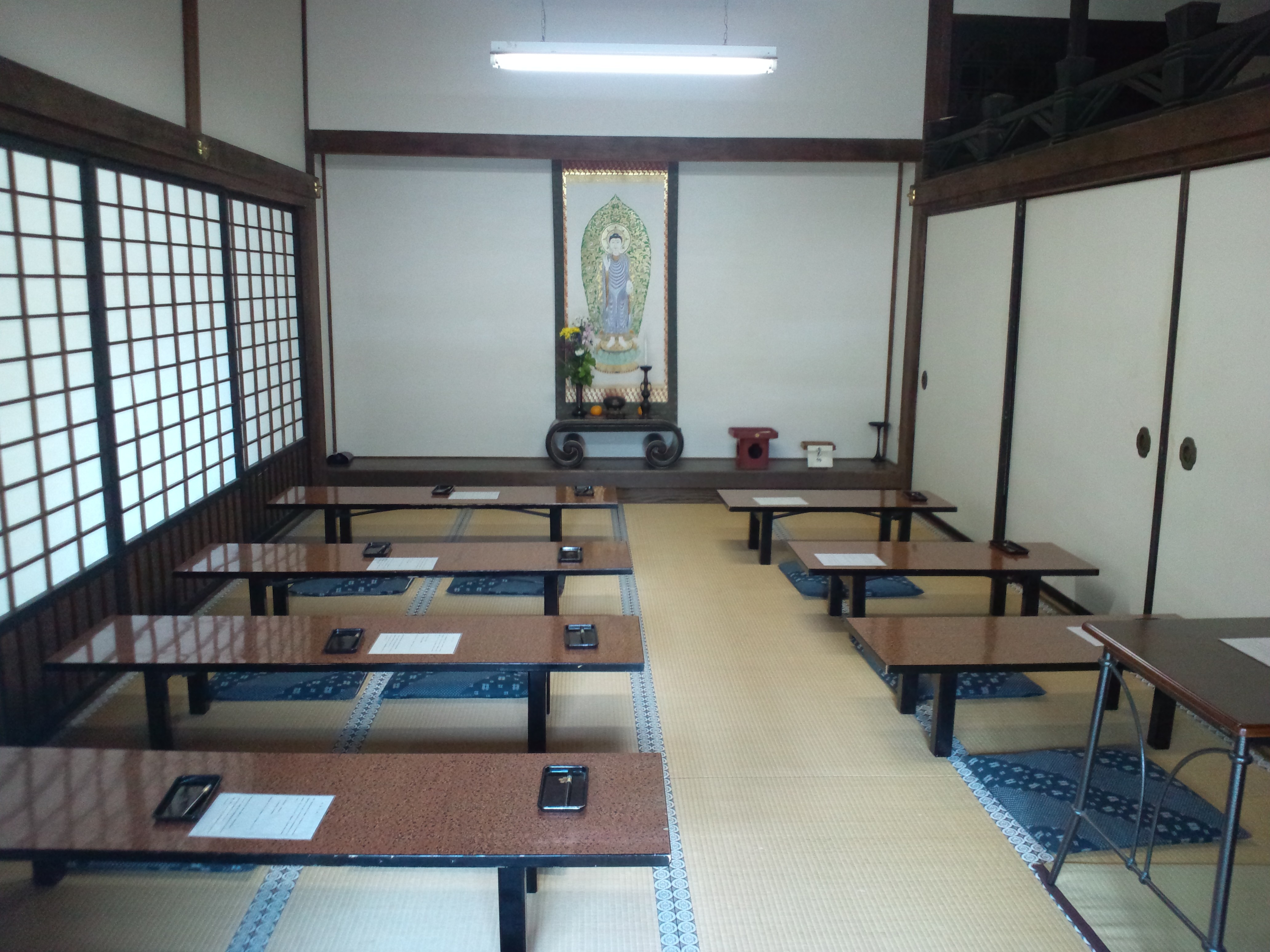
Sutra copying room at Seiryō-ji Buddhist Temple, a Jōdo-shū temple

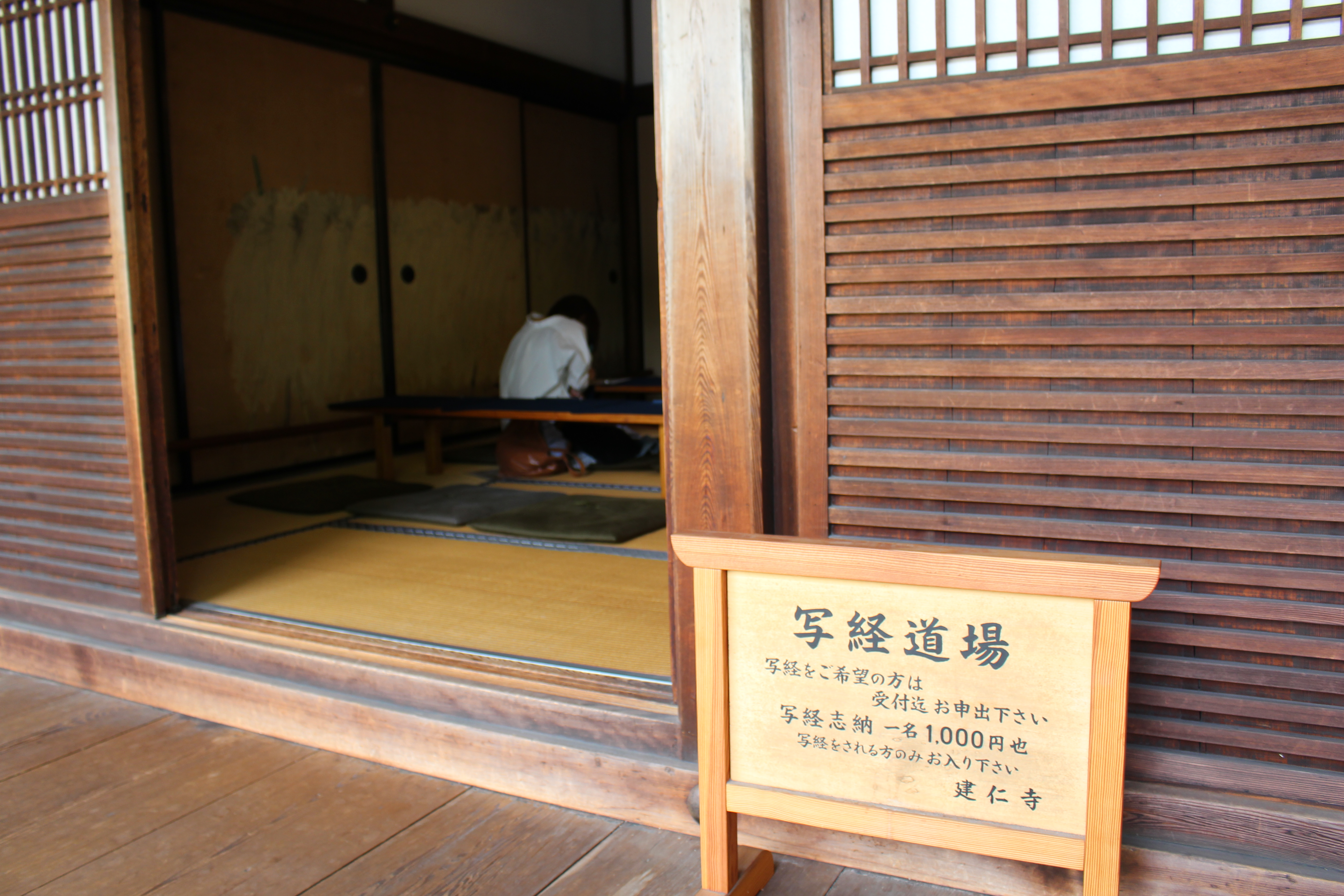
A sutra copying dojo, 写経道場 (shakyō dōjō).

Sutra copying is considered to generate merit, a kind of spiritual goodness which grows with each positive act one performs. Mahayana sutras contain many passages which discuss how copying and disseminating them (known as "upholding the sutras") will create merit and other positive benefits, such as providing spiritual protection and increasing one's wisdom.

Other meritorious practices included the memorization and recitation of sutras.

Sutra copying is also considered an expression of Buddhist faith. It can be understood as a devotional practice, a meditation practice and practice that develops wisdom, since it comprises worship, concentration, calligraphy and scriptural study.

According to the Chinese Buddhist monk Sheng Yen, sutra copying has two main benefits: it improves one's memory of the teachings and it gives rise to a mind of respect and faith since "Seeing the Sutra is like seeing the Dharma; seeing the Dharma is like seeing the Buddha". As such, the practice can be understood as a type of Buddhist meditation, since it can calm and purify the mind and also give rise to focus and concentration.

Since early in history, it was also common for people to support and sponsor scribes and monastics to copy Buddhist sutras. Thus, even those who did not have the time or skill to copy sutras could indirectly cultivate merit by supporting sutra copying endeavors.

== Styles and methods ==
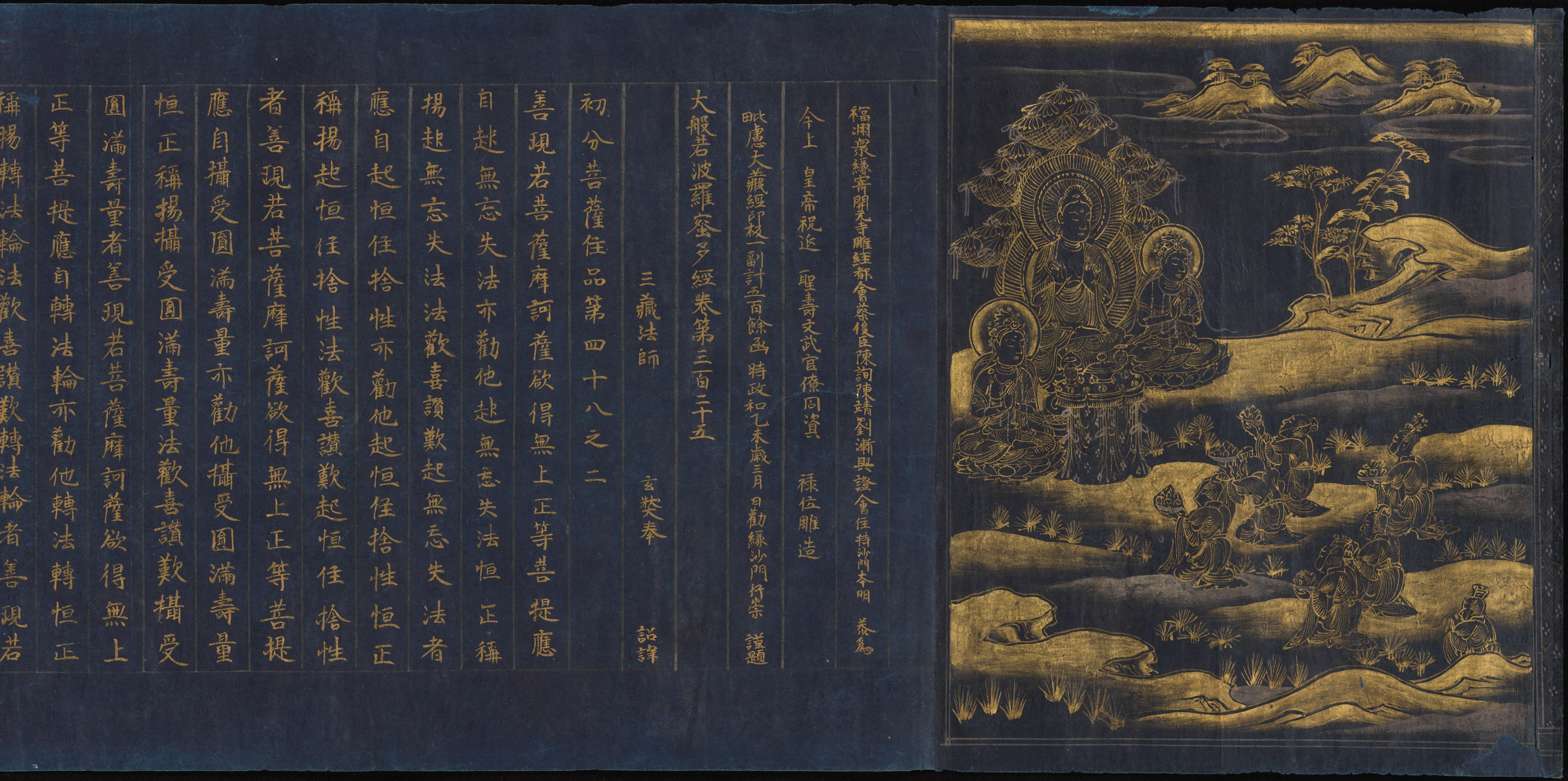
Great Wisdom Sutra from the Chūson-ji Sutra Collection

The styles, and instruments used for sutra copying vary significantly. They range from expensive and highly decorative forms and manuscripts to simple mass-produced sutra copying books which remain popular with Buddhist laypersons in Asia today.

Many decorative sutra manuscripts are renowned for their artistic beauty. These works of art were meticulously crafted using a variety of materials, techniques, and styles, making them both sacred texts and cultural treasures. The materials used in these manuscripts varied widely, depending on the purpose of the text and the resources available. Paper, often made from mulberry or hemp fibers, was the most common medium due to its durability and fine texture. Indigo-dyed paper, popular during the Tang and Song dynasties in China and later in Korea and Japan, created a striking contrast when paired with gold or silver ink. Other luxurious materials included gold- and silver-flecked paper, which was often reserved for high-status manuscripts, and silk or brocade paper, which added an opulent touch to temple or royal commissions. Inks also ranged from the practical, such as traditional black ink made from soot and animal glue, to those made with powdered gold or silver suspended in lacquer, or even ink mixed with the blood of devout practitioners as an act of profound piety.

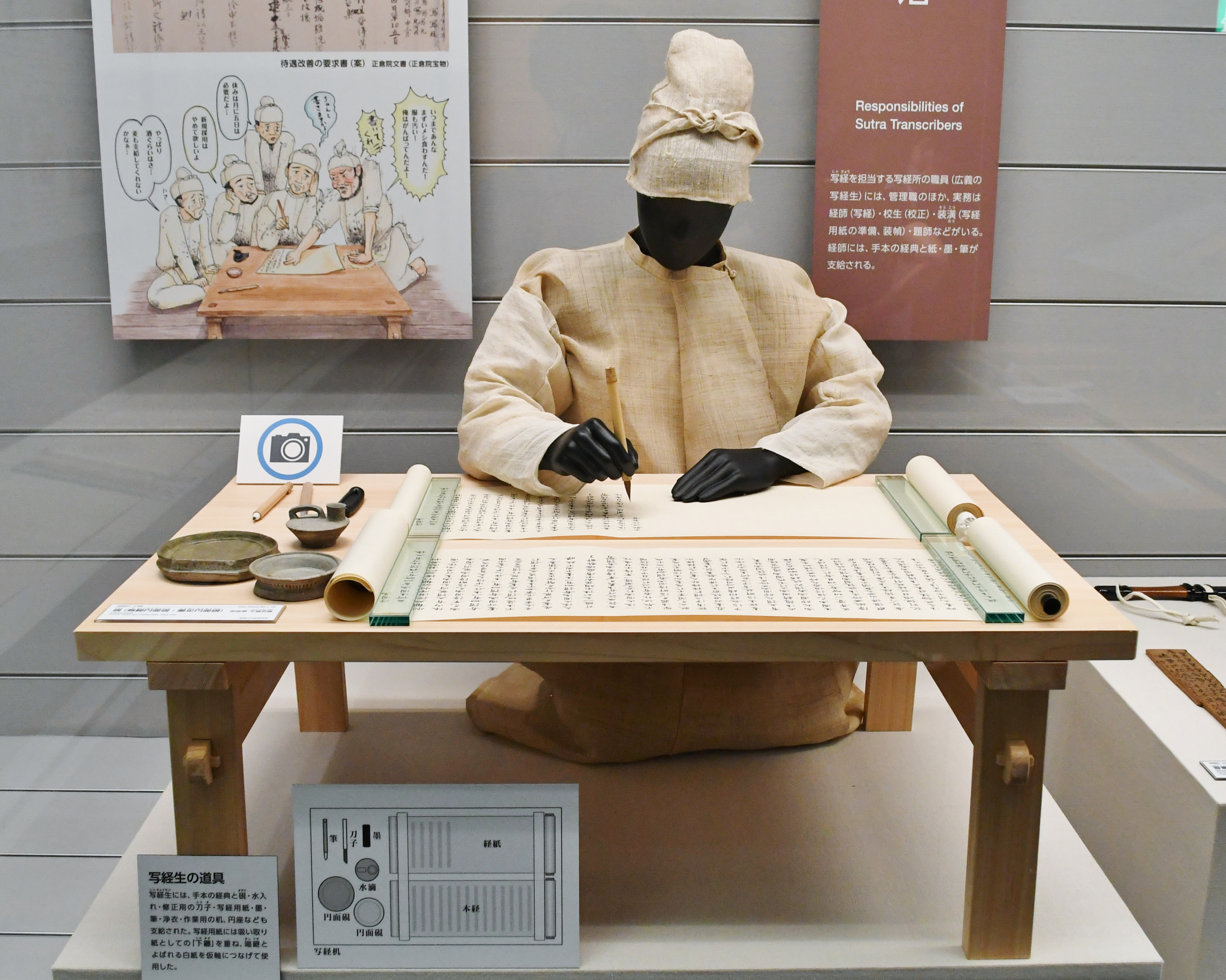
Shakyō Practitioner (Exhibit at the National Museum of Japanese History)

Chinese sutras frequently employed kaishu (regular script) for its clarity and formality, while xingshu (cursive or running script) allowed for a more fluid personal styles. In Japan, the sōsho (cursive script) style became prominent during the Heian period, reflecting the era's emphasis on artistic elegance.

The methods of copying sutras ranged from individual devotional efforts to large-scale scriptorium projects in monastic settings. Monastic scriptoriums were highly organized, with teams of scribes often collaborating to produce complete collections of texts. Devout lay practitioners and monks also engaged in personal copying as an act of merit-making, viewing the physical act of transcription as a form of meditation or as a devotional offering. Tools used in these efforts included fine brushes made from animal hair, inkstones for grinding ink sticks, and rulers or templates to ensure precise alignment. In some cases, decorative elements, such as lotus flower motifs or miniature paintings of Buddhist deities, adorned the manuscripts, adding to their visual and symbolic significance.

== History ==
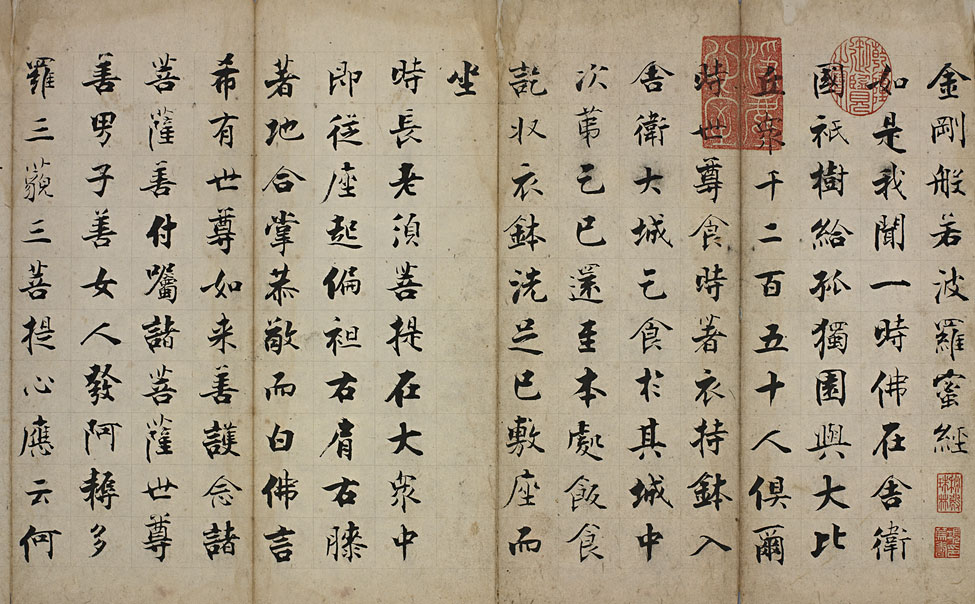
A section of the Diamond Sutra, handwritten by Zhang Jizhi on 18 July 1253 during the Song dynasty

The practice of sutra copying using Chinese characters originated in China, arising out of the process of the translation of Indian Buddhist scriptures into Chinese. Sutra copying began to develop during the Six Dynasties period (220–589), flourishing during the Sui and Tang dynasties. The process of translating the Indian Buddhist texts into Chinese by translators like Lokakṣema (c. 164–186 CE) and Kumārajīva (334–413 CE) took centuries. These figures worked with teams of translators and scribes, who were the first "sutra copyists" (抄經). Their work was copied for centuries afterwards and disseminated throughout the libraries and Buddhist monasteries of China. Sutra copying was imported to Korea in the third century.

According to John Stevens:

As soon as translations appeared the virtue of sutra copying as a devotional practice was recognized—sutra copying combined worship, literature, and calligraphy. Beginning with Emperor Daowu in 386, a long line of rulers issued imperial commands for special copying of all available sutras, and several copied portions themselves. All of the eminent monks of the period encouraged their followers to write out the sutras on which their teaching was based. For example, Zhikai (538–597), founder of the Tiantai school, instructed his disciples to copy the Lotus Sutra while Shandao (613–681), first patriarch of the Pure Land sect, made more than ten thousand copies of the Sukhavativyuha Sutra (Amidakyo). Sutras were engraved on the sides of mountains, inside cave temples, and on large sutra pillars that were erected at crossroads. Copies were made in gold and silver ink on the finest paper, enclosed in lacquer boxes, and stored in special buildings.

In Japan, the tradition is said to have begun in 673 (the second year of Emperor Tenmu’s reign) when the copying of the entire Buddhist canon was carried out at Kawaradera. During the Nara period (710–794), specifically in the Tenpyō era, Emperor Shōmu revered Buddhism and sought to propagate it, leading to an unprecedented flourishing of the religion. Consequently, sutra copying became a popular activity. Professional copyists (写経生, "shakyō-sei") were employed, and sutra copying became a state-sponsored enterprise. During the Heian Period (794~1192) sutra copying was also practiced privately by individuals as a spiritual practice.

== Printing sutra ==
The printing of sutras is called "kangyou"(Japanese: 刊経, romanized: kangyou) in Japanese, in contrast with copying out sutras through handwriting.

Woodblock printing of sutras called "kangyou" was widespread by the Song dynasty China. It also became very important in Korean Buddhism, which produced the Tripitaka Koreana, one of the most well preserved woodblock printed editions of the Buddhist canon. A printing sutra, the Hyakumantō Darani, was published in Nara period Japan. A scripting sutra is sometimes copied from the printing sutra.
