= Black tooth country =

Former country in Japan

Black tooth country (黒歯国, Kokushikoku, Original Chinese: 黑齒國) is an ancient Chinese legendary country of black-toothed people thought to be far to the east. It is described together with Shujukoku, and the Land of the Naked.

== Summary ==
The following is reported in a Chinese book. Many researchers believe it to be a real country, since it is mentioned in the so-called Wajinden of the Records of the Three Kingdoms as being located far southeast of Wakoku. In Korea, there is a theory that Heukchi Sangji is related.

Some researchers believe that the country may be related to Indonesia, and as a basis for their argument, they believe that in Indonesia, betel chewing (called kimmah in Japan), which is made from betel nut and lime, and it is said that they sometimes talk while emitting reddish-black juice, which is also indicated by the route and geography of the waterways described in the "Records of the Three Kingdoms".

== Huainanzi ==
In Huainanzi, it is described as follows.

- All black teeth are black.
- His teeth shall be black, and he shall eat rice and devour snakes. It is above the valley of Yutani.
- East arrives at Blacktooth.

== Classic of Mountains and Seas ==
In Classic of Mountains and Seas, it is described as follows.

- To the north of it is the Land of Black Teeth. The people there are black. They eat rice and eat snakes. North of Black Tooth lies Fusang.
- There is a land of black teeth. He is a descendant of Emperor Shun. He has the surname Jiang. He eats prosoil and uses four birds.

In The Tale of Genji, Suetsumuhana it is said「Ohaguro The mountain and the sea are the land of black teeth in the East China Sea, where women have black dyed teeth.

== Wen Xuan ==
In "The Selected Writings", it is described as follows.

- The fishermen in the boats are at their leisure in the eastern extremity of the south, in the land of the black teeth.

== The Annals of the Three Kingdoms ==
In "Records of the Three Kingdoms", it is described as follows.

- There are two countries, the Naked Country and the Black Tooth Country. It takes about a year to reach there by ship to the southeast.

== Book of the Later Han ==
It is described in the Book of the Later Han as such

- It takes one year to reach the Black Tooth Country by ship southeast from the dwarf country 4000-odd ri south of Queen Country.

== Book of Liang ==
In the Book of Liang the country is described as such

- "To the south is the Land of the Little People, and to its south is the Land of the Black Tooth. It is 4,000-odd ri from Japan. It takes one year to reach there by ship.

== See also ==
- Teeth blackening - widely practiced custom in Southeast Asia and Oceania
- Ohaguro
- Fusang
