= Chōnen =

Fujiwara no Chōnen (25 February 938 – 25 April 1016) was a Japanese Buddhist monk and traveller.

== Early life ==
The son of Fujiwara no Masatsura, Chōnen was born in the erstwhile capital of Japan, Kyoto. He trained as a monk at Tōdai-ji. While there, he studied the three scriptures brought to Japan by the Korean monk Ekwan in 625, the sanron-shū, under Kanri, a monk of Tônan-in (one of the many shrines that comprised the Todai-ji). He also studied Esoteric Buddhism under Gengo, a monk of the Ishiyama-dera monastery.

== Travels in China ==
Gold was given to him by both the Kyoto court and by the retired Emperor Uda in order to fund a visit to China. His original purpose was both to study at the temples on Mount Wutai and to make a pilgrimage following the Buddha's footsteps. In 983, Chōnen departed Japan upon the ship of the Chinese merchants Xu Renman and Chen Renshuang, accompanied by his disciples, Ka'in and Jōsan. They visited various Buddhist sites in and around Yue Prefecture (Zhejiang), Hangzhou, and Yangzhou, most notably the Kaiyuan Temple (Chaozhou). At the Kaiyuan Temple, Chōnen had hoped to view an image of Śākyamuni, carved from sandalwood at the order of the ruler of Udayana, that was believed to represent the true form of the Buddha. However, the image had been moved to Kaifeng.

Chōnen arrived at the court in Kaifeng in 984. Chōnen was there warmly received by Emperor Taizong of Song; Chōnen gave the emperor several books, including his genealogy of the Japanese imperial family and a copy of the Taihō Codes. Taizong asked Chōnen many questions about Japan, eager to learn, and expressed admiration for the stability of the Japanese imperial dynasty. Taizong then granted him purple robes and a printed copy of the entirety of the Buddhist tripitaka, commissioned by Taizong himself and only completed the year before. While in Kaifeng, Chōnen also saw the image of Śākyamuni, and ordered a copy made by the sculptors Zhang Yanjiao and Zhang Yanxi. He then travelled to Mount Wutai, before returning to Japan on the ship of Zheng Rende in 986. His return was a momentous event: the image of the Buddha was paraded through Kyoto and crowds gathered to see the five thousand volumes of the tripitaka offloaded in five hundred chests. It is believed that he wrote a journal of his experience in China, though it is not extant.

== Later life ==
Chōnen sent Ka'in back to Kaifeng in 988 to give Taizong Japanese fine art in gratitude for his gifts. The following year, Chōnen became the 51st abbot of the Tōdai-ji and in 1015 he founded the Seiryō-ji. The construction had been delayed due to hostility from the Enryaku-ji. He died before it could be completed - his aforementioned disciple, Jōsan, finished the construction.

== Bibliography ==
- Zhulinsi, Dasheng. "Mañjuśrī in Motion: Multi- Cultural, Cross - Religious Characteristics And International Impact of the Wutai Cult". Academia.
- Seiichi, Iwao; Sakamato, Taro; Hogetsu, Keigo; Yoshikawa, Itsuji; Kobayashi, Tadashi; Kanazawa, Shizue (1975). "Chōnen (938-1016)". Dictionnaire Historique du Japon. 3 (3): 90–91.
