= Monarch: The Big Bear of Tallac =

TV series based on the novel Monarch

シートン動物記 くまの子ジャッキー (Seton Doubutsuki: Kuma no Ko Jacky)
- Genre: Adventure, historical, western
- Created by: Ernest Thompson Seton
- Anime television series
- Directed by: Yoshio Kuroda
- Produced by: Akira Negi
- Written by: Michio Sato; Ryuzo Nakanishi; Yukiko Takayama
- Music by: Akihiro Komori
- Studio: Nippon Animation
- Original network: ANN (ABC)
- Original run: June 7, 1977 – December 6, 1977
- Episodes: 26

Monarch: The Big Bear of Tallac (シートン動物記 くまの子ジャッキー, Seton Doubutsuki: Kuma no Ko Jakki; loosely: "Seton Animal Chronicles: Jacky the Bear Boy") is a Japanese anime television series consisting of 26 episodes, based on the novel Monarch, The Big Bear of Tallac by Ernest Thompson Seton. It was directed by Yoshio Kuroda and was first broadcast on Asahi Broadcasting Corporation in 1977. It has been broadcast on TV in the Arab world, Finland, France, Germany, Hispanic America, Iran, Italy, the Philippines, Poland, Portugal, Spain, South Korea, Taiwan, and Ukraine.

== Plot ==
One day a Native American boy named Ran meets two little bears at the foot of the Sierra Nevada, where he lives with his father. Ran names the brother bear 'Jackie' and the sister bear 'Gill'. As Ran plays with the two bears, they become good friends, but Ran's father later accidentally shoots the two little bears' mother, killing her. Feeling sorry for them, Ran decides to take Jackie and Gill back home to live with him.
