= Seiryō-ji =

Buddhist temple in Ukyō-ku, Kyoto, Japan

Coordinates: 35°1′24.57″N 135°40′27.44″E

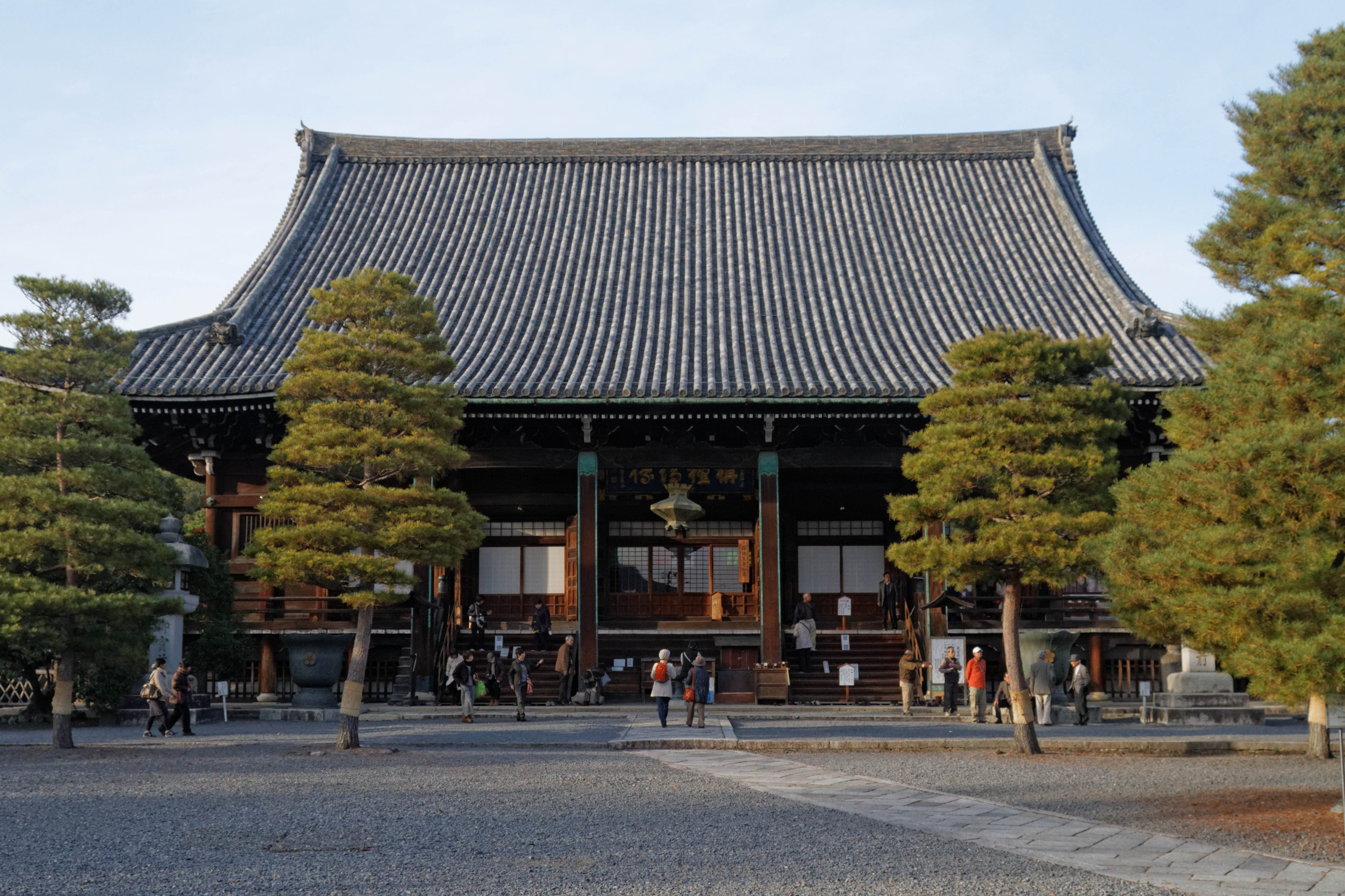
Front view

Seiryō-ji (清凉寺) is a Buddhist temple in the Saga district of Ukyō-ku, Kyoto, Japan. It is also known as Saga Shaka-dō. It used to be devoted to the practice of Yuzu Nembutsu, although it has been owned by the Jōdo-shū sect since the Genroku Period. The temple was founded in 1015 by Chōnen. Initially, the temple belonged to the Kegon sect; then it became a Pure Land temple. The honzon is an image of Gautama Buddha (Shaka-nyorai). The wooden statue is a National Treasure of Japan, and is an example of a hibutsu. Seiryō-ji also possesses National Treasure statues of the Amitābha (Amida) trinity, and other National Treasures and Important Cultural Properties.

The tomb of Minamoto no Tōru, sometimes mentioned as the model for Hikaru Genji in important Japanese literary classic The Tale of Genji, resides here.

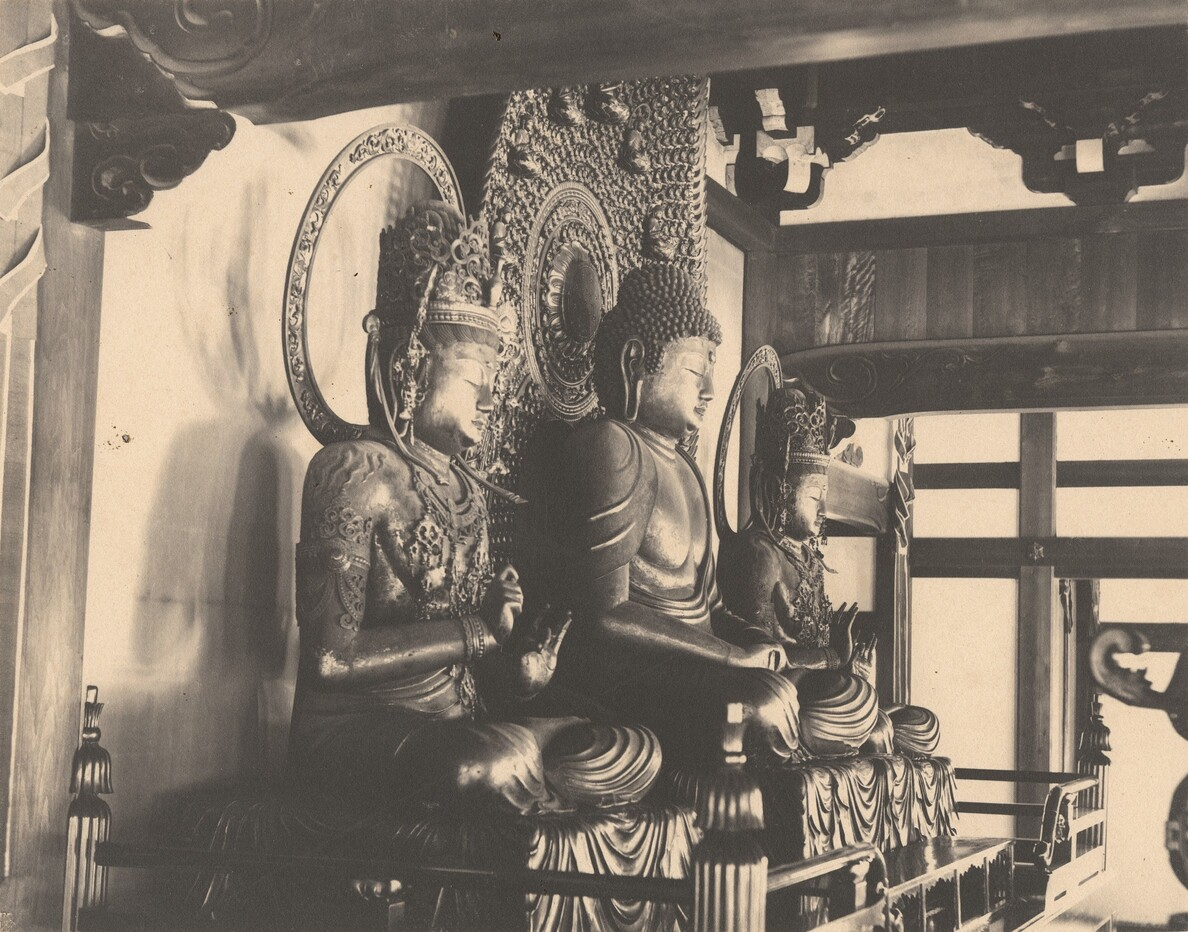
Amida Triad

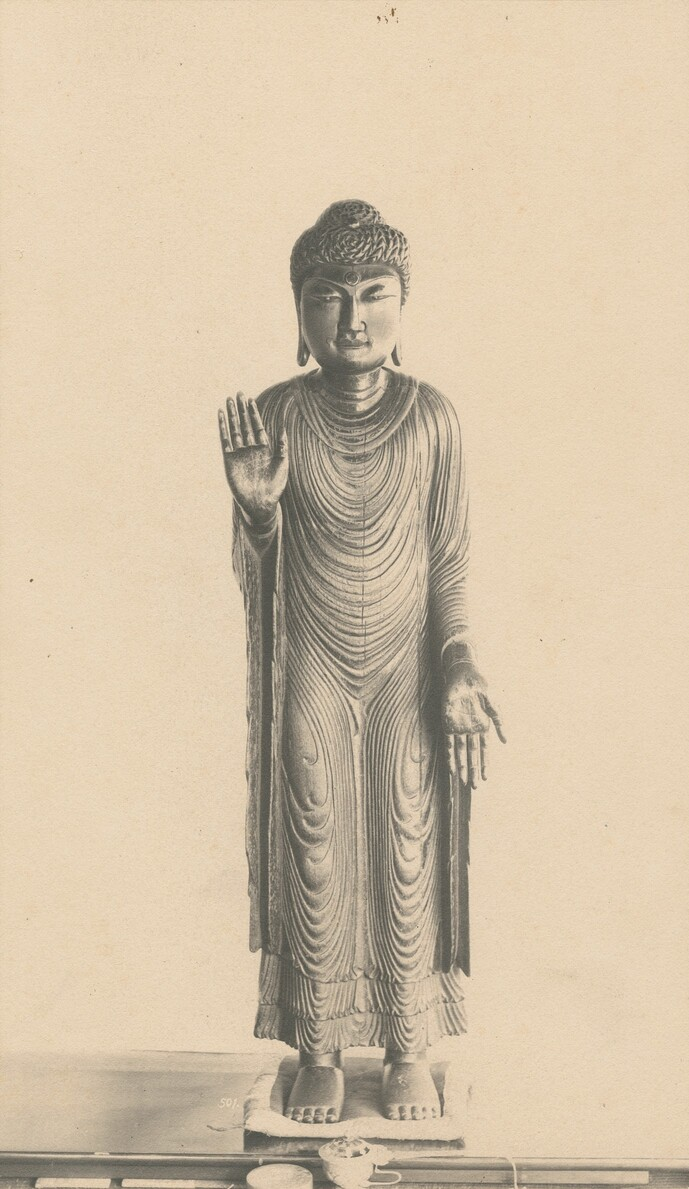
Shaka Nyorai

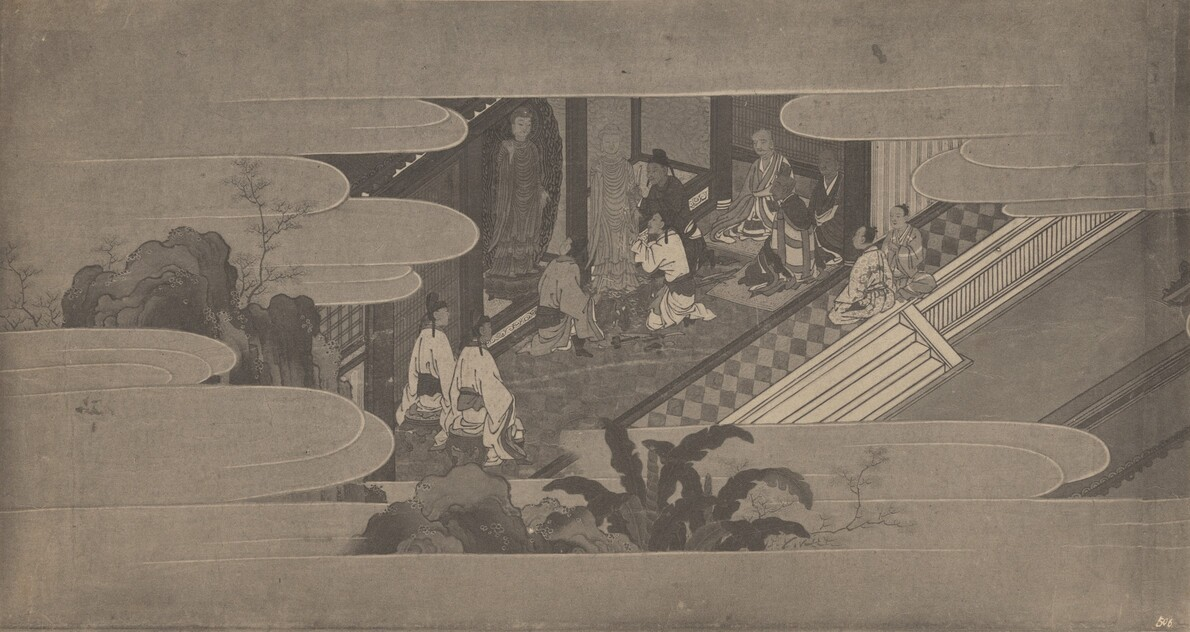
Painting depicting the carving of the Seiryo-ji Buddha

== See also ==
- List of National Treasures of Japan (paintings)
- List of National Treasures of Japan (sculptures)
- Thirteen Buddhist Sites of Kyoto
