= Batsu Hare =

Japanese manga series

- First tankōbon volume cover

バツハレ
- Genre: Romantic comedy
- Manga
- Written by: Minori Inaba
- Published by: Shueisha
- Imprint: Young Jump Comics
- Magazine: Weekly Young Jump
- Original run: March 10, 2022 – present
- Volumes: 13

Batsu Hare (バツハレ) is a Japanese manga series written and illustrated by Minori Inaba. It began serialization in Shueisha's seinen manga magazine Weekly Young Jump in March 2022.

The title is a word play on the words batsu (バツ), slang for "divorced," and hare (ハレ) that can mean "to clear up" or "special/festive". An approximate translation would be "A bright new life after divorce."

== Plot ==
Ichiro Wakō, a 35-year-old salaryman, is left heartbroken and alone after his wife, Menka, cheated on him. His marriage had been sexually troubled since he disappointed her on their wedding night, leaving him with chronic erectile dysfunction. Now, unable to move on from the wife who betrayed him, he simply spends his days grieving.

His routine is shattered when Kurumi Shibuya, a 24-year-old colleague at his company, introduces herself as Menka's younger sister and promptly confesses her feelings for him.

Ichiro is captivated by Kurumi's gentle nature—a stark contrast to Menka's cruel and manipulative personality. His long-lost sexual vitality even seems to be on the verge of returning—yet, it vanishes the moment he looks at Kurumi's face, a mirror image of Menka's. Pained by his struggle, Kurumi dedicates herself to helping him navigate their dating life, striving to restore his ability to engage in a healthy romantic and physical relationship.

== Publication ==
Written and illustrated by Minori Inaba, Batsu Hare began serialization in Shueisha's seinen manga magazine Weekly Young Jump on March 10, 2022. A spin-off chapter was released in the supplement magazine Young Jump Daiichiwa on April 27, 2023. Its chapters have been compiled into thirteen tankōbon volumes as of September 2026.

No.	Release date	ISBN
1	July 19, 2022	978-4-08-892374-1
2	November 17, 2022	978-4-08-892489-2
3	March 17, 2023	978-4-08-892627-8
4	August 18, 2023	978-4-08-892789-3
5	February 19, 2024	978-4-08-893117-3
6	June 19, 2024	978-4-08-893263-7
7	October 18, 2024	978-4-08-893412-9
8	January 17, 2025	978-4-08-893492-1
9	May 19, 2025	978-4-08-893587-4
10	September 19, 2025	978-4-08-893803-5
11	December 18, 2025	978-4-08-894030-4
12	May 19, 2026	978-4-08-894128-8
13	September 17, 2026	978-4-08-894342-8

== See also ==
- Minamoto-kun Monogatari, another manga series by the same author
