= Shujukoku =

Historical country in Japan

Shujukoku (侏儒国, しゅじゅこく) is a country of dwarves thought to be located south of Yamataikoku, which appears in Ancient China's Book of the Later Han and Records of the Three Kingdoms in Wei Zhi. It is mentioned together with Black tooth country and the Land of the Naked in the Classic of Mountains and Seas.

== Overview ==
The following are listed in Chinese history books. Book of the Later Han and the so-called Wajin Biography in Records of the Three Kingdoms state that it is located 4,000 miles south of the queen state of Wa-koku.

The Shanhai Jing, a document that precedes the Wajinden, mentions an island called Shojin-koku in the eastern sea. The same book also mentions other dwarfs such as "(焦僥)", "(周饒)", and "(菌人)" living in the east and south. The words "(焦僥)" and "(周饒)" have the same pronunciation and etymology as (侏儒), which is originally the same word.

== Wajinden ==
According to the Wajinden

There is also a dwarf country in the south of it, the people are three or four feet long, to the queen more than 4,000 miles.

== Book of the Later Han ==
According to the Book of the Later Han

More than 4,000 miles south of the Queen's country to Zhu Ru country, people are three or four feet long. From Zhu Ru southeast ship for a year, to the naked country, the black tooth country, so that the post transmission, the extreme is here.

== Main comparative sites ==
=== Tanegashima ===
Many have identified Tanegashima with Shujukoku.。This is the result of a study of human bones excavated from Tanegashima Island from the Yayoi period to the Kofun period, with "extreme" short head, short head, and short stature characteristics and that it is consistent with the anthropological characteristics of Shujukoku described in the wajinden. This feature is not found in Okinawa, Kyushu, or Honshu, where human remains from the same period have been discovered, and "dwarf-like" adult human remains are found only on Tanegashima Island.This is the reason why Tanegashima Island is located in the south of Kyushu. Tanegashima is located about 4,000 ri south of northern Kyushu, which is about 4,000 ri in the shortest sense of the word, so some Yamatai Kyushu Theorists have compared the country to Tanegashima.。

== See also ==
- Shojin
- Sukunabikona、Issun-bōshi
- Korpokkur
