= Hoshi no Ko Chobin =

Japanese anime television series

星の子チョビン
- Genre: Science fiction, comedy
- Anime television series
- Directed by: Rintaro
- Studio: Studio Zero
- Original network: TBS
- Original run: 5 April 1974 – 27 September 1974
- Episodes: 26
- Manga
- Written by: Shotaro Ishinomori
- Published by: Kodansha
- Magazine: Weekly Shōjo Friend
- Original run: April 20, 1974 – November 5, 1974
- Volumes: 1

Hoshi no Ko Chobin (星の子チョビン; lit. Chobin the Star Child) is a Japanese anime television series consisting of 26 episodes. It was created by Shotaro Ishinomori and directed by Rintaro. The anime series produced by Studio Zero was broadcast on TBS between 5 April and 27 September 1974. A manga version by Ishinomori was serialized in Kodansha's Weekly Shōjo Friend magazine from April 20, 1974 (Issue 14) to November 5, 1974 (Issue 27).

== Plot ==
A starbuddie from 4000 years ago coming from Japan an old man looked the star. the egg of the star falls to the Floor around him the creature is called "Chobin" his girl looked now his mother died in Galactic empire coming in the Earth.
