= Minamoto no Tōru =

Japanese poet and statesman

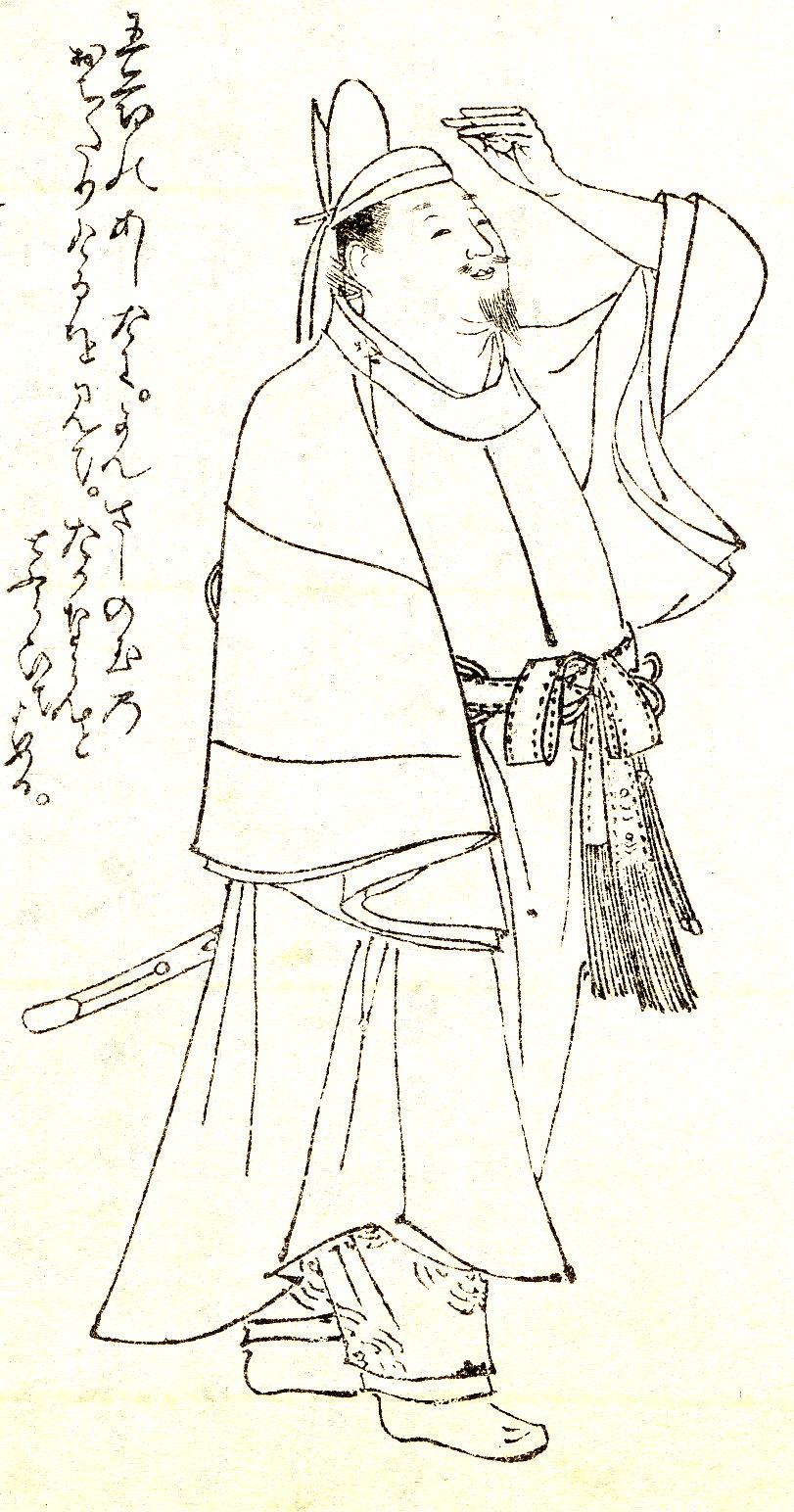
Minamoto no Tōru, by Kikuchi Yōsai

Minamoto no Tōru (源融; 822 – September 21, 895) was a Japanese poet and statesman. He was born the son of Emperor Saga and a member of the Saga Genji clan. He is sometimes mentioned as the model for Hikaru Genji in important Japanese literary classic The Tale of Genji.

Under his title Minister of the Left of Kawara (河原左大臣, Kawara no Sadaijin), he is the author of poem 14 in the Hyakunin Isshu poetry anthology:

陸奥のしのぶもぢずり誰ゆゑに
乱れそめにしわれならなくに
Michinoku no shinobu-mojizuri tare yue ni
midare somenishi ware naranaku ni
Like Michinoku prints of the tangled leaves of ferns, it is because of you,
that I have become confused; but my love for you remains.
(based on Kokin Wakashū 14:724)

Here is another translation:

The dye with hare’s-foot-fern, of Michinoku—who else would have made me feel as disturbed?

The poet is also famous for making a replica of the uta-makura Shiogama, a poetic place name, in his garden.

His tomb resides at the Seiryō-ji, a Buddhist temple situated on what was once Saga Moor in Kyoto.

Two of his poems are included in the Gosen Wakashū.
