= Suetsumuhana =

Historic Japanese word for the safflower

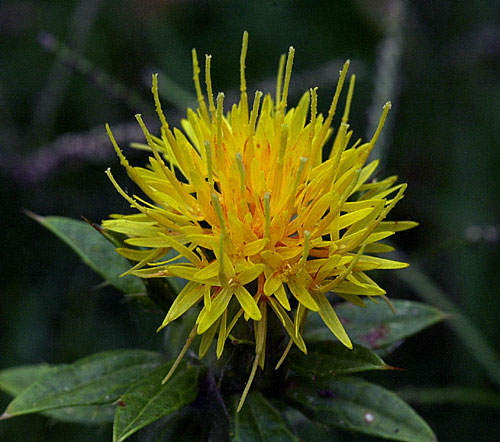
The suetsumuhana (safflower)

Suetsumuhana (末摘花) is the archaic Japanese word for the safflower. It is known now as Benibana (紅花).

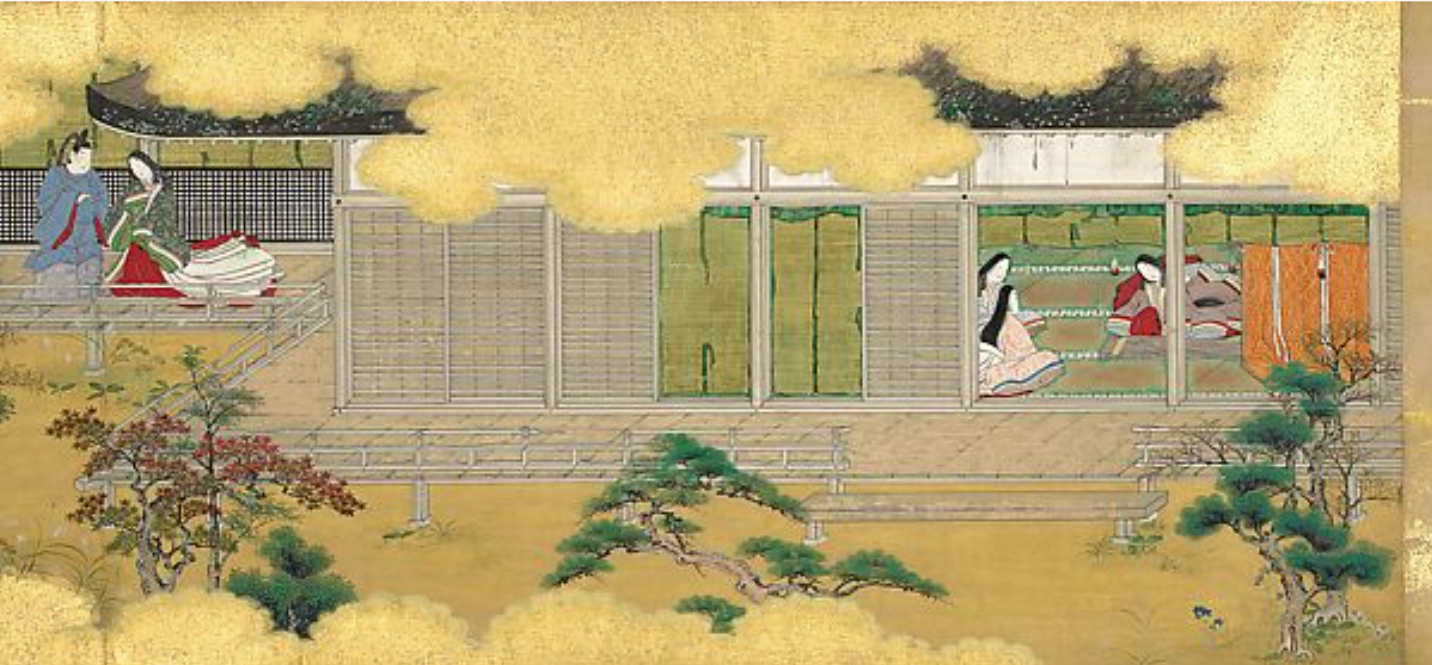
Chapter 5 – Suetsumuhana (末摘花, "The Safflower"). Kyō-Kano School.

== Character in The Tale Of Genji ==
Suetsumuhana is the name of a female character in Murasaki Shikibu's epic novel The Tale of Genji. The sixth chapter of it is named after her. She is also known as the Safflower Princess. In some English translations she appears as Princess Hitachi. Prince Genji was briefly attracted to her, until she lowered her fan to reveal her nose. However, he eventually felt sorry for her and helped support her. She is noted to be one of the most loyal ladies in the Tale of Genji, pining and waiting for Genji till he reciprocates her love. This is in part due to her unending loyalty to him, and that he is her first, and possibly, last man. She is invited to the palace, known also as the "Palace in the Sixth Ward", that Genji has built for all his women, and is taken care of for the rest of her life.

The incident with the Safflower Princess's nose has always been a source of comic relief for readers of the "Tale of Genji". In the manga comics, the extremely shy princess is always depicted as being quite unattractive, the amorous prince having fallen in love because of her voice and the way she plays the koto. The arrangements of her jūnihitoe robes were, however, described as fitting those of an older lady. (She was hidden in the beginning behind the sudare screen, however, as part of the courtly Heian rituals, the 12-layered sleeves were allowed to peek from under the screen. Based on the colour-arrangements, the suitor could see what kind of taste and status his lady had.)

Modern scholars, however, speculate that Suetsumuhana's nose, which was described in the "Genji" as being red and that of an elephant, probably resembles today's European noses. The ideal of female beauty in Heian was to have very fine, thin noses, as depicted in the painted scrolls. Anything that fell outside this courtly beauty ideal was likely to have been seen as obscene.

== See also ==
- The Tale of Genji
- Heian Period
