= Lady Fujitsubo =

Fictional character from The Tale of Genji

- The Tale of Genji character
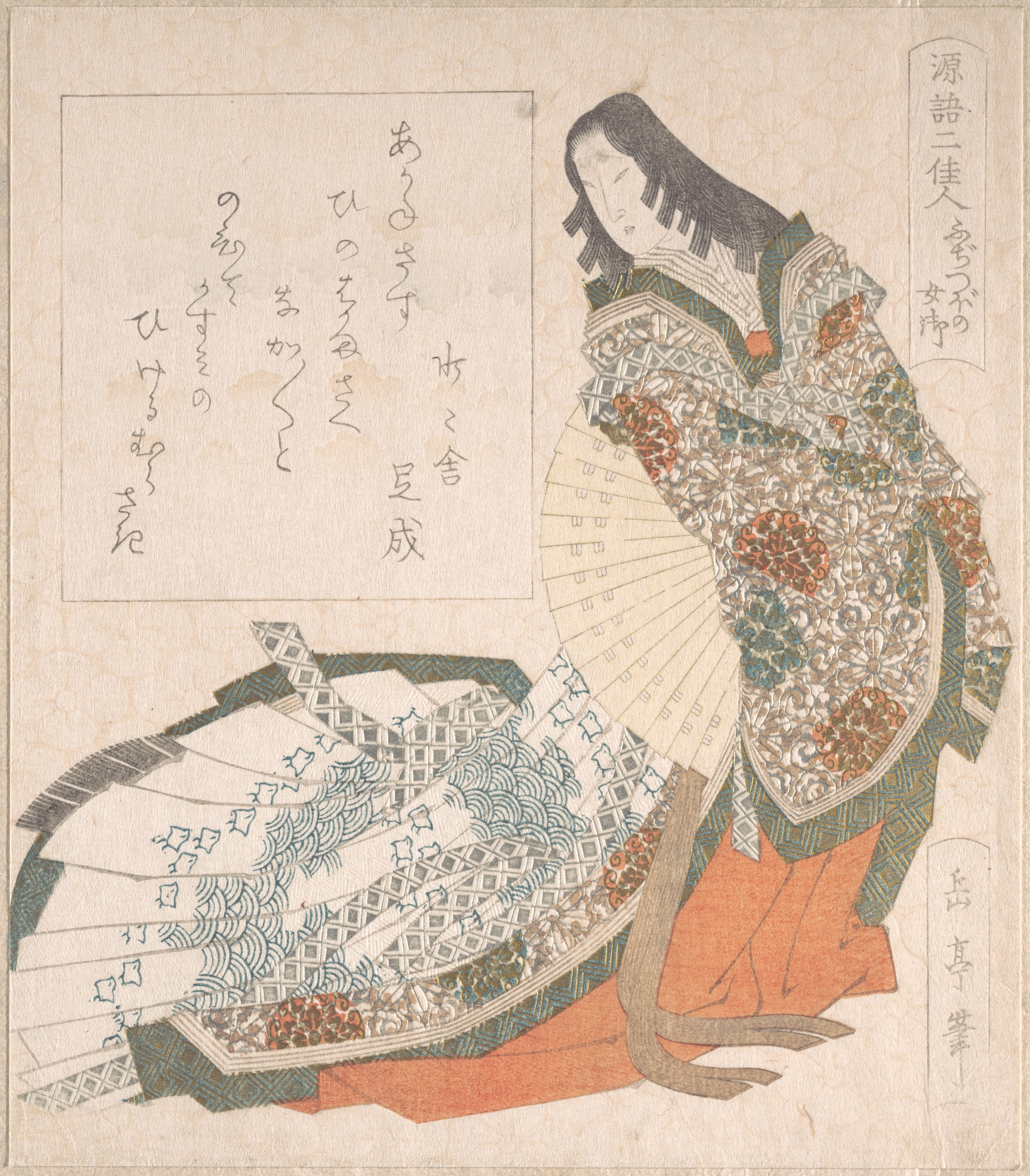
- Princess Fujitsubo in Court Costume with a Fan, a surimono print by Yashima Gakutei

In-universe information
- Spouse: Emperor Kiritsubo
- Significant other: Hikaru Genji (stepson)
- Children: Emperor Reizei

Lady Fujitsubo (藤壺) is a fictional character in Murasaki Shikibu's The Tale of Genji (Genji Monogatari).

== Biography ==
Daughter of a previous emperor and thus imperial princess, Fujitsubo enters the service of Kiritsubo Emperor at age 16, mainly because of her resemblance to the deceased Kiritsubo Consort. She soon becomes an imperial favorite, but also Genji's childhood crush and later lifelong obsession. By chapter seven, "Momiji no ga," it becomes obvious that Fujitsubo and Genji are already involved in an illicit love affair (although the author does not describe it, but rather implies the beginning of the relationship), the result of which is the birth of Reizei (the future emperor) whom everyone, except the two lovers, believes to be the son of the Kiritsubo Emperor.

Elevated to the rank of Empress and having her son named Heir Apparent (Reizei is supposed to succeed Suzaku), Fujitsubo gradually grows more and more troubled by guilt and the fear of having her secret exposed. Once Genji's advances intensify and, in the public realm, the faction of the Kokiden Lady comes to power, Fujitsubo's only countermeasure is to take vows and become a nun ("Sakaki"). By this, she hopes on the one hand to permanently put Genji off and eliminate the risk of their affair being discovered and, on the other hand, to reassure Kokiden that she renounces any secular, political claims to power. After Genji's return from exile, she forms a political alliance with him and turns into a genuine "politically ambitious" figure in the tale. Only on her deathbed (in "Usugumo") does she return to being a romantic heroine.

== Reception and analysis ==
Fujitsubo's importance in the tale lies beyond her immediate contribution to the plot, in what Norma Field termed as being an "original substitute": she makes her debut as a substitute for Kiritsubo, yet Genji will later look for substitutes for Fujitsubo in women such as Utsusemi, the Third Princess, and especially Murasaki no Ue.

The adulterous affair between Fujitsubo and Genji is paralleled in Sagoromo monogatari, written c. 1070 – c. 1080 by Rokujō no Saiin Senji, in which the protagonist Sagoromo secretly violates a princess who gives birth to a son. In order to save the princess's reputation, the empress presents the child to the emperor as the empress's own. Later, when the emperor tries to abdicate in favour of this prince, an oracle identifies the prince's real father as Sagoromo and requires the emperor to cede him the throne instead.

The author of Mumyōzōshi disapproved of the manner in which Genji ultimately becomes honorary retired emperor through his illicit tryst with Fujitsubo, and found the similar plot device in Sagoromo monogatari "utterly revolting and appalling." Several later readers of The Tale of Genji also found Genji and Fujitsubo's affair problematic. Jun'ichirō Tanizaki's first translation of Genji, produced in the 1930s with the supervision of the ultranationalist Yoshio Yamada, cut out the affair between Genji and Fujitsubo entirely so as to avoid offending Imperial Japan's State Shinto ideology of an unbroken divine imperial lineage. This material was restored in Tanizaki's later translations published after the end of World War II.
