= Murasaki no Ue =

Fictional character from The Tale of Genji

- The Tale of Genji character
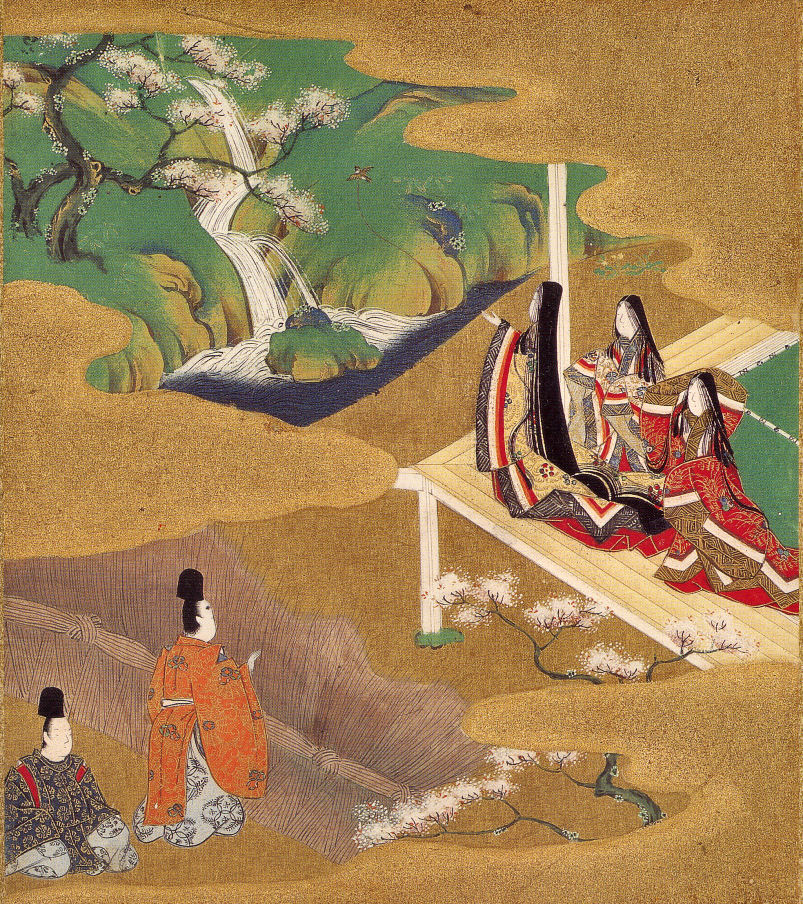
- Chapter 5 – Wakamurasaki (若紫, "Young Murasaki"). Tosa Mitsuoki, 1617–91.
- Created by: Murasaki Shikibu

In-universe information
- Significant other: Hikaru Genji
- Relatives: Lady Fujitsubo (Aunt)

Murasaki no Ue (紫の上), also spelled Murasaki-no-Ue, is the main heroine of The Tale of Genji. She is also known as "Lady Murasaki" in some translations. She first appears in the fifth chapter, when she is a young girl. Prince Genji first encounters her in a village in Kitayama and becomes enamored with her, especially after learning that she is the niece of his stepmother, Lady Fujitsubo, whom he is enamored with and carries on an affair with. When Murasaki's grandmother, a nun, and her great-uncle, the abbot, refuse to give him permission to adopt her, and dismiss his proposals as unserious, Genji decides to abduct Murasaki no Ue and raise her at his palace, taking advantage of the nun’s death unbeknownst to the girl’s father. He grooms her into becoming similar to Fujitsubo, who embodies the feminine standards that he desires. Murasaki's relationship with Genji remains consistent through the novel, even when her heart is broken on multiple occasions when Genji participates in affairs with other women.

Like most characters in Genji, Murasaki no Ue is never given a name. This stems from Heian-era manners, which deems referring to people by their personal names as rude. The true name of the author, Murasaki Shikibu, has never been discovered as a result of this convention. The author was named after Murasaki's sobriquet, and the name Shikibu comes from the title Shikibu-shō, a title for a person who had a position in the Ministry of Ceremonial Affairs. The author would have had a male relative who held a position as a Shikibu-sho, and, because it was common to refer to women as the titles that their male relatives had, thus it would have become the name she would be commonly referred to.

== Name ==
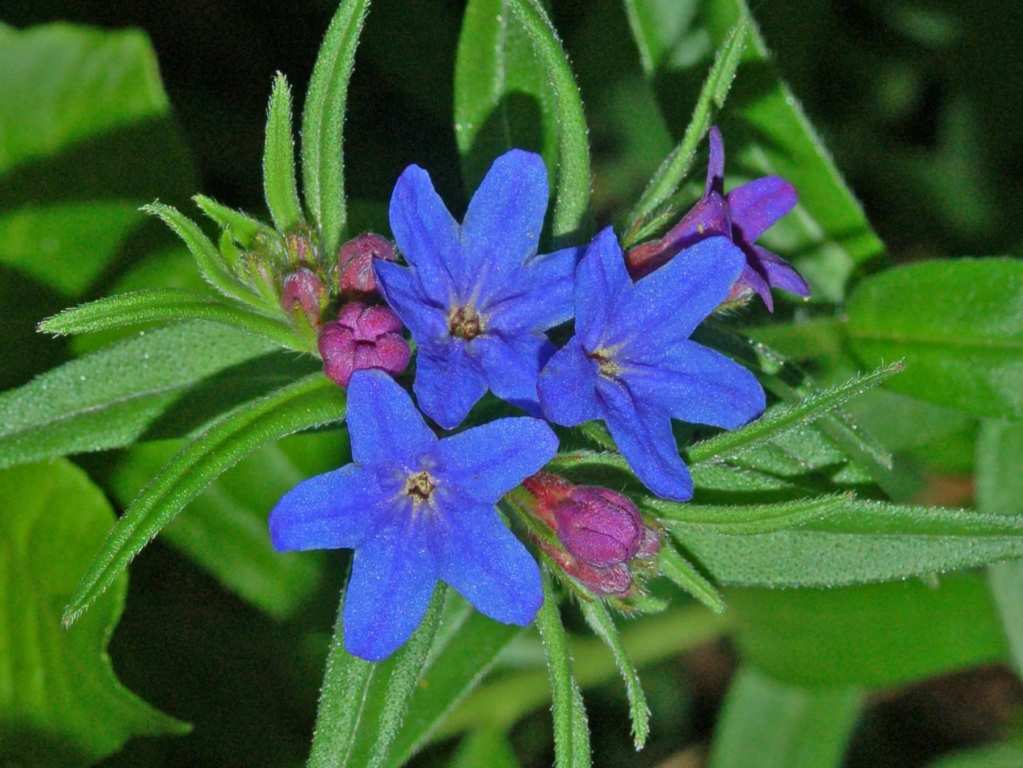
Close-up on purple-reddish blooms and blue flowers of the Murasaki flower or purple gromwell

Murasaki no Ue's name remains a pseudonym, as due to court manners of the author's time (the Heian period, 794–1185), it was considered unacceptably familiar and vulgar to freely address people by either their personal or family names; within the novel, the character herself, too, is unnamed, as most of the book's characters are never identified by any name, but by their rank and title (in the case of male persons), the rank and title of their male relatives (in the case of female persons), or after the name of their habitation (in the case of the great court ladies). As such, the Genji character Murasaki is often referred to as the "Lady of the West Wing". In most commentaries and translations, she is simply referred to as "Murasaki" for ease of identification and to improve readability.

== A Word Game, or, a Famous Color in Literature ==
The name Murasaki is inspired by a poem that the novel's hero, Genji, improvises when contemplating his first meeting with the novel's heroine, then a little girl who will grow up to be "Murasaki":

How glad I would be to pick and soon to make mine that little wild plant sprung up from the very root shared by the murasaki.

Murasaki (紫) is the Japanese word for the color purple. Other translations include lavender, as used by Edward Seidensticker in his English version of Genji; violet; and violet root, which in Japanese poetry denotes love and constancy.

Genji, in his poem, names the murasaki or purple gromwell, because its color resembles the color of wisteria (in Japanese, fuji) thereby obliquely referring to Fujitsubo, "the Lady of the Wisteria Court", a woman he is violently in love with for the first part of the novel. This lady Fujitsubo is little Murasaki's aunt. Thus, in a word association game very characteristic of Japanese poetry, the similarity between the two colors – the deep purple of the violet, and the light purple of wisteria – led to the name Murasaki, a well-known name in Japanese literature.

(It is a further twist to this word game, that the novel's Murasaki, the Lady of the West Wing, though certainly turning into a shining example of love and constancy, ends her life in pious resignation, with a jealous demon appearing at her bedside - thereby destroying Genji (the hero).)
