= Kiritsubo Consort =

Character from The Tale of Genji

- The Tale of Genji character

In-universe information
- Significant other: Emperor Kiritsubo
- Relatives: Hikaru Genji (son)

Kiritsubo Consort (桐壺更衣, Kiritsubo no Kōi) is a fictional character in The Tale of Genji (Genji Monogatari). She is the mother of Genji. The Emperor favored her over all his other ladies, despite her relatively lower rank. He would stay with her longer than was generally considered "proper" and with the court's concern for propriety it was quite scandalous. The other ladies began to harass her and she began to waste away. She died three years after Genji's birth. After her death, Genji constantly sought to fill the void left by this loss by forming relationships with various women, many of whom resembled his mother.

== Background and Status ==
She was the only daughter of the late Counselor Dainagon and Lady Kita, and before entering the imperial court, she was placed in the service of Emperor Kiritsubo’s harem, where she received his deep favor. At that time, the position of Empress had not yet been filled, and many women in the court—including Kōkiden no Nyōgo, who had been the first to bear the emperor’s eldest son—competed for his affection. Lacking powerful backing, Lady Kiritsubo was given the inconvenient and distant quarters of Shukkeisō (Kiritsubo) within the court. Following her father’s will, her mother, Lady Kita, worked tirelessly to secure her daughter’s position, carrying with her the hope of restoring their family’s fortunes. She had one elder brother who had become a monk (“Kashiwagi”).

Although she was not born into particularly high status, she enjoyed the exclusive favor of Emperor Kiritsubo, which provoked jealousy from other Nyōgo and Kōi. These women, along with the influential nobles who supported them, compared her to figures like Yang Guifei and subjected her to both overt and subtle harassment. The stress took a toll on her health. She gave birth to the emperor’s second son (Hikaru Genji), but in the summer when Genji was three years old (Heian-era summers correspond to roughly April–June), her illness suddenly worsened, and she died shortly after returning to her family home. The emperor, regretting that she never achieved the rank of Empress, posthumously conferred upon her the Third Rank (Jusanmi).
