= Hikaru Genji =

Protagonist in "The Tale of Genji"

- The Tale of Genji character
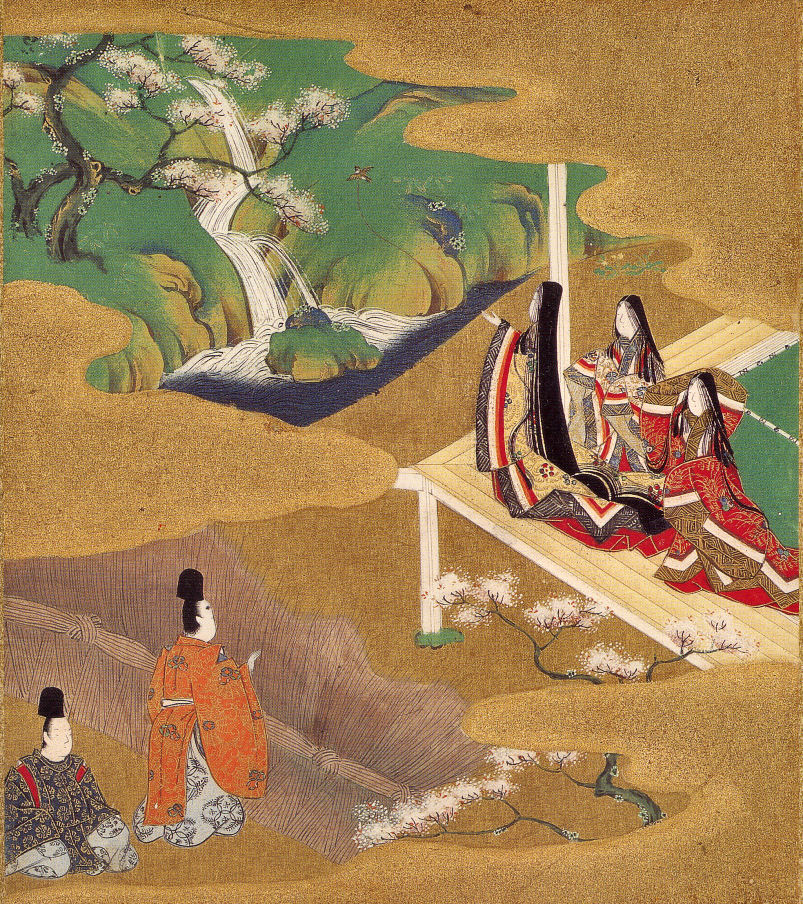
- A depiction of Genji's visit to Kitayama, where he first sees Murasaki no Ue and falls in love with her.
- Created by: Murasaki Shikibu
- Based on: Minamoto no Tōru (disputed)

In-universe information
- Nickname: Genji
- Gender: Male
- Title: Shining Prince
- Family: Minamoto
- Spouses: Aoi no Ue, the Third Princess
- Children: Emperor Reizei; Yūgiri; Princess Akashi
- Relatives: Emperor Kiritsubo (father); Kiritsubo Consort (mother); Lady Fujitsubo (stepmother); Emperor Suzaku (half-brother)

Hikaru Genji (光源氏) is the protagonist of Murasaki Shikibu's Heian-era Japanese novel The Tale of Genji. "Hikaru" means "shining", deriving from his appearance, hence he is known as the "Shining Prince." He is portrayed as a superbly handsome man and a genius. Genji is the second son of a Japanese emperor, but he is relegated to civilian life for political reasons and lives as an imperial officer.

The first part of the story concentrates on his romantic life, and in the second, on his and others' internal agony. He appears from the first volume "Kiritsubo" to the 40th volume "Illusion".

"Genji" is the surname of a noble demoted from royalty. His given name is never referred to in the story, as is the case with most other characters. He is also referred to as Rokujō no In (六条院), sometimes abbreviated as In (院). He is often called Genji.

Hikaru Genji was attractive and talented, easily gaining the favor of those around him at a young age. Describing his superlative qualities, Murasaki Shikibu wrote: "but to recount all his virtues would, I fear, give rise to a suspicion that I distort the truth." His appearance tempted men and women alike, as he had smooth white skin and excellent fashion sense, which increased his fame and popularity.

The character of Hikaru Genji has had several adaptations in other media, from different iterations of The Tale of Genji. He is depicted as possessing unrivaled beauty and charisma in all subsequent media adaptations.

While fictitious, Genji is thought to be inspired by historical figures, including Minamoto no Tōru, who was a grandson of Emperor Saga, hence one of the Saga Genji clan.

== Life of Hikaru Genji in Tale of Genji ==
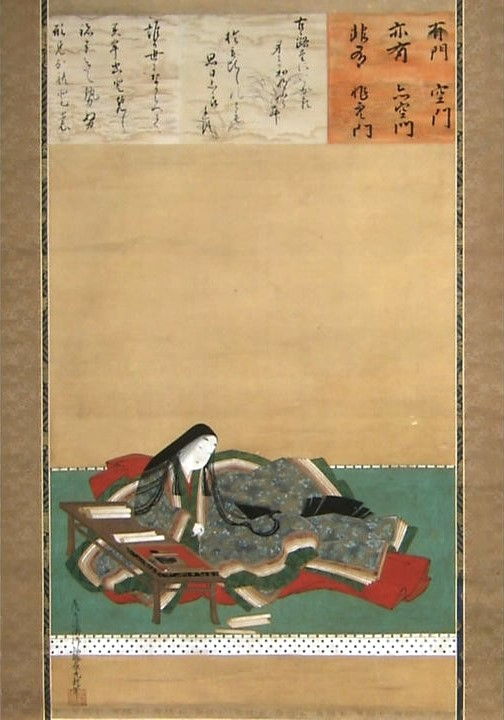
Portrait of Murasaki Shikibu, the author of The Tale of Genji.

The ages of characters are counted in kazoedoshi (数え年), as the story discusses.

It is common to divide the tale into three parts, and this article follows that custom, but the division is not made explicit in the original version of the story written by Lady Murasaki.

=== Part one ===
Hikaru Genji was born the second son of Emperor Kiritsubo (桐壺帝) by his lower ranked consort, Kiritsubo no Koi (桐壺更衣). Genji had peerless beauty and genius, even from infancy, and was nicknamed "the Shining Prince". His mother died when he was only three years old. The pursuit of the feminine ideal represented by his deceased mother is an important element that drives many of his subsequent romantic pursuits.

His father Emperor Kiritsubo considered appointing Hikaru the crown prince. He was however worried that his second son had no support from his maternal line. After being further discouraged by a fortuneteller's prediction that the country would be thrown into chaos if Hikaru ascended to the throne, the Emperor lowered Hikaru's rank to civilian, giving him the clan name Minamoto (Genji).

Utsusemi, the wife of the Iyo Deputy and stepmother of the Governor of Kii, is memorable as the first woman Genji courts in the tale and also, arguably, as the first to resist him. Frustrated because he cannot reach Utsusemi, Genji beds little Kogimi, Utsusemi's younger brother, for Genji "found the boy more attractive than his chilly sister," as a replacement for her. This episode constitutes the only open reference to homosexuality in the tale.

Genji adored his stepmother Lady Fujitsubo (藤壺), a later favorite consort of Emperor Kiritsubo, because of her close resemblance to the dead Lady Kiritsubo, and that similarity was also the reason that Emperor Kiritsubo had her enter his court. As a result of Fujitsubo and Genji's forbidden love, she bore a boy, later Emperor Reizei (冷泉帝), to Genji when he is 19, but almost no one knew the truth of his birth, and the child was raised as a prince and son of Emperor Kiritsubo.

He had two wives in the legal sense during his life; he married Lady Aoi (Aoi no Ue､葵の上) in his youth, and much later Onna san no Miya (女三の宮) (meaning "The Third Princess", called so in Japanese, and known as Nyōsan in the Arthur Waley translation.) Lady Aoi died after she bore a son to Genji. But Genji's de facto wife and most beloved one was Lady Murasaki, Murasaki no Ue (紫の上), a niece of Fujitsubo. Genji met her by chance when she was very young - at the age of 10, and when he was 18 years old. When her grandmother who brought her up died, and before her real father could take her to his mansion, Genji kidnapped Murasaki and brought her up himself. After Aoi died, Genji made her his unofficial wife. Although their marriage didn't follow the whole protocol of official marriage, she received as many honours as the factual wife of Genji. But she officially remained his concubine, and that was one of the reasons Genji was offered the opportunity to marry the Third Princess in the second part of the story. Genji couldn't reject this offer because of his affection for Fujitsubo, but Onna san no miya was so young that she turned out to be too naïve, and he was very disappointed and had many regrets.

Genji had many love affairs. He even had sex with one of his brother's de facto consorts Oborozukiyo (朧月夜). She was nominally the Head of Ladies-in-waiting and no official consort, but it was a scandal, and gave a pretext to political opponents. Genji moved to Suma, in Harima Province, before he could be expelled officially.

In Harima province, Genji met Lady Akashi and had a daughter by her. Later his brother Emperor Suzaku was afflicted by illness and feared it was a result of the wrath of his late father's spirit, by his poor treatment of his brother, Genji. Genji was invited to return to Miyako (nowadays Kyoto). He left Lady Akashi and the child, and returned to Kyoto.

After Genji was back in Kyoto, Emperor Suzaku abdicated in favor of the crown prince (Reizei) who was really the son of Genji and Fujitsubo. This prince ascended to the throne, but he learned the secret of his birth by chance, and wanted to abdicate in favor of his real father, Genji. It was however impossible and as the second best, Emperor Reizei later gave Genji nearly the same rank as an abdicated emperor. After rising to this noblest rank, Genji was called Rokujo-in (六条院), a name taken from his mansion.

Genji wanted his daughter to be the next Empress. He invited Lady Akashi and the child (known as Princess Akashi, 明石の姫君) to Kyoto. Later, Lady Murasaki adopted this girl and raised her. This girl later became a consort of the crown prince and eventually his empress.

=== Part two ===
At the age of forty, he married his niece Onna san no Miya, who was a daughter of his elder half-brother Emperor Suzaku (朱雀帝), and her mother was a lady whose half-sister was Empress Fujitsubo, hence another niece. This marriage did not make him happy. Kashiwagi (柏木), a friend of his son Yugiri (夕霧(ゆうぎり)), hence a nephew of Lady Aoi, lusted after Onna san no Miya and sought her love even after her marriage with Genji. Finally he intruded into Rokujoin and raped her. She bore a boy whose father was Kashiwagi. Genji later discovered the secret and became angry, but finally realized it was just what he had done to his father, and it was a punishment for his past treachery to his father and emperor. He decided to keep the secret of the birth of this boy and to bring him up as his real and third child.

After Lady Murasaki died, he became a monk and secreted himself in Saga (嵯峨(さが)).
