= 深夜食堂 =

深夜食堂 may refer to:

- Shin'ya Shokudō, Japanese manga series written and illustrated by Yarō Abe
- Late Night Restaurant (심야식당), South Korean drama series
- Midnight Diner (Chinese TV series), Chinese television series
- Midnight Diner (Japanese TV series), Japanese television series
