= List of Midnight Diner episodes =

Midnight Diner is a Japanese anthology TV series directed by Joji Matsuoka, based on the manga series Shin'ya Shokudō by Yarō Abe. The show was produced by MBS for its initial three season run from 2009 to 2014 before being acquired by Netflix Japan in 2016. Netflix would go on to produce and distribute the fourth, fifth, and sixth seasons of the show (released outside Japan as Midnight Diner: Tokyo Stories) with the fourth season premiering on October 21, 2016, the fifth season on October 31, 2019, and the sixth season on October 20, 2026.

== Summary ==
When people finish their day and hurry home, my day starts. My diner is open from midnight to seven in the morning. They call it "Midnight Diner". That's all I have on my menu. But I make whatever customers request as long as I have the ingredients for it. That's my policy. Do I even have customers? More than you would expect.

Midnight Diner takes place inside a small izakaya with only "Meshiya" (the equivalent of an American diner's "EATS") as signage in Shinjuku, Tokyo. The restaurant's opening hours are from 12:00 am to 7:00 am, and is a popular destination for the diverse nightlife of Shinjuku. Each episode begins with the character known only as "Master" preparing his signature tonjiru and narrating his nightly routine. Master always offers to produce any dish that a customer may want, providing he has the ingredients on hand and is not something overly complicated. He refers to this as his "dining policy".

The diner is frequented by a varied group of customers, ranging from salarymen, to Yakuza, and prostitutes. Each episode deals with a story focused on a particular customer as well as a particular Japanese dish, often the favorite meal of the character that the episode is about. Each episode ends with Master giving a brief demonstration of how to prepare the dish while a character from the episode gives verbal instructions directly to the audience. While the characters are largely transitional, and are mainly seen in their own self-contained episodes, some are often seen in the background as minor characters or cameos in one or two other episodes. Several characters are regular customers of the diner and reappear regularly.

== Episodes ==
The following is a list of episodes for the series Midnight Diner, which began airing in Japan on October 9, 2009. The series has also released two feature films in Japanese theaters: ''Midnight Diner'' (2014) on January 31, 2015 and ''Midnight Diner 2'' (2016) on November 5, 2016.

=== Season 1 ===
No. overall	No. in season	Title	Directed by	Written by	Original release date
1	1	"Akai wiener to tamagoyaki"	Joji Matsuoka	Yarô Abe & Katsuhiko Manabe	October 9, 2009
Ryu Kenzaki is a Yakuza boss who likes pan fried mini-wieners cut into the shape of an octopus. One night, while Kosuzu enjoys his rolled omelet, Ryu arrives at the diner and the two share their meals with the other. Through mutual respect and understanding, the two become friends; although Kosuzu would prefer a more romantic relationship. Featured dish: Tamagoyaki
2	2	"Neko manma"	Joji Matsuoka	Yarô Abe & Kôsuke Mukai	October 16, 2009
Unemployed enka singer Miyuki shares a bowl of dried fish flakes sprinkled over rice with Master in the early mornings. One day, her luck changes when she meets an accomplished lyricist at the diner. After listening to Miyuki perform, the lyricist writes her a song as a gift, but fate soon reveals other plans for her. Featured dish: Neko-Manma ("cat rice"), a dish of rice and fish, in this case, katsuobushi, which is often given to cats.
3	3	"Ochazuke"	Takurô Oikawa	Yarô Abe & Takurô Oikawa	October 23, 2009
Miki, Rumi, and Kana are three single, thirty-something best friends who frequent the diner for hot bowls of ochazuke and juicy gossip. After multiple nights of loudly voicing their opinions on true love, their seemingly unbreakable friendship verges on total collapse when one of them decides to go on a blind date in the hopes of escaping her unmarried status. Featured dish: Ochazuke
4	4	"Potato Salad"	Takurô Oikawa	Yarô Abe & Takurô Oikawa	October 30, 2009
A young man named Tanaka is determined to get his start in the pornography business, and convinces famous porn star Erect Oki to help him get his shot in front of the camera. But the emotional toll of the work might be more than Tanaka can handle, as Mr. Oki's own dark past comes back to haunt him. Featured dish: Potato salad
5	5	"Butter Rice"	Takuma Tosaka	Yarô Abe & Kiyohito Wada	November 6, 2009
Komichi brings as a guest a famous, yet arrogant, food critic named Mr. Toyama. His pompous attitude brings resentment from the regular patrons. A surprise visit by an elderly guitarist named Goro and his performance payment for a simple bowl of butter rice resurrects long-buried memories for Toyama. Featured dish: Butter rice
6	6	"Katsudon"	Joji Matsuoka	Yarô Abe & Katsuhiko Manabe	November 13, 2009
Katsutoshi Kawada (called "Kacchan" by the diner patrons) is an amateur boxer who comes to Master's diner to enjoy a bowl of katsudon after every win. One day, he falls in love with a widow named Akemi, and forms a strong bond with both her and her young daughter. Kacchan struggles to prove himself in the ring, endangering his hopes of becoming a professional boxer. Featured dish: Katsudon
7	7	"Tamago sando (Egg sandwich)"	Nobuhiro Yamashita	Yarô Abe & Katsuhiko Manabe	November 20, 2009
Nakajima is a poor but hard-working university student who juggles his education with working as a delivery boy for a newspaper agency. He falls in love with a rising Internet star named Lisa, who hopes to become a successful actress. She returns his feelings and in fact is the first one to confess, but Nakajima then has second thoughts, as he believes their lives are too wildly different. This gets in the way of their relationship, ultimately forcing the choice of staying together or splitting up. Featured dish: Egg sandwich
8	8	"Sauce yakisoba"	Takurô Oikawa	Yarô Abe & Takurô Oikawa	November 27, 2009
A woman named Rinko with a very distinct voice comes to the diner and asks for yakisoba with a fried egg on top. Two other patrons recognize her as an ex-idol, a former fame that continues to make Rinko's life difficult as she struggles to become an actress in serious dramas. Featured dish: Yakisoba
9	9	"Aji no hiraki"	Nobuhiro Yamashita	Yarô Abe & Kôsuke Mukai	December 4, 2009
Frustrated young stripper Marilyn connects with an older woman named Yachiyo. As their friendship blossoms, Marilyn is insulted by a former classmate who recognizes her at Master's diner. When Yachiyo comes to her rescue, she inadvertently reveals a secret about herself, one Kosuzu and Mr. Chu remember all too well. Featured dish: Grilled mackerel
10	10	"Ramen"	Joji Matsuoka	Yarô Abe & Katsuhiro Manabe	December 11, 2009
Still reeling from the attack on his "big brother" Ryu, Gen stabs the leader of a rival Yakuza gang and becomes a fugitive. Master attempts to bring Gen comfort, and advises the young Yakuza junior to take responsibility for his actions if he ever hopes to make Ryu proud. The other patrons come together to celebrate Christmas with Master in his diner. Featured dish: None (The episode features both ramen and grilled crab in major scenes but does not provide any cooking instructions to the audience.)

=== Season 2 ===
No. overall	No. in season	Title	Directed by	Written by	Original release date
11	1	"Futatabi akai weiner"	Joji Matsuoka	Yarô Abe & Katsuhiko Manabe	October 14, 2011
Yakuza boss Ryu enjoys his evenings eating mini-wieners at Master's diner. Detective Noguchi hears about a local diner in Shinjuku that serves Ryu and decides to investigate. He tracks down Ryu and his junior Gen at a batting cage where the police detectives arrest Gen. Noguchi informs Ryu that if he wants Gen to earn his freedom, the two will have to put their aside differences for the sake of an old friend in need of help. Featured dish: None (The episode features mini-wieners in major scenes but does not provide any cooking instructions to the audience)
12	2	"Karaage to highball"	Nobuhiro Yamashita	Yarô Abe & Kôsuke Mukai	October 21, 2011
Newcomer Saya Adachi always orders fried chicken and a highball before dozing off. She works long hours at a pachinko parlor so she can financially support her boyfriend Shosuke, a struggling comedian. Master and Gen decide to intervene as Shosuke becomes increasingly abusive towards Saya. Featured dish: Japanese fried chicken
13	3	"Asari no sakamushi"	Shôtarô Kobayashi	Yarô Abe & Katsuhiko Manabe	October 28, 2011
Takeshi is a middle-aged martial arts instructor who constantly bickers with his elderly, alcoholic mother named Oren. Oren's alcoholism has prevented Takeshi from maturing as a man, something she blames on her son rather than on her own problems. Master's conversations with other characters reveal a tragic past to the mother-and-son relationship, which comes to a head after a serious car accident. Featured dish: Steamed clams
14	4	"Nikogori"	Fumio Nomoto	Yarô Abe & Kôsuke Mukai	November 4, 2011
Bento shop employee Shoji has a crush on Ikumi, who comes to the diner for Master's jellied fish broth over rice. On a particularly busy day, Ikumi helps Shoji with frustrated customers at his bento shop. As Shoji prepares to declare his love for Ikumi, Komichi reveals a surprising secret about Ikumi's real line of work. Featured dish: Jellied fish broth
15	5	"Kanzume"	Nobuhiro Yamashita	Yarô Abe, Haruhiko Arai, & Misa Arai	November 11, 2011
Genki and Yuki are aspiring filmmakers who wish to turn their screenplay about a suicidal woman into a feature film. They cast the mysterious Kikuno as the lead actress but she soon disappears. Both men, in love with Kikuno, fight over her affection when she suddenly reappears. Master talks to a mysterious patron at his diner, who tells stories involving gruesome murders and ghosts, much to Genki and Yuki's distress, and they begin to speculate whether Kikuno is a ghostly reincarnation of the subject of their screenplay. This is the first episode of Midnight Diner that features supernatural or magical realist elements. Featured dish: Tuna salad
16	6	"Creme stew"	Joji Matsuoka	Yarô Abe, Haruhiko Arai, & Misa Arai	November 18, 2011
Suzuki is a struggling novelist who fights with his editor and suffers from writer's block. He decides to hire Hana, an escort who frequents Master's diner, as a stress reliever, but is shocked to learn about her true identity. Featured dish: Cream stew
17	7	"Hakusaizuke"	Shôtarô Kobayashi	Yarô Abe & Kôsuke Mukai	November 25, 2011
Tsukiko is a famous TV screenwriter who comes into Master's diner for his pickled cabbage, which she claims is the best in all of Tokyo. One night, she shares her leftovers with a taxi driver named Takeshi, who also loves pickled cabbage. The two become friends after they learn they're from the same hometown. Tsukiko's affair with her TV producer is revealed to the press, sending her career into a downward spiral. Featured dish: Pickled cabbage
18	8	"Hiyashi chuuka"	Shôtarô Kobayashi	Yarô Abe & Kôsuke Mukai	December 2, 2011
Hitomi is a beautiful young woman who is unsuccessful in relationships with men her age. One night, she decides to pursue the company of an older man named Mr. Hashimoto. The two get along wonderfully and eat chilled noodles at Master's diner despite it being the middle of winter. One night, Detective Inuzuka stops by the diner looking for a wanted criminal. His only clue is "chilled noodles". Featured dish: Chilled noodles
19	9	"Nikujaga"	Joji Matsuoka	Yarô Abe & Katsuhiko Manabe	December 9, 2011
Kanemoto excitedly brings in his girlfriend Chiaki to taste Master's meat and potato stew. The stew brings back memories of her childhood for Chiaki, when her family was too poor to afford beef. Kanemoto plans to marry her but the proposal is cut short when other patrons recognize Chiaki as someone else. Featured dish: Meat and potato stew
20	10	"Gyōza"	Joji Matsuoka	Yarô Abe & Katsuhiko Manabe	December 16, 2011
One of the few dishes Master will not prepare is gyōza, which he prefers to specially order from a neighboring restaurant called Anamori Dumplings. The chef at Anamori, Murata, offers to teach Master how to make gyōza in exchange for a party at the diner. Murata's wife Momoko enters the diner with her husband and is immediately recognized by both Master and Katagiri as a customer from the early days of the diner. The three of them argue over their actions in the past, threatening to expose long-buried secrets to Murata and the other customers. Featured dish: None (The episode features both gyōza and grilled crab in major scenes but does not provide any cooking instructions to the audience.)

=== Season 3 ===
No. overall	No. in season	Title	Directed by	Written by	Original release date
21	1	"Menchikatsu"	Joji Matsuoka	Yarô Abe & Misaki Arai	October 20, 2014
Misao Kashima is a retired singer who gave up on her career after her husband's death. After mourning for eight years, she finds the courage to return to the diner and eat a favourite dish of her late husband: minced meat cutlets. Mr. Toyama, the food critic, asks her for help with his sick wife, leading Misao to look back on her life choices. Featured dish: Minced meat cutlets
22	2	"Butabara tomatomaki"	Kazuyoshi Kumakiri	Yarô Abe & Kensaku Kojima	October 27, 2014
Manga editor Uno brings his new manga artists to the diner to try the Master's recipe for cherry tomatoes wrapped in bacon. His most recent artist, Hashimoto, seems to be incapable of creating any significant work and goes into an identity crisis. This affects everyone around Hashimoto, including his exhausted girlfriend Noriko. Featured dish: Cherry tomatoes wrapped in bacon. In keeping with the manga theme of the episode, the end segment is presented as manga panels.
23	3	"Satoimo to ika no nimono"	Nobuhiro Yamashita	Yarô Abe & Kôsuke Mukai	November 3, 2014
Private investigator Kei Satomi has a new trainee named Mamoru who has doubts about his abilities. Kei devises a test after eating Master's squid and taro stew to prove to Mamoru he is ready. Mamoru's attempts to successfully pass his test lead to some unexpected places and more than one secret romance. Featured dish: Squid and taro stew
24	4	"Benishoga no tempura"	Joji Matsuoka	Yarô Abe & Katsuhiko Manabe	November 10, 2014
Komichi falls in love with Kasumi, an extremely confident and intrepid woman from Osaka who only orders pickled ginger. Kosuzu and the other customers find her tastes strange but Kasumi has a hidden agenda, one that Komichi continues to be oblivious to as he tries to win her heart. Featured dish: Pickled ginger tempura
25	5	"Harusame salad"	Fumio Nomoto	Yarô Abe & Kensaku Kojima	November 17, 2014
Miho and Sayuri plan their elementary school reunion while sharing a bowl of glass noodles at Master's diner. As part of the festivities, they unearth a time capsule that was buried 25 years ago by the students in the class. Sayuri finds letters she wrote about her true feelings for a fellow classmate named Shiga. After she confides in Miho, a love triangle emerges between the three friends. Featured dish: Glass noodle salad
26	6	"Roll kyabetsu"	Joji Matsuoka	Yarô Abe & Kôsuke Mukai	November 24, 2014
As the nights in Shinjuku get colder, Master prepares stuffed cabbage for the customers. Everyone is pleased, apart from Marilyn, who despises stuffed cabbage ever since she was a child. Soon after, Marilyn's mother Eri comes to Tokyo and immediately clashes with her daughter over her profession and her new boyfriend, Kimitoshi. Featured dish: Stuffed cabbage
27	7	"Shijimijiru"	Joji Matsuoka	Yarô Abe & Kôsuke Mukai	December 1, 2014
Happily married couple Yoshio and Mizue Hiraga visit Master every Saturday morning after finishing their morning walk through Shinjuku to enjoy a hot bowl of clam soup. After Mizue visits her hometown and runs into an old flame, she begins to have second thoughts about returning to Tokyo. At the same time, Yoshio develops feelings for Mariko Teshigawa, a Go player he sees on TV. Featured dish: Clam soup
28	8	"Kinpiragobou"	Nobuhiro Yamashita	Yarô Abe & Katsuhiko Manabe	December 8, 2014
After a night of rowdiness, Gen finds his old high school teacher Chizuru Ishikawa at Master's diner enjoying a serving of braised burdock root. The two spend the following weeks together, shopping around town and enjoying late nights at the diner and Kosuzu's bar. On her final night in Tokyo, Gen works up the courage to tell Chizuru how he really feels; Chizuru is unsure if she feels the same way. Featured dish: Braised burdock root
29	9	"Rebanira to nirareba"	Joji Matsuoka	Yarô Abe & Katsuhiko Manabe	December 15, 2014
Detective Noguchi disagrees with his new partner Detective Izumi. The two spend their evenings off work arguing in Master's diner about the correct way to be a police detective. After arresting a voyeur for stealing a woman's underwear, Noguchi and Izumi head to Master's diner, where Izumi has a surprise waiting for her partner. Featured dish: Liver and leek stir-fry
30	10	"Toshikoshi soba"	Joji Matsuoka	Yarô Abe & Katsuhiko Manabe	December 22, 2014
New Year's Eve arrives and Master diligently prepares his homemade soba noodles. However, Komichi, Hachiro, Kanemoto, Marilyn, Kimitoshe, and Mr. Chu all bring their own uncooked soba for him to prepare, much to his annoyance. He is saved by Detective Izumi, who asks him to prepare soba for herself, Detective Noguchi, and Officer Kogure, who will all be spending New Year's Eve at the neighborhood kōban. Kosuzu arrives with his drag queen friend Ko, shortly followed by The Ochazuke Sisters dressed in kimonos. Everyone in the diner enjoys Master's soba just as Ryu arrives with Gen. Clad with mochi-making equipment, the patrons make mochi outside while Master prepares mochi soup. The group toasts to the new year and continues to feast into the night. (Special Note: This is the first episode of the show that does not feature a character story or a plot. Instead, the events described above play out in sequence while the episode ends with a montage of major scenes from the season set to music.) Featured dish: None (The episode features the characters eating soba noodles and mochi soup but does not give instructions to the audience. Instead, the characters that appear in the episode announce the release of the upcoming movie Midnight Diner (2014) and tell the audience "We'll be waiting!")

=== Season 4 ===
(Released as "Midnight Diner: Tokyo Stories (Season 1)").

No. overall	No. in season	Title	Directed by	Written by	Original release date
31	1	"Tan-Men"	Joji Matsuoka	Yarô Abe & Katsuhiko Manabe	October 21, 2016
Master prepares tan-men for Mr. Shimada, a radio DJ. He prefers it over ramen because of its healthier ingredients. When he hears another customer, Harumi, order the same dish, he attempts to form a relationship with her. Harumi is put off by this, as Mr. Shimada's position as a radio DJ shines an unwanted spotlight on her personal life and muddled past. Featured dish: Tan-men
32	2	"Corn Dog"	Nobuhiro Yamashita	Yarô Abe & Kôsuke Mukai	October 21, 2016
Serao Kesara is among the last in a dying breed of comedians working in Asakusa. He is angry that his former pupil, Hajime, has eclipsed him in fame and become a sex symbol thanks to a successful TV career. Angry that the world has left him behind, Kesara harasses Hajime until their relationship crumbles, leaving Master to pick up the pieces. Featured dish: Corn dog & Battered fish sausage
33	3	"Tonteki"	Nobuhiro Yamashita	Yarô Abe & Kensaku Kojima	October 21, 2016
Shigemi is a naive, awkward, real estate agent who knits a sweater for every new crush she develops. The affection she feels is never returned, and she despairs over never finding true love. Her newest crush, Kirihara, blinds her from an opportunity at real happiness with a secret admirer who loves and appreciates her handiwork. Featured dish: Tonteki
34	4	"Omelette Rice"	Joji Matsuoka	Yarô Abe & Marina Oshima	October 21, 2016
After forgetting his umbrella during a rainstorm, physicist Amamiya arrives at Master's diner and orders omurice. Yoona, a young Korean hostess, connects with Amamiya after she unintentionally helps him with a difficult physics problem. Their mutual affection comes to a halt when Yoona's parents disapprove of her relationship and order her to move back to Seoul. (Special Note: This is the first episode of the show to feature a region outside Japan as a location for part of the story.) Featured dish: Omurice
35	5	"Egg Tofu"	Joji Matsuoka	Yarô Abe	October 21, 2016
Professional Mahjong gambler Mr. Ogami returns from Kyushu with his estranged son Taizo. The duo eat egg tofu over rice at Master's diner where they meet a young hostess named Midori. Tensions rise when Midori's boyfriend, Kazuma, challenges Mr. Ogami to a high-stakes game of Mahjong, overseen by the Yakuza. Featured dish: Egg tofu
36	6	"Umeboshi and Plum Wine"	Joji Matsuoka	Yarô Abe	October 21, 2016
Mr. Hoshino is the diabetic insomniac who owns the fresh produce store where Master shops. He is tormented by a recurring nightmare in which his deceased mother's ghost tries to break into his house in search of something. Kasumi enlists the help of Komichi, Mr. Chu, and Detective Noguchi to find what Hoshino's mother is searching for and make peace with her lingering spirit. Featured dish: Umeboshi
37	7	"Hot Pot for One"	Joji Matsuoka	Yarô Abe	October 21, 2016
Mr. Chu reunites with Okae, a childhood friend who left their hometown to become an actress. Decades after her career fails, Okae is forced to care for her deadbeat nephew, who begs for money and is constantly rude to her. Mr. Chu pleads with Okae to realize this is not what is best for her, ultimately leading to a nasty confrontation between old friends about their decisions in life. Featured dish: Japanese hot pot
38	8	"Sautéed Yam"	Joji Matsuoka	Yarô Abe	October 21, 2016
Drawn to Master's diner by their love of sautéed yam, Mr. and Mrs. Hisamatsu enjoy a night out celebrating 23 years of marriage. Later that week, Mrs. Hisamatsu seeks out Erect Oki, revealing herself to be his old adult film co-star Fujiko. Their romance is rekindled as Fujiko wrestles with what she knows is right and what she feels for Mr. Oki. Featured dish: Sautéed yam
39	9	"Ham Cutlet"	Joji Matsuoka	Yarô Abe	October 21, 2016
After working as an attorney for 35 years, Mr. Nakatsuka has one month left before he retires. A news story airs on TV about a man who refuses to vacate an apartment building set to be demolished to build a stadium for the 2020 Tokyo Olympics. Mr. Nakatsuka recognizes this man as his long-lost younger brother Kenta, who he used to challenge to games of Othello for the prize of ham cutlets. Featured dish: Ham cutlet
40	10	"New Year's Eve Noodles, Again"	Joji Matsuoka	Yarô Abe	October 21, 2016
As December comes to a close, Master and his patrons gather at the diner to relive memories of the past year. (Each story is shown as a flashback corresponding with a season of the year).: Spring: Komichi wins one million yen after successfully betting on a horse race. He throws a massive sushi party at the diner and brings in an outside chef, much to Master's chagrin.; Summer: During a power outage, Kanemoto tells a horror story about watermelons, causing Ryu to collapse in shock.; Autumn: Officer Kogure is accosted by a mute woman who tries to make him eat ramen noodles. It is implied by Detective Izumi and Kasumi that the woman has a crush on Kogure. He flees when he hears sirens in the distance.; Back in winter, the patrons enjoy Master's New Year's soba. As the clock strikes midnight, Gen and Ryu escort Michiru into the diner; she has brought osechi for everyone. After all the customers have left, Chieko arrives and helps Master clean up. She invites him attend hatsumōde (the first shrine visit of the new year) with her, but he turns her down. Saddened, Chieko wishes Master a happy new year and leaves. Realizing his mistake, Master chases after her but sees no sign of anyone outside. He returns to his diner as the first snow of the year begins to fall. Featured dish: None (The episode features soba and osechi in major scenes but does not provide any cooking instructions to the audience.)

=== Season 5 ===
(Released as "Midnight Diner: Tokyo Stories (Season 2)").

No. overall	No. in season	Title	Directed by	Written by	Original release date
41	1	"Chicken Fried Rice"	Joji Matsuoka	Yarô Abe	October 31, 2019
Akai is a video game designer who grew up in an orphanage. When his company's games fail to meet his standards, he goes to Master's diner and finds solace in a chicken rice dish he often ate as a child. Unbeknownst to Akai, the dish also holds the key to reconnecting with his birth mother. Featured dish: None (The episode features chicken rice in major scenes but does not provide any cooking instructions to the audience. The dish is created in a short montage with Master showing the preparation process.)
42	2	"Fried Chicken Breast with Cheese"	Joji Matsuoka	Yarô Abe	October 31, 2019
Middle-aged magazine writer Yara stops by Master's diner to enjoy cheese-stuffed chicken cutlets. Hikaru, a hostess, orders the same dish as Yara based on what her horoscope told her earlier that day. Yara develops a fascination with Hikaru, and attempts to use their mutual interest in astrology to charm her into falling in love with him. Featured dish: Cheese-stuffed chicken cutlet
43	3	"Plum Rice Ball"	Joji Matsuoka	Yarô Abe	October 31, 2019
One night, a lost old man enters the diner. He does not speak much or introduce himself as he orders rice and sour plums. The next day, he goes with Mr. Chu to Marilyn's strip club where she recognizes him as Mr. Umemiya, her old bookkeeping teacher in high school. Mr. Umemiya does not seem to remember anything, apart from his desire to find and spend time with Marilyn. Featured dish: Sour plum onigiri
44	4	"Fried Chicken Wings"	Joji Matsuoka	Yarô Abe	October 31, 2019
Chizuru is a 34-year-old gravure model who dreams of finding a husband that will make her happy. Her agent reminds her that she is unlikely to still be a model after 35. At the request of her friend, Chizuru goes to a party for rich CEOs in Roppongi where she meets Toru Kanzaki, a millionaire CEO who works in IT. He asks Chizuru on a date to Master's diner but the other patrons are suspicious of his wealth. Featured dish: Tebasaki karaage
45	5	"Yakisoba Dog"	Joji Matsuoka	Yarô Abe	October 31, 2019
Kotani is a former baseball player who now owns a chain of successful cat cafés in Tokyo. He frequents Master's diner to eat yakisoba stuffed into hot dog buns thus creating "yakisoba dogs". When the other patrons ask him about the origins of this dish, Kotani remembers the summer beach trip he took with his friend Yokokawa where all they ate were yakisoba dogs. He decides to track down his old friend and discovers that he is the coach of a high school baseball team. Featured dish: None (The episode features yakisoba dogs in major scenes and in flashbacks but does not provide any cooking instructions to the audience. This is most likely due to yakisoba instructions being given in the Season 1 episode "Sauce yakisoba".)
46	6	"Salmon and Mushrooms"	Joji Matsuoka	Yarô Abe	October 31, 2019
Over the past 10 years, the Ueharas have lived their dream of running a small barber shop. Their favorite food is baked salmon with mushrooms, a fusion dish indicative of their two distinct upbringings: Mrs. Uehara grew up on a frigid coastline village in northern Japan while Mr. Uehara grew up deep in the mountains of central Japan. When Mrs. Uehara goes on a trip to Shanghai, Mr. Uehara is forced to attend to all their clients, including a mystifying newcomer dressed in a beautiful kimono. Featured dish: Baked salmon with mushrooms
47	7	"Kitsune Udon"	Joji Matsuoka	Yarô Abe	October 31, 2019
Akina and Haruna are young, aspiring voice actresses who seek out Master's diner after hearing a rumor online that eating a bowl of kitsune udon will grant you one wish. After six months and many bowls of udon, only Akina's luck seems to have improved, leading to a rift between the two friends in an already fiercely competitive industry. Featured dish: Kitsune udon
48	8	"Curry Ramen"	Joji Matsuoka	Yarô Abe	October 31, 2019
A pachinko parlor clerk named Kabayama reconnects with his old middle school classmate Shuichi. They eat dinner at Master's diner, consisting of Japanese-style curry ladled over ramen noodles. Shuichi recalls first eating this dish at Kabayama's home when they were kids, but as both former schoolmates come to learn, appearances can be deceiving. Featured dish: Japanese curry over ramen
49	9	"Sweet Rolled Omelet"	Joji Matsuoka	Yarô Abe	October 31, 2019
A comedy of errors leads to a stand-off at Master's diner between supposed members of a Chinese Triad and the Yakuza. As both groups prepare to battle, a man named Lee Punfa appears and informs Master that the men are actually part of his film production team. Mr. Lee reveals that he is the son of a famous Chinese director, and came to Japan to find the actor that starred in his father's famously unfinished final film. His only memory of the man is that he enjoyed making tamagoyaki. (Special Note: This is the second episode of the series to feature a region outside Japan as a location for part of the story. This is also the first episode to portray a culture other than Japanese, as many lines of dialogue are spoken in Mandarin and the films shown are historical dramas dealing with Chinese history from the 13th century.) Featured dish: None (The episode features tamagoyaki in major scenes but does not provide any cooking instructions to the audience. This is most likely due to tamagoyaki instructions being featured in the pilot episode of the show.)
50	10	"Crab and Toshikoshi Soba"	Joji Matsuoka	Yarô Abe	October 31, 2019
The diner patrons express a collective desire for a fresh start as another year comes to an end. Gen meets a woman he nicknames "Nori-chan" who turns out to be a figure from Master's past who wronged him. Master forgives her after she shows remorse, and treats them to an entire roasted red king crab on Christmas Eve. Officer Kogure forms a bond with the mute woman after she teaches him a new way to serve ramen. At the same time, he plays a small role in Detective Izumi's sting operation to catch a group of scam artists who target women like Nori-chan in need of money. Seita and Saori bicker as to who will inherit the family soba business, but learn to put their differences aside when Master needs help preparing New Years soba for his patrons. Master's relationship with Chieko deepens as the pair feed the crowd of regulars gathered at Meshi-ya to greet the new year. Outside, snow falls on the streets of Shinjuku as Master's voice-over recites his opening narration. Featured dish: None (The episode features king crab and toshikoshi soba in major scenes but does not provide any cooking instructions to the audience.)

=== Season 6 ===
(Released as "Midnight Diner (Season 6)").

No. overall	No. in season	Title	Directed by	Written by	Original release date
51	1	"Episode 1"	Joji Matsuoka	Yarô Abe	October 20, 2026
As the pandemic empties the diner, the Master closes up and takes a vacation for some time. Just as worried regulars wonder what's become of him, the Master reopens. Featured dish: None
52	2	"Episode 2"	Joji Matsuoka	Yarô Abe	October 28, 2026
Professor Hirota visits the diner monthly to honor his late wife Emiko with carrot stir-fry. Another diner, Mr. Higa spots the dish, provoking memories of his ex-girlfriend. Higa gradually becomes friends with Hirota until he realizes that Emiko was his ex-girlfriend, who Hirota married after she broke up with Higa due to career disagreements but died shortly afterwards from an illness. As Hirota recounts his relationship, an emotional Higa offers a toast to Emiko while concealing his relationship with her. Featured dish: Carrot stir-fry
53	3	"Episode 3"	Joji Matsuoka	Yarô Abe	November 4, 2026
Kuboi, a manga artist, celebrates his success by ordering konjac at the diner. At a book-signing, he comes across his high-school crush Maki, now a divorced mother to Miwa. After reconnecting with her, Kuboi proposes using his earnings to finance Miwa's college education. Maki accepts the proposal, but Kuboi's excitement is short-lived when Maki reintroduces him to their classmate Ikeda, who has become Maki's fiancé. Featured dish: Spicy konjac
54	4	"Episode 4"	Joji Matsuoka	Yarô Abe	November 11, 2026
TBA Featured dish: Pork cutlet sandwich
55	5	"Episode 5"	Joji Matsuoka	Yarô Abe	TBA
TBA Hirayama is eating food at the midnight dinner, depressed about his job when a woman appears and orders food. She confesses that she cannot pay, however the manHirayama takes pity on her and pays the cost of her meal. She has left her house with no money, so the Hirayama lets her stay at his house as a live in housekeeper. Over time, she grows fond of the man and his son. She buys a lottery ticket with the housekeeping, and offers it to him, howeer the Hirayama gifts her the winnings, upon which she dissapears. Eventually she reappears after two days at the midnight diner, where she announces she gave the money to her ex husband, but that will be the last she sees of him. She returns with Hirayama and his son to the house to continue living with them. Featured dish: Strawberries and condensed cream
56	6	"Episode 6"	Joji Matsuoka	Yarô Abe	TBA
TBA Featured dish: TBA
57	7	"Episode 7"	Joji Matsuoka	Yarô Abe	TBA
TBA Featured dish: TBA
58	8	"Episode 8"	Joji Matsuoka	Yarô Abe	TBA
TBA Featured dish: TBA
59	9	"Episode 9"	Joji Matsuoka	Yarô Abe	TBA
TBA Featured dish: TBA
60	10	"Episode 10"	Joji Matsuoka	Yarô Abe	TBA
TBA Featured dish: TBA
