= Paofan =

Teochew rice dish

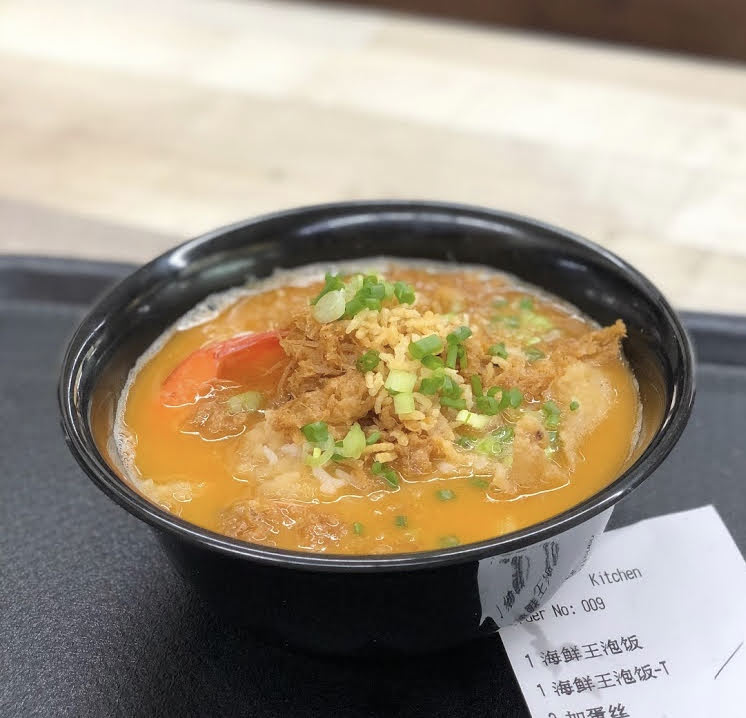
Seafood Paofan in Singapore

Paofan (simplified Chinese: 泡饭; traditional Chinese: 泡飯; pinyin: pàofàn; lit. 'submerged rice') is a dish in Teochew cuisine popular in Singapore. Other versions of Paofan can be found in Taiwan, Korea and Japan, where rice and seafood are the main staples for the farmers during the harvest. Once the domain of restaurants, Paofan has recently been offered in low-cost establishments. It consists of rice soaked in broth brewed from pork, fish bones and prawn, typically served with seafood, fried egg floss and crispy rice. The popularity of paofan has risen in Singapore in 2021, with the emergence of a premium lobster version.

== See also ==
- Gukbap, a similar Korean dish
- Chazuke, a Japanese dish made from tea and cooked rice
- Lei cha, a Hakka tea and rice dish
- Cơm hến, a Vietnamese dish made from rice and baby clams soup
