= 25th Japan Film Professional Awards =

Japanese film awards in 2016

- Date: May 3, 2016
- Site: Theatre Shinjuku, Tokyo, Japan

The 25th Japan Film Professional Awards (第25回日本映画プロフェッショナル大賞) was the 25th edition of the Japan Film Professional Awards. Films of 2015 which had not already won a major domestic film award were eligible. The ceremony took place on May 3, 2016, at Theatre Shinjuku in Tokyo.

== Awards ==
- Best Film: Bakuman
- Best Director: Shinya Tsukamoto (Fires on the Plain)
- Best Actress: Mikako Tabe (Piece of Cake, Midnight Diner)
- Best Actor: Shota Sometani (Kabukicho Love Hotel, Soredake / That's It)
- Best Actor: Yōta Kawase (Rolling, Yaru Otoko, Unfinished Book, Unfinished Love)
- New Director: Yuka Yasukawa (Dressing Up)
- Emerging Producer: Seigo Fukada, Hitoshi Ono (Three Stories of Love)
- Special Achievement: Akiko Ashizawa (For Journey to the Shore and her many years of cinematography.)

== 10 best films ==
1. Bakuman (Hitoshi Ōne)
2. Fires on the Plain (Shinya Tsukamoto)
3. Rolling (Masanori Tominaga)
4. Gonin Saga (Takashi Ishii)
5. Happy Hour (Ryusuke Hamaguchi)
6. Journey to the Shore (Kiyoshi Kurosawa)
7. Soredake / That's It (Gakuryū Ishii)
8. Pieta in the Toilet (Daishi Matsunaga)
9. Being Good (Mipo O)
9. Our Huff and Puff Journey (Daigo Matsui)
