= Mikako Tabe =

Japanese actress (born 1989)

- 多部 未華子
- Born: January 25, 1989 (age 37); Nishitokyo, Tokyo, Japan
- Other name: たべちゃん (Tabe-Chan)
- Occupation: Actress
- Years active: 2002–present
- Spouse: Takaki Kumada (m. 2019)
- Children: 1
- Website: tabemikako.com

Mikako Tabe (多部 未華子, Tabe Mikako; born January 25, 1989) is a Japanese actress from Nishitokyo, Tokyo. Starting acting in her teens with a role in the Sailor Moon musicals, she has developed into a lead actress in film and television, playing the heroine in the Asadora Tsubasa, starring in TV comedy series such Yasuko to Kenji and Deka Wanko, and playing the lead in films such as Kimi ni Todoke and Piece of Cake.

== Career ==
Tabe was born in Nishitokyo, Tokyo and began working in entertainment in 2002 at the age of 13. Her debut as an actress was in the Wowow drama Riyū in 2004. Her acting in the films Hinokio and Aozora no yukue earned her the Blue Ribbon Awards for Best Newcomer in 2006. In 2008, she was selected from the 1593 actresses who auditioned to play the heroine of the NHK Asadora Tsubasa, which ran for 156 episodes from March to September 2009.

== Filmography ==
=== Feature films and movies ===
Japanese Title	English Title	Year	Role	Notes	Ref.
理由	The Reason	2004	Shinoda Izumi		
ゴーヤーちゃんぷるー	Gōyā Chanpurū	2005	Hiromi Suzuki	Lead role	
Change the World!	Change the World!	2005	Angel school girl		
ヒノキオ	Hinokio: Inter Galactic Love	2005	Kudo Jun		
青空のゆくえ	Way of Blue Sky	2005	Haruna Kawahara		
ルート225	Route 225	2006	Jericho Tanaka	Lead role	
夜のピクニック	Night Time Picnic	2006	Takako Koda	Lead role	
俺は、君のためにこそ死ににいく	For Those We Love	2007	Reiko		
西遊記	The Adventures of Super Monkey	2007	Princess Reimi		
こわい童謡 表の章	Kowai dōyō: Omote no shō	2007	Masaki Ayane	Lead role	
こわい童謡 裏の章	The Scary Folklore: Ura no Sho	2007	Masaki Ayane	Lead role	
フィッシュストーリー	Fish Story	2009	Asami		
ケンタとジュンとカヨちゃんの国	A Crowd of Three	2010	Yumika		
君に届け	From Me to You	2010	Sawako Kuronuma	Lead role	
源氏物語 千年の謎	Tale of Genji: A Thousand Year Engima	2011	Aoi no Ue		
LIAR GAME -再生-	Liar Game: Reborn	2012	Shinomiya Yū		
深夜食堂	Midnight Diner	2014	Kuriyama Michiru		
ピース オブ ケイク	Piece of Cake	2015	Shino Umemiya	Lead role	
視覚探偵 日暮旅人	Shikaku Tantei Higurashi Tabito	2015	Yamakawa Yoko		
あやしい彼女	Sing My Life	2016	Katsu Seyama / Setsuko Otori	Lead role	
日日是好日	Every Day a Good Day	2018	Michiko		
トラさん	Tiger: My Life as a Cat	2019	Nanako		
多十郎殉愛記	Love's Twisting Path	2019	Otoyo		
アイネクライネナハトムジーク	Little Nights, Little Love	2019	Saki "shampoo-san" Honma		
空に住む	Living in the Sky	2020	Naomi	Lead role	
流浪の月	Wandering	2022	Ayumi Tani		

=== Short films and movies ===
Japanese Title	Romaji Title	Year	Role	Notes
東京危機一髪	Tokyo Kiki Ippatsu (Crisis of Tokyo) – Tokyo Girl Episode #004	2003	A young woman	A short film by 68 FILMS
真夜中からとびうつれ	Mayonaka kara tobiutsure	2011	A girl in a blue dress	A short film by Yokohama Satoko

== Plays and musicals ==
=== Plays ===
Title	Year	Role	Notes
Love Letters	2009	Nakao Akiyoshi	375th performance of 20th season at PARCO Theater (12/10/2009)
Nōgyō shōjo (Farm Girl)	2010	Farmer's daughter	Tokyo Metropolitan Art Space (March 2010)
Salome	2012	Princess Salome	New National Theatre Tokyo (June 2012)
Fukusuke	2012	Hotetoru Hideichi	Bunkamura Theatre Cocoon Tokyo (August 2012)
Never Let Me Go	2014	Kathy	Stage Play based on the novel by Ishiguro Kazuo at Saitama Arts Theater from April 29 to May 15
Kirei ~ kamisama to machiawase shita on'na ~	2014		Bunkamura Theatre Cocoon Tokyo (December 2014)

=== Musicals ===
Title	Year	Role	Notes
Sailor Moon musicals	2003	Yaten Kou	Second Stage – Marina Moon (Starlights-Ryuusei Densetsu)
Sailor Moon musicals	2004	Yaten Kou	Second Stage – Marina Moon (Kakyuu-ouhi Kourin)

== Television ==
=== Dramas ===
Japanese Title	Romaji Title	Year	Role	Notes	Ref.
対岸の彼女	Taigan no kanojo	2006	Noguchi Nanako		
すみれの花咲く頃	Sumire no Hana Saku Koro	2007	Endo Kimiko	Lead role	
山田太郎ものがたり	Yamada Tarō Monogatari	2007	Takako Ikegami		
鹿男あをによし	Shikaotoko Aoniyoshi	2008	Ito Hotta		
ヤスコとケンジ	Yasuko to Kenji	2008	Yasuko Oki		
つばさ	Tsubasa	2009	Tsubasa Tamaki	Lead role; Asadora	
不毛地帯	The Waste Land	2009	Naoko Iki		
GM~踊れドクター	GM: Odore Dokuta	2010	Momoko Komukai		
デカワンコ	Deka Wanko	2011	Hanamori Ichiko	Lead role	
ジウ 警視庁特殊犯捜査係	Jiu: Keishichou Tokushuhan Sousakei	2011	Kadokura Misaki	Lead role	
デカワンコ 新春スペシャル	Deka Wanko Shinshun Supesharu	2012	Hanamori Ichiko	Lead role; TV movie	
浪花少年探偵団	Naniwa Shōnentanteidan	2012	Shinobu Takeuchi	Lead role	
大奥[有功・家光篇]	Ōoku: Arikoto-Iemitsu Hen	2012	Tokugawa Iemitsu		
『ラストホープ』	Last Hope	2013	Tachibana Ayumi		
怪物	Kaibutsu	2013	Risa Fujiidera		
I Love You	I Love You	2013	Moe		
東京バンドワゴン～下町大家族物語	Tokyo Bandwagon ~ Shitamachi Daizoku Monogatari	2013	Suzumi Makino		
僕のいた時間	Boku no Ita Jikan	2014	Megumi Hongo		
植物男子ベランダー	Botanical Life of Verandar	2014	Mizuhara Renge		
永遠の0	Eien no Zero	2015	Matsuno Miyabe		
ドS刑事	Do S Deka	2015	Maya Kuroi	Lead role	
深夜食堂 第四部	Midnight Diner: Tokyo Stories	2016	Kuriyama Michiru		
深夜食堂 2	Midnight Diner 2	2016	Kuriyama Michiru		
仰げば尊し	Brass Dreams	2016	Hikuma Natsuki		
わたしに運命の恋なんてありえないって思ってた	My Long Awaited Love Story	2016	Shirano Riko	Lead role	
ツバキ文具店～鎌倉代書屋物語～	Tsubaki Stationery Store	2017	Amemiya Hatoko	Lead role	
先に生まれただけの僕	My High School Business	2017	Satoko Matsubara		
二つの祖国	Two Homelands	2019	Nagiko Imoto		
これは経費で落ちません！	You Can't Expense This!	2019	Sanako Moriwaka	Lead role	
太陽は動かない —The Eclipse—	The Sun Stands Still: The Eclipse	2020	Ochiai		
私の家政夫ナギサさん	My Housekeeper Nagisa-san	2020	Mei Aihara	Lead role	
風、薫る	The Scent of the Wind	2026	Ōyama Sutematsu	Asadora	
クロエマ	Chloe et Emma	2026	Chloe	Lead role	

== Animations and games ==
=== Games ===
Japanese Title	English Title	Year	Role	Notes	Ref.
二ノ国 白き聖灰の女王	Ni no Kuni: Wrath of the White Witch	2012	Oliver		

=== Animations ===
Japanese Title	English Title	Year	Role	Notes	Ref.
リラックマとカオルさん	Rilakkuma and Kaoru	2019	Kaoru	ONA, exclusively released on Netflix	
ボス・ベイビー ファミリー・ミッション	The Boss Baby: Family Business	2021	Tina Templeton	Film, Japanese voice dub	
インサイド・ヘッド2	Inside Out 2	2024	Anxiety	Film, Japanese voice dub	

== Awards and prizes ==
=== Awards ===
Year	Award	Category	Title	Result	Ref.
2005	15th Japan Movie Critics Awards	Newcomer of the Year (Kazuko Komori Award)	Hinokio	Won	
2005	48th Blue Ribbon Awards	Newcomer of the Year	Hinokio, Aozora no yukue	Won	
2006	21st Takasaki Film Festival Awards	Best New Actress	Rūto 225	Won	
2010	34th Elan d'or Awards	Rookie of the Year	Herself	Won	
2011	18th Yomiuri Engeki Awards	Newcomer of the Year (Haruko Sugimura Award)	Nōgyō shōjo	Won	
2016	25th Japan Film Professional Awards	Best Actress	Piece of Cake, Shinya Shokudō	Won	

Preceded by Momoko Okuyama	Yaten Kou/Sailor Star Healer; 2003-2004	Succeeded by none
