= Yoichi Nukumizu =

Japanese actor and television personality

- 温水 洋一
- Born: 19 June 1964 (age 62); Miyakonojō, Miyazaki Prefecture, Japan
- Occupation: Actor
- Years active: 1988–
- Notable work: Majo no Jōken; Yome wa Mitsuboshi; Monster Parent; Nukunuku; TakaToshi & Nukumizu ga Iku Chīsana Tabi Series
- Website: Official website

Yoichi Nukumizu (温水 洋一, Nukumizu Yōichi; born 19 June 1964) is a Japanese actor and television personality. He is nicknamed Nukkun (ぬっくん). He was born from Miyakonojō, Miyazaki Prefecture.

== Personal life, biography ==
After graduating from the Miyazaki Prefecture Shoto Municipal High School, after two nights, he went to Nihon Fukushi University School of Social Welfare. He graduated from the university in March 1989. From 1988 to 1994 he enrolled in the Theatre Company "Otona Keikaku". While he was enrolled, he had a pair of "nose and small box" together with Suzuki Matsuo.

Since his regular appearances in Naoto Takenaka's controle programme Naoto Takenaka no Koi no Vacance in 1994, his unique character is also known to the tea room, and since then his appearances on television programmes will increase. He established the office "One Two Three" in 1998 with Hajime Anzai, Toshifumi Muramatsu, et al. He appeared in numerous stages and dramas as an individuality actor, and also appeared in various variety shows.

In 1999, when he appeared in Akashiya Mansion Monogatari, he was nicknamed "Nukkun" from Sanma Akashiya. Since then many have appeared on television programmes and controls in Sanma moderatories.

It is made a story that his hair is thinning, and treats it himself as a neta. In addition, he actively appeared in various variety programmes as well. This is due to the greedy posture of wanting "to train the sense of laughter", and he talks about his own idea as he felt "like laughter, the feeling is most deviated with age. So, I'd like to do something that the young people say it's funny no matter how long they have passed."

At the Miyazaki Bougainvillea Airport from 15 December 2016, the "Hinata Nukunuku Bench" that can sit with the whole figure of himself was established for a limited time.

In 2017, he won the 52nd Kinokuniya Theater Award Individual Award.

== Appearances ==
=== TV dramas ===
- Sanada Maru (2016), Oyamada Nobushige
- Hiru no Sento Sake Episode 1 (2016)
- Kaitou Sentai Lupinranger VS Keisatsu Sentai Patranger (2018), Kogure
- The Grand Family (2021)

=== Films ===
- Little Forest: Summer & Autumn (2014), Shigeyuki
- Little Forest: Winter & Spring (2015), Shigeyuki
- Sing My Life (2016), Photographer owner
- Sabuibo Mask (2016), Torani
- Inori (2021)
- Tyida (2022)
- Hatsukoi Geinin (2025), Yoshio Sato

=== Dubbing ===
- Haunted Mansion (2023), Bruce Davis (Danny DeVito)

== See also ==
- List of Japanese actors
