= Poon choi =

Cantonese meal served in a communal bowl

Poon Choi
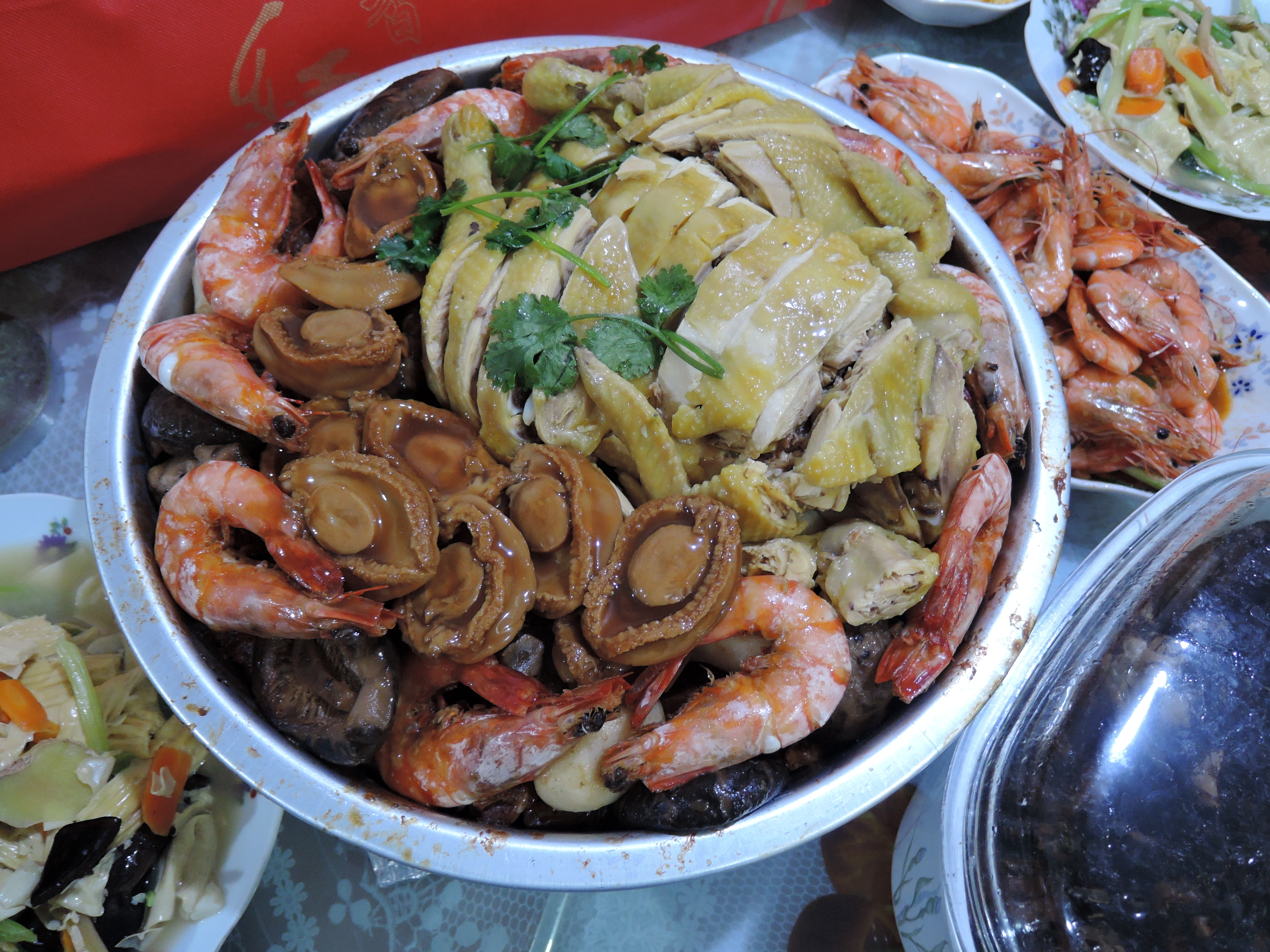
- Course: Main course
- Place of origin: Hong Kong
- Region or state: Hong Kong
- Serving temperature: Hot

Poon choi
- Traditional Chinese: 盆菜
- Simplified Chinese: 盆菜
- Literal meaning: basin-dish
Transcriptions
Standard Mandarin
- Hanyu Pinyin: pén cài
- Wade–Giles: p'en ts'ai
Hakka
- Romanization: pun choi
Yue: Cantonese
- Yale Romanization: pùhn choi
- Jyutping: pun^{4} coi^{3}

Poon choi or puhn choi (pronounced: pun4 coi3 in Cantonese and pun choi in Hakka), pén cài in pinyin, is a Hakka festival meal composed of many layers of different ingredients. It is served in large wooden, porcelain or metal basins called poon, due to the communal style of consumption. The Cantonese name, transliterated as Poon choi, has been variously translated as "big bowl feast", "basin cuisine" or "Canton casserole". The dish is popular among Cantonese people.

== Origin ==
According to tradition, Poon choi was invented during the late Sung dynasty. When Mongol troops invaded Sung China, the young Emperor fled to the area around Guangdong Province and Hong Kong. To serve the Emperor as well as his army, the locals collected all their best food available, cooked it. But there were not enough serving containers available, so they put the resulting meal in large wooden washbasins.

=== Association with the New Territories ===
In any event, Poon choi is associated with the early settlers of the New Territories, who had been driven south of the mainland by a series of barbarian invasions in China between the 13th and 17th centuries.

Walled village culture is well preserved in the New Territories and Poon choi gradually became a traditional dish of the walled villages. As Poon choi is a large dish portioned to be suitable for a communal meal, it was served whenever there were celebrations connected with rituals, weddings, festivals, ancestor worship and other local events as an expression of village dining culture.

== Ingredients ==
Poon choi includes ingredients such as pork, beef, lamb, chicken, duck, abalone, ginseng, shark fin, fish maw, prawn, crab, dried mushroom, fishballs, squid, dried eel, dried shrimp, pigskin, chicken feet, duck feet, goose feet, bean curd and Chinese white radish.

Out of respect to their guests the villagers put only a relatively small amount of vegetables in Poon choi. To walled villagers, vegetables are not highly valued ingredients. In order to offer the best food during important annual events, villagers prefer to include mostly meat and seafood in Poon choi.

=== Preparation ===
Three days are traditionally required for preparing and cooking the meal.

On the first day, firewood is gathered from the mountains and chopped, following practice when liquefied petroleum gas was unavailable due to beliefs that wood is stronger and longer lasting than LPG, producing a distinct flavor.

On the second day, fresh ingredients are purchased for flavor and because some in rural communities lack refrigerators. Since traditional Poon choi is used for festive banquets in ancestral halls, it is considered disrespectful to the ancestors and gods if canned, frozen, or ready-to-eat products are used.

Pork is stewed over the third day, starting in the early morning. It is popularly believed that ancestors cooked Witou pork for at least 10 hours in order for the 'half fat-half lean' pork bellies to become tender. A few decades ago, preparing Poon choi was considered a test for chefs because the long cooking time on a wooden stove for the patience and stove control required.

Ingredients are layered, with those including Chinese radishes, pigskins and bean curd at the bottom, usually pork and Chinese dried mushrooms in the middle, and rare ingredients like abalone and sea cucumber at the top. Ingredients placed at the top have little capacity to absorb sauce which migrates during eating, while those at the bottom do.

=== Consumption ===
Poon choi is typically eaten layer by layer rather than stirring, although sometimes the layers are broken in an effort to eat the daikon radish at the bottom. Dried noodles with egg are sometimes placed atop to symbolise a crown.

== Cultural aspects ==
Poon choi is often served during religious rituals, festivals, special occasions and wedding banquets in the open areas of villages. From the 1990s, It became popular among urban dwellers as is available at various Cantonese restaurants in autumn and winter and on select occasions.

Selecting the ingredients considered the best and most fresh is perceived to be a way of respecting ancestors and expressing the value of hospitality. Preparations vary by village and are protected through not sharing with outsiders and by passing on to children. The communal dining, not distinguished by class is understood to reflect a value of equality. The social meaning of Poon choi feasts being an endorsement is seen when they are not held, for instance, when a marriage is not endorsed.

=== Manner of eating ===
Traditional Poon choi is served in a big wooden basin. There is one on each table and every person at the table takes food from the basin, layer by layer, from the top to the bottom.

Today, people use 'Gun Fai' (clean chopsticks used to move food from serving basin to personal bowl) to get the food. This allows the diner to pick out particular pieces of food from the bottom of the serving basin as well. It is also becoming more acceptable to use these chopsticks to mix and turn over the food. These acts are attached symbolic value: encouraging good fortune and collaboration.

== Poon Choi Characteristics ==
Poon choi is a traditional food system in the walled villages. Whether it is festival celebration or worship ancestors, it is related to Poon choi. The villagers' gathering of basin meal is a crucial process in "confirmation of identity". Any family with a boy newly born will light up a lamp in the ancestral hall and invite the villagers to participate in the "lamp gathering", that is a Poon choi feast to celebrate the new male. After the ceremony was completed, the newborn male was officially recognized as a member of the village and had the right to inherit the property. As for the wedding tradition, the couple will raise a day to invite relatives to the Poon choi feast, which implies they are recognized the marriage. Also, after the spring and autumn ancestral worship, they reunited and ate Poon choi together.

The Poon choi is symbolized to "unity". In the traditional Poon choi feast, people are not sent the invitation cards to the villagers. Only a red notice of the Poon Choi feast will be posted at the door of the village, their relatives and friends will naturally come to this festival. The villagers used the Poon choi feast to reach the whole village without any distinction, becoming an individual, united and harmonious. This symbolic meaning has been passed down to the present day, Poon choi is no longer limited in the walled village. It has been widely developed in Hong Kong, people will eat Poon choi during the Chinese New Year and other dinner party.

== Modern Poon choi ==
=== Reasons for popularity ===
Poon choi meals are becoming more and more popular, one of the reasons being promotion by mass media, which widely publicise Poon choi events, such as the 1997 large-scale Poon choi banquet, and the Poon Choi banquet held by Heung Yee Kuk. Another reason is the economic downturn. Since Poon choi contains a large amount of many ingredients, Hong Kong people think the cost is lower than other types of restaurant meals. Poon choi also represents Hong Kong's food culture and creativity. Although it is a traditional cuisine of Hong Kong walled villages the ingredients have changed over the past decades and become more diversified to suit peoples' varying palates and tastes.

Nowadays, Poon Choi stores are being launched in the urban districts. To maintain their competitiveness, these stores provide various conveniences and varieties to fulfill consumer needs and wants. They also invest the name Poon choi with meanings mostly symbolic of fortune as a gimmick to attract people.

=== Location ===
In the past, citizens had to take the time to visit the walled villages in order to enjoy Poon choi. It was of course also a valuable opportunity for them to escape the hustle and bustle of the city for a while.

Nowadays, eating Poon choi is not only limited to people living in or visiting walled villages. During festivals, urban citizens can now enjoy Poon choi from Chinese fast food restaurant, such as Café de Coral, Fairwood. Even when it is not festival time, residents can also purchase Poon choi in some specialised stores, like 八味香帝皇盆菜專門店, 洪運正宗盆菜, Poon choi has become a meal that people can enjoy anywhere and anytime.

In 2003, a Poon choi feast was held in the former Kai Tak airport. It had 660 tables, seating 12 people per table; together with the staff a total of nearly ten thousand people participated. This event broke the world record for the highest number of people gathered to eating Poon choi.

=== Convenience ===
Delivery service is provided so that the stores can ensure that all people, especially those living far away, can enjoy Poon choi and purchase it from a store. Delivery service is no doubt convenient when there are activities organised by local organisations or the government which feature a Poon choi feast. As these customers order bulk amounts, the stores give discounts or provide free materials, like tables, a gas stove, and tableware together with the Poon choi.

Ordering by phone or online enables customers to conveniently order Poon choi, since it eliminate the need for them to take time to visit the stores. The stores immediately start preparation once they have received the order, increasing efficiency.

The advertising leaflets from these stores usually offer customers a choice of big, medium and small amounts of Poon choi. With standard quantities and prices, people can easily determine how much they wish to order. Standardisation also reduces conflicts between the store and customers.

At present, stores use an aluminium foil cover to retain the heat of the wrapped Poon choi. Together with a large plastic bag with handles to bear the weight, this meal can easily be transported. No doubt these innovations ease the burden on customers in a hurry.

Different from traditional reheating methods, nowadays restaurants use a portable gas stove to warm the Poon choi before it is served. It can also be used at a table to maintain the warmth continuously and hence guarantee the quality and taste.

=== Variety ===
Poon chi has In the past, people ate Poon choi with rice only, but now they have more choices. They may choose other carbohydrates, like noodles or udon, depending on their eating habits.

Providing a variety of price categories allows people also to choose the diversity of delicacies which they can afford. Relatively high priced Poon choi includes luxury food such as abalones, shark fin, oyster, which people may select to gain honour by showing that they are generous and wealthy. Those who prefer a reasonable price can have a meal with more common ingredients.

As an international hub, Hong Kong can provide diners with a variety of flavours. There is now available Japanese Poon choi, curry Poon choi, Western Poon choi, and vegetarian Poon choi, all in a bid to fulfill different needs and wants of customers, whether locals or tourists.

== See also ==
- Cuisine of Hong Kong
- Sung Wong Toi
- Wen Tianxiang
