= Sing My Life =

- Directed by: Nobuo Mizuta
- Screenplay by: Tomoko Yoshizawa
- Produced by: Naoto Hatakeyama; Kasumi Yao
- Starring: Mikako Tabe; Mitsuko Baisho
- Cinematography: Koichi Nakayama
- Release date: April 1, 2016 (Japan)
- Running time: 125 minutes
- Country: Japan
- Language: Japanese

Sing My Life (Japanese: あやしい彼女, Hepburn: Ayashii Kanojo) is a 2016 Japanese comedy film directed by Nobuo Mizuta. A remake of the 2014 South Korean film Miss Granny, it stars Mikako Tabe and Mitsuko Baisho.

== Cast ==
- Mikako Tabe as Setsuko Otori
- Mitsuko Baisho as Katsu Setayama
- Satomi Kobayashi as Yukie Seyama
- Jun Kaname as Takuto Kobayashi
- Takumi Kitamura as Tsubasa Seyama
- Yoichi Nukumizu as photo studio owner
- Kotaro Shiga as Jiro Nakata
