= Tokyo Tower: Mom and Me, and Sometimes Dad =

- Theatrical poster for Tokyo Tower: Mom and Me, and Sometimes Dad (2007)
- Directed by: Joji Matsuoka
- Written by: Lily Franky (novel); Suzuki Matsuo (screenplay)
- Produced by: Kanji Miura; Genichi Miwa
- Starring: Jō Odagiri; Kirin Kiki; Yayako Uchida
- Cinematography: Norimichi Kasamatsu
- Edited by: Shinichi Fushima
- Music by: Tadashi Ueda
- Distributed by: Shochiku
- Release date: April 14, 2007 (Japan)
- Running time: 142 minutes
- Country: Japan
- Language: Japanese
- Box office: $16,227,662

Tokyo Tower: Mom and Me, and Sometimes Dad (Japanese: 東京タワー 〜オカンとボクと、時々、オトン〜, Hepburn: Tōkyō tawaa ~ okan to boku to, tokidoki, oton ~) is a 2007 Japanese drama film directed by Joji Matsuoka. The film is adapted from the best selling autobiography of Lily Franky, a Japanese novelist, actor, illustrator, designer, musician and photographer. The young Eiko is played by Yayako Uchida, the daughter of actress Kirin Kiki who plays Eiko as an old woman. The film was chosen as the Best Film of 2008 at the Japan Academy Prize ceremony.

== Plot ==
A young man who has inherited the irresponsible character of his father must care for his cancer-stricken mother when she moves in with him in Tokyo. Her wise and responsible nature causes him to reorganize his life.

== Cast ==
- Jō Odagiri: Masaya
- Kirin Kiki: Eiko
- Yayako Uchida: Eiko - young
- Takako Matsu: Mizue
- Seiji Rokkaku: Editor-in-chief
- Kaoru Kobayashi: Oton

Others include : Akira Emoto, Itsuji Itao, Ayumi Ito, Ryo Katsuji, Kyōko Koizumi, Hitomi Kurihara, Miyuki Matsuda, Ken Mitsuishi, Aoi Miyazaki, Noriko Sengoku, Tomorowo Taguchi, Rena Takeshita, Tetsushi Tanaka, Susumu Terajima, ...

== Reception ==
The film won five awards at the 2008 Japan Academy Prizes: Best Film, Best Director, Screenplay of the Year, Best Actress in a Leading Role and Best Actor in a Supporting Role. It also receive nominations for Best Actor in a Leading Role, Best Actress in a Supporting Role and Rookie of the Year. It was also nominated for Best Actor, Best Actress and Best Supporting Actor at the 2nd Asian Film Awards.

== Location ==
Much of the movie's Kokura segments were filmed in Uguisuzawa, Miyagi's Hosokura mine district.
