= Chloe et Emma =

Japanese manga series

- Cover of the first volume

クロエマ (Kuroema)
- Genre: Drama
- Manga
- Written by: Tsunami Umino
- Published by: Kodansha
- Imprint: KC Kiss
- Magazine: Kiss
- Original run: August 25, 2022 – June 25, 2026
- Volumes: 5
- Television drama
- Directed by: Rikiya Imaizumi
- Written by: Rikiya Imaizumi; Kaori Imaizumi
- Studio: WOWOW
- Licensed by: Amazon Prime Video
- Original run: June 12, 2026
- Episodes: 5

Chloe et Emma (Japanese: クロエマ, Hepburn: Kuroema) is a Japanese manga series written and illustrated by Tsunami Umino. It was serialized in Kodansha's Kiss magazine from August 2022 to June 2026, with its chapters collected in five volumes. A television drama adaptation was streamed on Amazon Prime Video in June 2026.

== Plot ==
Emma, a 30-year-old woman, wanders in Chloe's mansion, who's an eccentric millionaire, after her boyfriend leaves her and she loses her job. While intending to stay only one night, Emma learns her apartment has burnt down, and has to stay with Chloe permanently,

== Media ==
=== Manga ===
Chloe et Emma, written and illustrated by Tsunami Umino was serialized in Kodansha's Kiss magazine from August 25, 2022, to June 25, 2026. It was published in five volumes.

| No. | Release date | ISBN |
|---|---|---|
| 1 | June 13, 2023 | 978-4-06-531837-9 |
| 2 | March 13, 2024 | 978-4-06-534905-2 |
| 3 | February 13, 2025 | 978-4-06-538492-3 |
| 4 | March 13, 2026 | 978-4-06-542894-8 |
| 5 | August 12, 2026 | 978-4-06-544510-5 |

=== Drama ===
A television drama adaptation produced by WOWOW was announced in March 2026. The series stars Hana Sugisaki as Emma and Mikako Tabe as Chloe. It was streamed on Amazon Prime Video on June 12, 2026 and ran for five episodes. The theme song is "sign", performed by Lausub.
