= Hinokio =

- Hinokio film poster
- Directed by: Takahiko Akiyama
- Written by: Takahiko Akiyama; Masumi Suetani; Shoji Yonemura
- Produced by: Shuuji Uchiyama; Hidekazu Uehara; Takuji Ushiyama
- Starring: Masatoshi Nakamura; Kanata Hongo; Mikako Tabe
- Cinematography: Masakazu Oka
- Edited by: Soichi Ueno
- Music by: Akira Senju
- Production companies: H Partners; Hinokio Film Venturer
- Distributed by: Shochiku; Movie Eye
- Release date: 9 July 2005 (Japan)
- Running time: 111 minutes
- Country: Japan
- Language: Japanese

Hinokio (Japanese: ヒノキオ), also known as Hinokio: Inter Galactic Love, is a 2005 Japanese science fiction film directed by Takahiko Akiyama and starring Masatoshi Nakamura, Kanata Hongo and Mikako Tabe.

== Overview ==
A recent accident has left Satoru Iwamoto, an elementary school student, temporarily needing a wheelchair. In addition, the recent loss of his mother has thrown Satoru into a reclusive state, locking himself from the outside world. However, in an effort to help Satoru recover from his injuries, his father, Kaoru, has designed a remote-controlled robot that will go to school in his place and allow him to interact with people and do normal things.

The robot, "piloted" by Satoru from a large control terminal in his room, is nicknamed 'Hinokio' by his classmates. Hinokio is mostly admired by his fellow students, and they together start a generally normal year of school. But the story soon dwells more on Satoru, himself, as he rediscovers love and friendship through classmate Jun Kudo and also his own father.

== Cast ==
- Masatoshi Nakamura - Kaoru Iwamoto
- Kanata Hongō - Satoru Iwamoto
- Mikako Tabe - Jun Kudo
- Maki Horikita - Eriko Akishima
- Ryoko Kobayashi - Sumire Takasaka
- Yuta Murakami - Jouichi Hosono
- Ryo Kato - Kenta Hirari
- Sachie Hara - Natsuko Fubuki
- Riho Makise - Yuko Sakagami
- Mieko Harada - Sayuri Iwamoto

== Theme song ==
- Yui - "Tomorrow's Way"
