= Midnight Food Store (Chinese TV series) =

- Promotional poster
- Genre: Drama; Slice-of-life
- Based on: Shinya Shokudō
- Directed by: Tsai Yueh-Hsun; Hu Hanqing
- Starring: Huang Lei
- Countries of origin: Taiwan; China
- Original language: Mandarin
- No. of episodes: 40

Original release
- Network: Beijing TV, Zhejiang TV
- Release: 12 June – 30 June 2017

Midnight Food Store (Chinese: 深夜食堂) is a 2017 Chinese television series adapted from the Japanese manga series Shinya Shokudō. A co-production between Mainland China and Taiwan, the series is directed by Taiwan's Tsai Yueh-Hsun and stars Huang Lei as the Master, and features numerous celebrities in cameo roles as guests. The series aired from 12 June to 30 June 2017 via Beijing TV and Zhejiang TV.

Unlike its predecessors, the series was widely panned by the audience and received a rating of 2.3, the lowest-ever rating for a television show on Douban. It was criticized for its rigid adaptation, failure to include Chinese elements, excessive product placement, and unrealistic characters and stories.

== Synopsis ==
The story follows a mysterious chef and his late night restaurant which open from midnight to dawn. There are no fixed items on his menu, but the Master will take orders from any customer and cook up whatever they ask for. As the Master cooks, his patrons tell him their life stories.

== Cast ==
- Huang Lei as Master

=== Patrons ===
- Mark Chao as Mark
- Janine Chang as Sun Kewei
- He Jiong
- Hai Qing
- Ivy Chen
- Ma Su
- Liu Haoran
- Jam Hsiao as Li Ang
- Richie Ren
- Qi Wei
- Liang Jing
- Cherrie Ying
- Xu Jiao
- Hu Bingqing as Xi Xi
- Wu Xin
- Wang Xun
- Chin Shih-chieh
- Kelly Niu Tien
- Yu Hsiao-hui
- Shawn Wei
- Ye Qing
- Xiu Jiekai
- Yedda Chen
- Song Yang
- Kan Qingzi
- Jason Tsou
- Zhang Wen
- Qian Yongchen
- Kirsten Ren
- Jiang Qilin
- Lu Qian
- Sui Yongliang
- Hong Chenying
- Yang Yitong
- Jia Jinghui
- Gao Feng
- Frederick Lee
- Shi Shi
- Guo Lin
- Zhu Yan Man Zi
- Zhang Ruihan
- Chi Jia
- Cai Lu
- Fang Jiayi
- Xu Wei
- Huang Haoyong
- Sun Yang
- Zhang Han
- Li Jiacheng
- Li Jiatong
- Xie Chengying
- Zhou Shuai
- Jiang Xueming
- Zhai Aohui
- Zhou Houan
- Guo Xin
- Xie Donghai
- Feng Ruoqi
- Xu Kaicheng
- Jian Zezheng
- Cai Fengze
- Heaven Hai

== Ratings ==
| Air date | Beijing TV CMS52 City ratings | | | Zhejiang TV CMS52 City ratings | | |
| Air date | Ratings (%) | Audience share (%) | Rank during its time slot | Ratings (%) | Audience share (%) | Rank during its time slot |
|---|---|---|---|---|---|---|
| 2017.6.12 | 0.653 | 2.22 | 5 | 0.48 | 1.639 | 8 |
| 2017.6.13 | 0.537 | 1.845 | 6 | 0.459 | 1.583 | 8 |
| 2017.6.14 | 0.553 | 1.92 | 6 | 0.442 | 1.54 | 9 |
| 2017.6.15 | 0.505 | 1.75 | 7 | 0.486 | 1.69 | 8 |
| 2017.6.16 | 0.565 | 1.99 | 5 | 0.512 | 1.8 | 6 |
| 2017.6.17 | 0.585 | 2.16 | 5 | 0.33 | 1.23 | 8 |
| 2017.6.18 | 0.551 | 1.91 | 7 | 0.38 | 1.32 | 9 |
| 2017.6.19 | 0.559 | 1.94 | 6 | 0.389 | 1.36 | 8 |
| 2017.6.20 | 0.561 | 1.98 | 6 | 0.453 | 1.6 | 8 |
| 2017.6.21 | 0.613 | 2.11 | 6 | 0.385 | 1.33 | 8 |
| 2017.6.22 | 0.537 | 1.84 | 5 | 0.367 | 1.28 | 8 |
| 2017.6.23 | 0.65 | 2.2 | 5 | 0.533 | 1.84 | 7 |
| 2017.6.24 | 0.54 | 1.93 | 5 | 0.413 | 1.5 | 7 |
| 2017.6.25 | 0.588 | 1.98 | 4 | 0.506 | 1.71 | 5 |
| 2017.6.26 | 0.597 | 2.10 | 4 | 0.44 | 1.56 | 7 |
| 2017.6.27 | 0.513 | 1.85 | 5 | 0.392 | 1.42 | 8 |
| 2017.6.28 | 0.513 | 1.84 | 5 | 0.368 | 1.32 | 8 |
| 2017.6.29 | 0.584 | 2.05 | 5 | 0.262 | 0.98 | 13 |
| 2017.6.30 | 0.579 | 1.95 | 5 | 0.549 | 1.88 | 6 |

- Highest ratings are marked in red, lowest ratings are marked in blue

== See also ==
- Midnight Diner
- Late Night Restaurant
