= Late Night Restaurant =

2015 South Korean television series

- Promotional poster
- Also known as: Midnight Diner
- Genre: Mystery; Slice of life; Food
- Based on: Shinya Shokudō by Yarō Abe
- Written by: Choi Dae-woong; Hong Yoon-hee
- Directed by: Hwang In-roe
- Starring: Kim Seung-woo
- Country of origin: South Korea
- Original language: Korean
- No. of episodes: 20

Production
- Executive producer: Park Young-soo
- Producers: Kim Dong-rae; Jo Jeong-ho; Baek Chung-hwa
- Running time: 30 minutes; Saturdays at 24:10/24:40 (KST)
- Production companies: BaramiBunda inc.; RaemongRaein Co. Ltd.; SBS Contents Hub

Original release
- Network: Seoul Broadcasting System
- Release: July 4 – September 5, 2015

Related
- Midnight Diner (2009); Midnight Diner (2017)

Late Night Restaurant (Korean: 심야식당; RR: Simyasikdang) is a 2015 South Korean drama series based on the manga Shinya Shokudō. It aired two back-to-back episodes on SBS on Saturdays at 24:10 and 24:40 from July 4 to September 5, 2015.

== Plot ==
A restaurant opens at midnight until seven in the morning. Its mysterious owner and chef, simply called the 'Master', has no fixed items on his menu, but will take orders from any customer and cook up whatever they ask for. As the Master cooks, his customers tell him their life stories.

== Cast ==
- Kim Seung-woo as Master

=== Regular customers ===
- Choi Jae-sung as Ryu
- Nam Tae-hyun as Min-woo
- Jung Han-hun as Mr. Kim
- Joo Won-sung as "Quack"
- Park Joon-myun as Yoo-mi, "Fat woman"
- Ban Min-jung as "Banquet noodles" (Noodle Sisters)
- Jang Hee-jung as "Mixed noodles" (Noodle Sisters)
- Son Hwa-ryung as "Radish noodles" (Noodle Sisters)
- Kang Seo-yeon as Cherry
- Son Sang-kyung as "Big guy"

=== Guest appearances ===
- Shim Hye-jin as Eun-soo (ep 2)
- Kang Doo as Jae-hee (ep 3)
- Ji Jin-hee as Young-shik (ep 4-5)
- Dokgo Young-jae as Gentleman Noh
- Oh Ji-ho as Sung-kyun (ep 7)
- Nam Ji-hyun as Hye-ri (ep 7)
- Lee Young-ha as Musician Noh
- Lee Young-beom as Food critic
- Jo Dong-hyuk as Yong-ryong
- Kang Ye-sol as Mi-young
- Han Bo-bae as Ji-hee
- Jo Jae-yoon as Kwang Jo (ep 11)
- Seo Woo as Doctor Hyo Jin (ep 12)
- Jeon So-min as Cha Hye Jin (ep 13)
- Kim Jung-tae as Director Song (ep 14)
- Lee Si-eon as Tae-soo (ep 16)
- Nam Gyu-ri as Mi Kyung (ep 16)
- Kim Roi-ha as Chul-min (ep 18)

== Episodes ==
All episodes are named after a certain form of food, most of them of Korean origin.

1. Seasoned Seaweed and Rice Cakes
2. Buckwheat Pancake
3. Mixed, Radish and Banquet Noodles
4. Short-Necked Clam Soup (Part 1)
5. Hamburg Steak (Part 2)
6. Steamed Spareribs and Kimchi
7. Ginseng Chicken Soup
8. Butter Rice
9. Grilled Short Rib Patties
10. Barley-Dried Corvina
11. Marinated Chicken Fried Rice
12. Chinese Plums
13. Canned Whelk
14. Candied Sweet Potato and Spicy Rice Cakes
15. Potato Ongshim Seaweed Soup
16. Oyster Sauce Mayo Ramen
17. Tortilla Half-moon Pizza
18. Grilled Flatfish
19. Stone Pot Jangjorim Bibimbap
20. A Fall Gizzard Shad Party
