= Lei cha =

Southern Chinese tea-based soup

- Traditional Chinese: 擂茶
- Simplified Chinese: 擂茶
- Pha̍k-fa-sṳ: lùi-chhà
Transcriptions
Standard Mandarin
- Hanyu Pinyin: léichá
Hakka
- Pha̍k-fa-sṳ: lùi-chhà

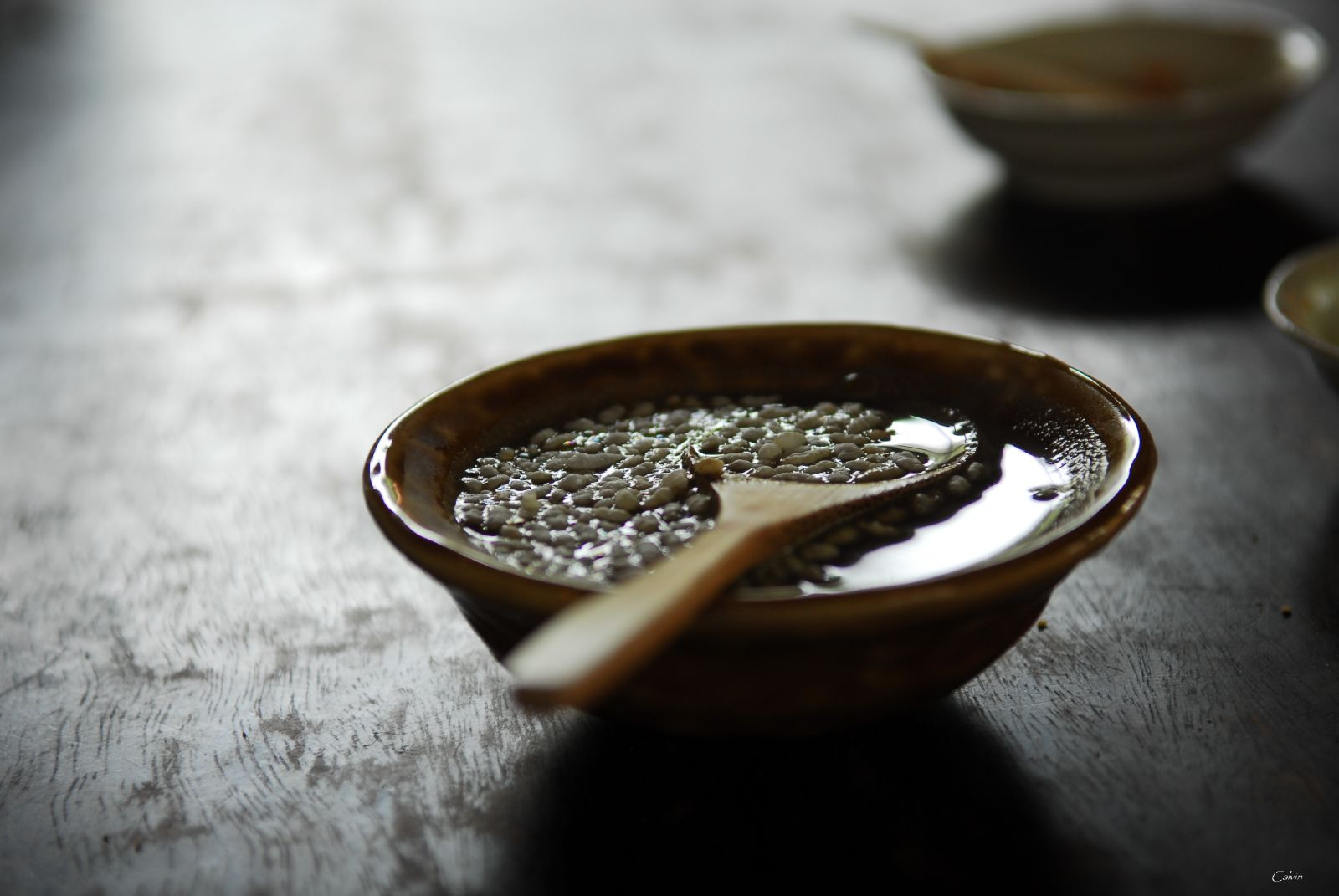
Hakka lei cha

Lei cha (Chinese: 擂茶; pinyin: léi chá; lit. 'pounded tea'; pronounced [lěɪ ʈʂʰǎ]) or ground tea is a Southern Chinese tea-based gruel in Hakka cuisine. It is often served with rice, vegetables, peanuts and other ingredients, forming a dish known as thunder tea rice.

== History ==
The custom of lei cha began in the Three Kingdoms period or even in the Han dynasty. It is very common among Hakka people in Hakka regions of Taiwan. It was brought by Hakka people to Taiwan, Indonesia, Malaysia, and any locales with a substantial Hakka diaspora population. Besides Hakka lei cha, lei cha is also traditional among Hunanese people in northern Hunan.

Lei cha is not the same as Taiwanese tea because there are always other ingredients. Ground tea consists of a mix of tea leaves and herbs that are ground together with various roasted nuts, seeds, grains, and flavorings.

== Production ==
Although lei cha can be bought commercially prepared and prepackaged, the drink is usually made "from scratch" immediately before consumption.

== Ingredients and preparation ==
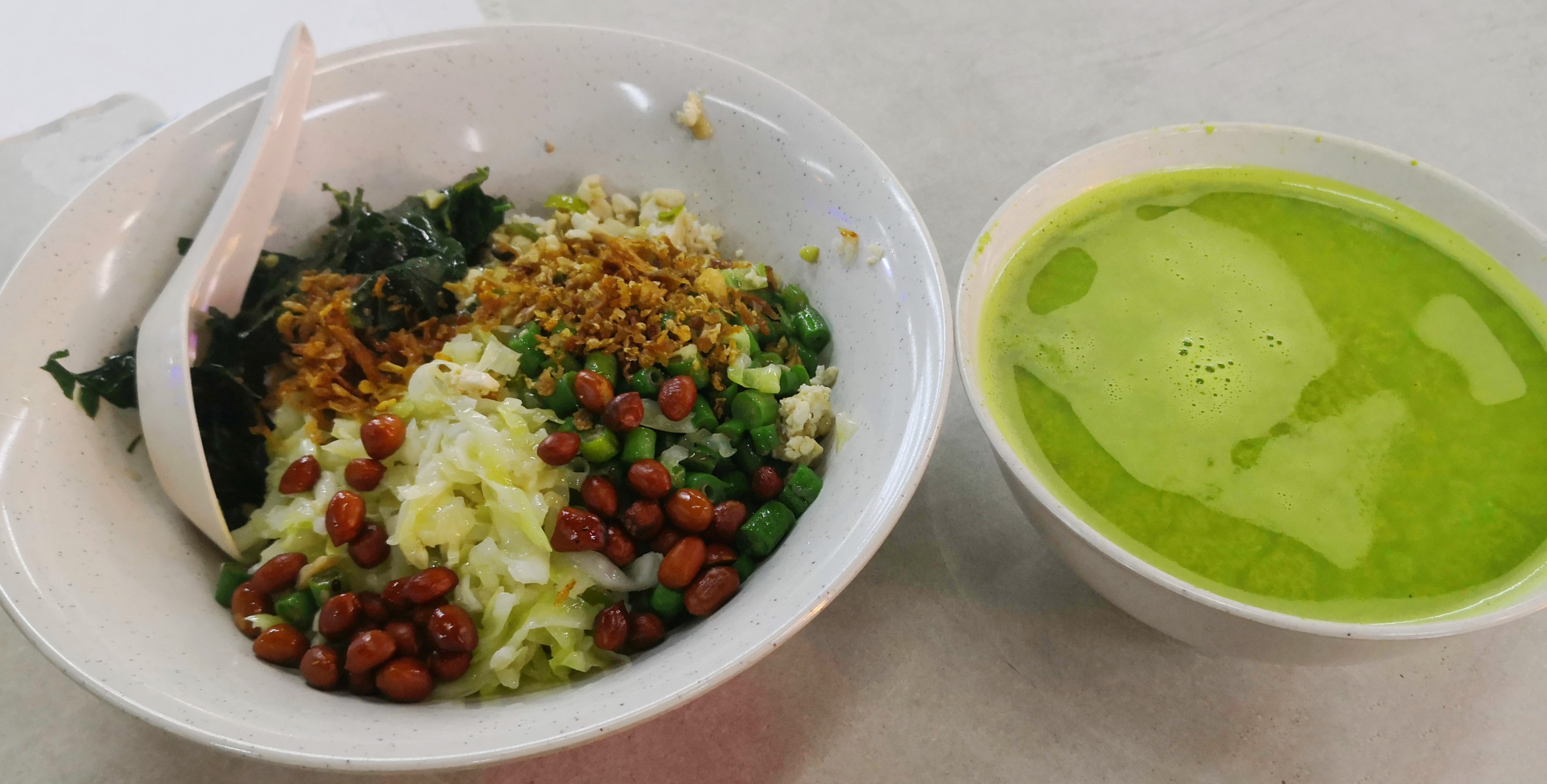
Lei cha (right) served with a bowl of rice and vegetarian toppings (left)

Ground tea is a varying mix of:

- Tea leaves – any type of tea leaf can be used, but the most popular and common are either green tea or oolong; for ease of use, sometimes matcha (finely milled green tea) is used
- Roasted nuts, legumes and seeds – the most commonly used are peanuts, mung beans, and sesame; other examples include soybeans, pine nuts, pumpkin seeds, sunflower seeds, lentils, and lotus seeds
- Roasted grains – examples: cooked or puffed rice, wheat
- Herbs and flavorings – examples: ginger, salt
- Chinese herbal medicine may be included for health purposes

The ingredients are ground to a powder the consistency of fine cornmeal in a food processor, with a mortar and pestle, or in a large earthenware basin with a wooden stick. The powder is placed into a serving bowl and hot water is stirred into it to produce a thin soup-like beverage.

== Consumption ==
Lei cha is a key component of thunder tea rice. The soup is served with a bowl of rice topped with mixed vegetables such as kailan, long beans, cabbage and turnips, as well as other ingredients such as peanuts, ikan bilis and tofu. Diners can choose to eat the rice and drink the soup separately or to pour the soup over the rice.

== See also ==
- Chazuke
- Hunan cuisine
- Taiwanese cuisine
