= Midnight Diner (Japanese TV series) =

Japanese television series

- Promotional poster
- Also known as: Shinya Shokudō
- Genre: Comedy; Slice of life Drama
- Based on: Shin'ya Shokudō by Yarō Abe
- Directed by: Joji Matsuoka; Nobuhiro Yamashita; Shotarou Kobayashi
- Starring: Kaoru Kobayashi
- Country of origin: Japan
- Original language: Japanese
- No. of seasons: 6
- No. of episodes: 60 (list of episodes)

Production
- Producers: Hitoshi Endo; Natsuko Mori; Takeshi Moriya; Shogo Ishizuka; Jun Takahashi
- Running time: 25 minutes

Original release
- Network: MBS
- Release: October 9, 2009 – December 22, 2014
- Network: Netflix
- Release: October 21, 2016 – December 23, 2026

Midnight Diner (深夜食堂, Shinya shokudō) is a Japanese TV anthology series based on the manga by Yarō Abe, Shin'ya Shokudō. It focuses on a late-night diner in the Shinjuku district of Tokyo, its mysterious chef known only as "Master," and the lives of his customers. It is directed by Joji Matsuoka.

== Storyline ==
Every episode starts with moving camera shot under a bridge to reveal Shinjuku, accompanied by a narration:

When people finish their day and hurry home, my day starts. My diner is open from midnight to seven in the morning. They call it "Midnight Diner". [cut to menu listing tonjiru, sake, beer and shōchū] That's all I have on my menu. But I make whatever customers request as long as I have the ingredients for it. That's my policy. Do I even have customers? More than you would expect.

The setting is a non-descript 12-seat diner in one of the many alleys of Shinjuku, open from midnight to 7 am. The "Master," the central character of the show, is the owner, chef, and bartender. Master refuses to cook any dishes that are beyond his skills or overly complicated. Sometimes, customers contribute the ingredients, particularly if they are out of the ordinary or a very specific craving. Master enforces a strict three-bottles-per-person alcohol policy, except on New Year's Eve when alcohol is free-flow. The diner is frequented by a range of customers, from salarymen to yakuza and prostitutes, all of whom generally get along well; only occasionally is there conflict between the characters while inside the diner, most of which are resolved shortly within the episode.

Generally, each episode deals with a drama focused on a particular customer. The plot introduces the characters of the episode, often using well-known archetypes and tropes, before detailing their personal challenges. Master, although generally reserved, offers help and advice. The plot generally offers a philosophical life lesson as part of the story, be it simple or complicated. The stories are usually lighthearted in tone, but some venture into more dramatic territory with melancholy resolutions.

Most episodes focus on a particular Japanese dish, often the favorite meal of the character the episode is about. The dish also relates in some way to the story, whether as a comfort, a nostalgic memory, or a metaphor for the subject character(s) life or situation. Once the main story concludes, every episode has Master giving a brief demonstration of how to prepare the dish to the audience while a character from the episode gives verbal instructions directly to the audience before credits. Master also occasionally breaks the fourth wall, to speak to the viewers, e.g., in the TV series, to announce the upcoming episode or to announce the end of a season. Master cooks everything by himself, requesting help only if he knows he cannot do something or if he is incapacitated. For example, in the first episode, Master is assisted by a homeless girl played by Mikako Tabe after he sustains an injury.

While the characters are largely transitional, and seen mainly in their own self-contained episodes, some are often seen as minor characters or cameos in one or two other episodes. Several characters are regular customers of the diner and appear regularly. A few stories adopt magic realism overtones, including supernatural elements, while others utilize montages and time skips to fully tell a character's story.

== Cast and characters ==
=== Leading character ===
- Master (Kaoru Kobayashi) – the only character to appear in every episode, Master's actual name is never given. He is a somewhat mysterious figure; well-regarded for his cooking prowess, his background is largely unknown. He has a visible scar down the left side of his face, implied in one episode to be from a sword attack in a past life. However, its origin is never properly explained. There is a subtle reference to his involvement with the Yakuza, which may simply stem from Master and the diner falling under Yakuza protection due to the friendship and patronage of Ryu Kenzaki (Yutaka Matsushige), a Yakuza boss. In Season 1, episode 1, in Master's initial interaction with Ryu and his underling Gen (Takashi Yamanaka), when Gen becomes aggressive about the menu, Master picks up his chef's knife and holds it behind his back until he believes the two are not a threat. At the end of Season 1, Episode 10, Katagiri (Joe Odagiri), a former high-profile casino kingpin, apologizes for the scar. He is generally sympathetic, despite the various problems his customers have, though he never gets too involved in their affairs. Generally, he is not directly involved in outside scenes with them, interacting only when they come to his diner. However, there is one episode where Master does venture outside of his diner (Season 1; Episode 10) to confront Gen in Kosuzu's (Toshiki Ayata) bar to turn himself in. Regardless his primary manner of assisting people is to bring them comfort by making food, and to provide advice. His character is similar to a bartender in that he functions as an adviser/therapist as the characters project their insecurities or issues onto him, or discuss and mull over their problems. Most of the time, he is seen cooking, washing dishes, or having a cigarette either in the diner or on the small balcony of his upstairs apartment. He has a few unwritten rules for the customers: There is a three-drink limit per person, as he does not run a bar; there is a three-toothpick limit as well (Season 3, Ep 4); and any arguments must be taken outside.

=== Regular customers ===
- Tadashi/Mr. Chu (Mansaku Fuwa): Frequently addressed as "Chu-san", he is the character in the show that most frequently appears (apart from Master). He is a cheerful older man, who is always seen wearing a blue cap. He occasionally offers advice and harmless banter to the other customers in the diner. Generally, the stories do not involve him, he instead sits in the diner to pass comment and reminisce about his youth.
- Kosuzu (Toshiki Ayata): A homosexual cross dresser who owns a successful restaurant/gay bar in the same neighborhood as the diner. Kosuzu is often seen dressed in eccentric outfits while at the same time chastising others for their appearance or behavior. He enjoys gossiping but is quick to defend his friends at the diner and his restaurant employees from scrutiny. He forms an unlikely friendship with Ryu. His favorite dish is rolled omelette.
- Ryu Kenzaki (Yutaka Matsushige): Yakuza boss Ryu stops by the diner randomly, always asking for Master to prepare dishes from his childhood. Ryu's storylines largely take place outside the diner and despite being a member of the Yakuza, the other customers worry about his well-being. Although a Yakuza member, he has occasionally shown a generous streak, such as negotiating with loan sharks to extend a deadline and reduce interest on an overdue loan taken out by one of the patrons. Nevertheless, he remains mostly reserved and aloof from the others. He forms an unlikely friendship with Kosuzu. He has a turbulent past with Detective Noguchi, with whom he was a schoolmate and a member of the same baseball team. His favorite dish is hot dogs cut to look like octopus.
- Detective Noguchi (Ken Mitsuishi): A diligent, by-the-book police detective, who visits the diner when he is on a case or to indulge in a specific craving. A baseball player in high school, Noguchi enjoys eating food from his youth that remind him of traveling during baseball tournaments. He has a turbulent past with Ryu Kenzaki, with whom he was a schoolmate and a member of the same baseball team. His favorite dish is stir-fried liver and chives.
- Komichi (Shohei Uno): An amateur photographer who takes photographs of the diner customers and occasionally has exhibitions in a local art gallery. He is a bit clueless when it comes to proper etiquette and he is often distracted by other characters so that he does not embarrass himself.
- The Ochazuke Sisters (Risa Sudo, Asako Kobayashi, Nahoko Yoshimito): Collectively called "The Ochazuke Sisters" by Master and other customers, Miki, Rumi, and Kana are three office ladies who go to the diner after a long day of work to unwind and gossip. Like Tadashi, they are generally not involved in the drama and are among the most frequently recurring characters. With bowls of ochazuke in hand, they offer commentary on the drama, being generally sympathetic to the involved parties whilst complaining that they are still unmarried. Respectively, their favorite ochazuke toppings are pickled plum (Miki), salmon (Rumi) and cod roe (Kana).
- Kanemoto (Kiyofumi Kaneko): A divorced alcoholic, Kanemoto works as a salaryman and comes to the diner because the other customers are the only people he enjoys interacting with. He is generally moody and carries a serious face, only becoming cheery when he gets to show off his intelligence or gets a new girlfriend.
- Katagiri (Joe Odagiri): A mysterious patron, he always sits in the back-corner of the diner closest to Master's kitchen area. He drinks sake and is frequently seen playing with food (namely peanuts and egg shells) before arranging them in neat rows. Unlike the other customers, Katagiri dresses in traditional Japanese clothing and speaks in cryptic, philosophical statements that are left open to interpretation. Typically, these statements involve a river of some sort and end with him saying "don't underestimate life." He has a special relationship with Master, as he is the only person with whom Katagiri converses normally.
- Kogure (Joe Odagiri): Only appears in seasons 3, 4, 5, and 6. He is a police officer who works in the neighborhood kōban with jurisdiction over the Master's diner as well as the neighboring shops and restaurants. He often hangs out with Detectives Izumi and Noguchi at the kōban, slurping ramen together. His cheerful, sociable personality contrasts with the reserved Noguchi and the unconventional Izumi.

=== Recurring characters ===
- Hachiro (Yuichiro Nakayama): A soft-spoken and idealistic man, Hachiro is usually seen disagreeing with The Ochazuke Sisters on important matters like love and money.
- Gen (Takashi Yamanaka): A member of the Yakuza, Gen is Ryu's loudmouthed junior. Despite making a bad first impression, Master and Gen grow to tolerate each other as Gen matures and begins taking his responsibilities both as a Yakuza and beyond more seriously. His favorite dish is simmered burdock.
- Jun (Yuko Genkaku): A bartender at Kosuzu's bar, Jun is a trans woman who often visits the diner with her timid boyfriend. They share a love of Natto.
- Mariko "Marilyn" Matsushima (Tamae Andô): Referred to as "Marilyn-chan", she is a popular stripper in Shinjuku and friend of Tadashi. She consistently has trouble establishing lasting relationships with men, and often laments her unmarried status alongside The Ochazuke Sisters. Her favorite dish is cabbage roll.
- Saya Adachi (Kaoru Hirata): A young woman who works as a clerk in a pachinko parlor. She frequents the diner, usually falling asleep before her food is ready. She gets along well with the other customers who care about her and protect her from people who try to take advantage of her innocence, such as her deadbeat boyfriend. Her favorite dish is karaage.
- Adachi-san (Tomomitsu Adachi): Saya's older brother who disapproves of her actions, but stills cares deeply about her. He is an accomplished martial artist, and often uses his skills in his job as a police officer.
- Ko (Yukihiro Yoshimi): One of Kosuzu's friends. Ko is transgender, and always asks for a "jumbo portion" when ordering at Master's diner. It is revealed that she was once the star of an old Super Sentai-style children's show, where she was discovered by another actor trying on the women's costumes in shame. They instead became friends, and Ko became more comfortable with herself.
- Kasumi (Mitsuki Tanimura): An Osaka native who moves to Tokyo in season 3. She visited Master's diner to enjoy his tempura, whereupon Komichi fell in love with her. Kasumi is always shown to be running around Shinjuku, yet no one knows what her job is. Her favorite dish is tempura pickled ginger, an Osakan specialty.
- Detective Izumi Natsuki (Yukiko Shinohara): Detective Noguchi's partner. Her unorthodox tactics are the complete opposite of his, leading to constant disagreement over the best course of action. She enjoys the company of both Master and Officer Kogure.

== Episodes ==
Series	Season	Episodes	Originally released		Network	Status
Series	Season	Episodes	First released	Last released	Network	Status
Midnight Diner	1	10	October 9, 2009	December 11, 2009	MBS	Released
Midnight Diner	2	10	October 14, 2011	December 16, 2011	MBS	Released
Midnight Diner	3	10	October 20, 2014	December 22, 2014	MBS	Released
Midnight Diner: Tokyo Stories	1	10	October 21, 2016	October 21, 2016	Netflix	Released
Midnight Diner: Tokyo Stories	2	10	October 31, 2019	October 31, 2019	Netflix	Released
Midnight Diner: Tokyo Stories	3	10	October 20, 2026	TBA	Netflix	Released

== Production ==
The show has been a success in Japan, with six seasons produced in 2009, 2011, 2014, 2016, 2019, and 2026. The fourth season (released as Midnight Diner: Tokyo Stories) was produced in 2016 by Netflix Japan. Netflix Japan purchased streaming and production rights from the original Japanese producers to produce the fourth, the fifth, and the sixth series, which are shown on Netflix internationally. The ten episodes of the fourth series were streamed on October 21, 2016. The ten episodes of the fifth series were simultaneously streamed on October 31, 2019. The sixth series premiered on October 20, 2026.

While the fourth and fifth seasons were released under the title Midnight Diner: Tokyo Stories, Netflix began streaming the first three seasons separately under the original title "Midnight Diner" in June 2020.

To date, two theatrical feature films were produced by TBS and MBS: Midnight Diner (2014) and Midnight Diner 2 (2016).

== International reception ==
In recommending the show The New Yorker compared Midnight Diner to Cheers and High Maintenance in the way it "finds whimsy in the mundane", adding that its "slow, meditative rhythms" discouraged binge-watching. The show has also been described as one of Netflix's "hidden gems".

== East Asian remakes ==
Following the success of the original Japanese version, Korean and Chinese versions were made. The Korean version, Late Night Restaurant, was mildly successful, and one season was made.

The Chinese television version, also called Midnight Diner, deviated significantly from the original and was poorly received. At the time of its release, it was the lowest rated TV show in Douban history.

A Chinese language film adaptation, directed by Tony Leung Ka-fai was released in 2019.
