= Hakka cuisine =

Ethnic cuisine of the Hakka people

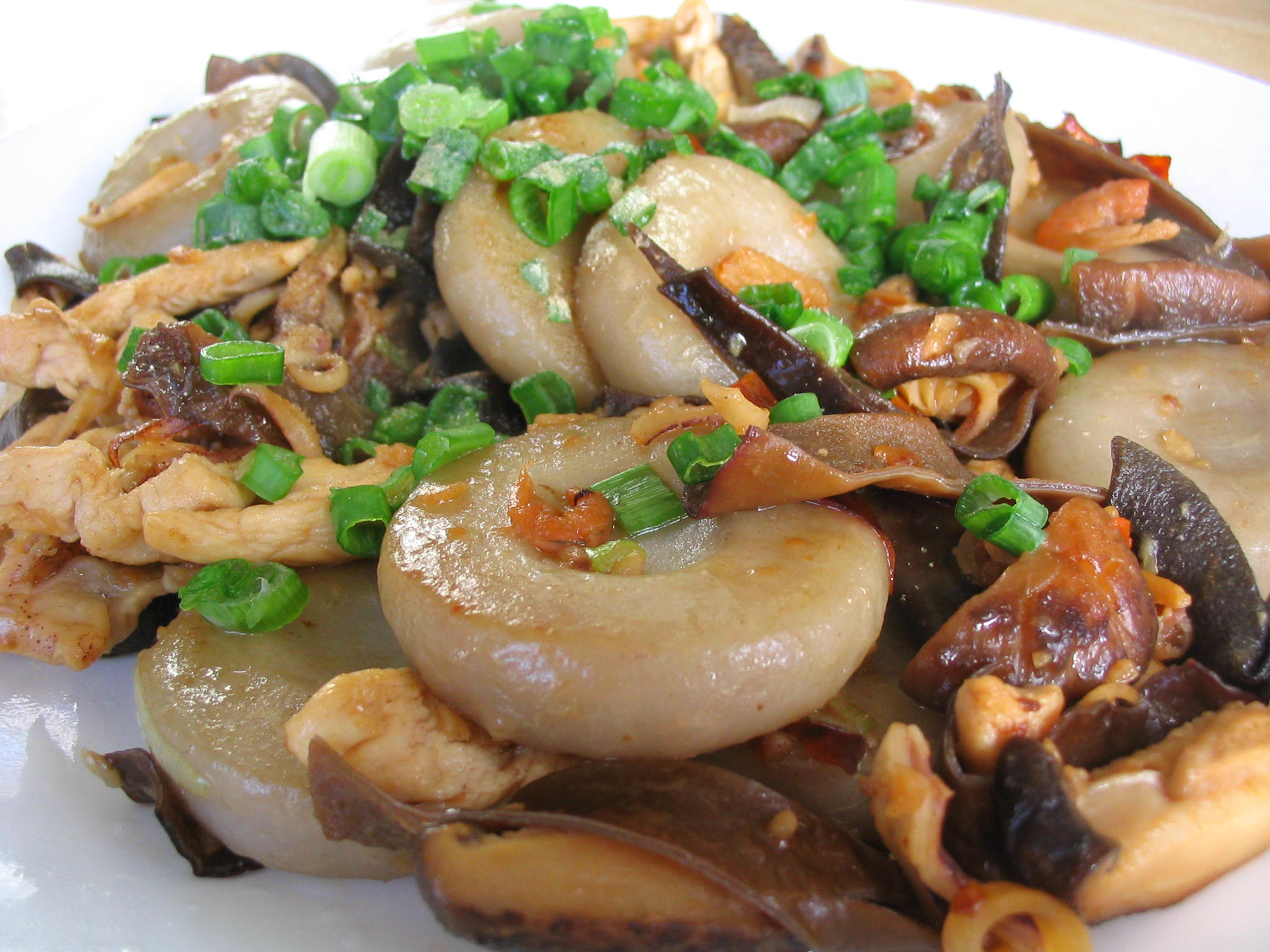
- Abacus beads (算盘子), a well-known Hakka dish
- Chinese: 客家菜
- Hakka: hagˋ gaˊ coi
Transcriptions
Standard Mandarin
- Hanyu Pinyin: Kèjiā cài
Hakka
- Romanization: hagˋ gaˊ coi
Yue: Cantonese
- Jyutping: Haak^{3} gaa^{1} coi^{3}

Alternative Chinese name
- Chinese: 客人菜
- Hakka: hagˋ nginˇ coi
Transcriptions
Standard Mandarin
- Hanyu Pinyin: Kèrén cài
Hakka
- Romanization: hagˋ nginˇ coi
Yue: Cantonese
- Jyutping: Haak^{3} jan^{4} coi^{3}
Southern Min
- Hokkien POJ: Kheh-lâng-chhài

Hakka cuisine is the cooking style of the Hakka people. It is found primarily in the Chinese provinces of Guangdong, Fujian, and Jiangxi, as well as parts of Taiwan and within countries with significant overseas Hakka communities. There are many restaurants in mainland China, Taiwan, Hong Kong, Indonesia, Malaysia, Singapore, and Thailand, as well as in the United States and Canada, that serve Hakka food. Hakka cuisine was listed in 2014 on the first Hong Kong Inventory of Intangible Cultural Heritage.

== Background ==
The Hakka people have a marked cuisine and style of Chinese cooking which is little known outside the Hakka home. It concentrates on the texture of food – the hallmark of Hakka cuisine. Whereas preserved meats feature in Hakka delicacy, stewed, braised, roast meats – 'texturized' contributions to the Hakka palate – have a central place in their repertoire. Preserved vegetables (梅菜) are commonly used for steamed and braised dishes such as steamed minced pork with preserved vegetables and braised pork with salted vegetables. In fact, the raw materials for Hakka food are no different from raw materials for any other type of regional Chinese cuisine where what is cooked depends on what is available in the market. Hakka cuisine may be described as outwardly simple but tasty. The skill in Hakka cuisine lies in the ability to cook meat thoroughly without hardening it, and to naturally bring out the proteinous flavor (umami taste) of meat.

The Hakka who settled in the harbor and port areas of Hong Kong placed great emphasis on seafood cuisine. Hakka cuisine in Hong Kong is less dominated by expensive meats; instead, emphasis is placed on an abundance of vegetables. Pragmatic and simple, Hakka cuisine is garnished lightly with sparse or little flavoring. Modern Hakka cooking in Hong Kong favors offal, an example being deep-fried intestines (炸大腸; zhá dà cháng). Others include tofu with preservatives, along with their signature dish, salt-baked chicken (鹽焗雞; yán jú jī). Another specialty is the poon choi (盆菜; pén cài). While it may be difficult to prove these were the actual diets of the old Hakka community, it is at present a commonly accepted view. The above dishes and their variations are in fact found and consumed throughout China, including Guangdong Province, and are not particularly unique or confined to the Hakka population.

Besides meat as source of protein, there is a unique vegan dish called lei cha (擂茶; léi chá). It comprises combinations of vegetables and beans. Although not specifically unique for all Hakka people but are definitely famous among the Hakka-Hopo families. This vegetable-based rice tea dish is gaining momentum in some multicultural countries like Malaysia. Cooking of this dish requires the help from other family members to complete all eight combinations. It helps foster the relationship between family members in return.

Steamed buns (包子) are a popular snack among the Hakka people, especially pork belly bao (扣肉包) that is stuffed with kiu nyuk. This bun is usually made with flour, water, sugar, and yeast, resulting in a soft, fluffy texture when steamed. Other varieties include a dumpling-like bun called tea fruit (茶果), made from glutinous rice. The sweet version is filled with sweetened black-eyed pea paste or peanuts, while the salty version contains preserved vegetables or radishes.

== Notable dishes ==
Hakka food also includes other traditional Taiwanese dishes, just as other Taiwanese ethnic groups do. Some of the more notable dishes in Hakka cuisine are listed as follow:

English	Image	Traditional Chinese	Simplified Chinese	Pinyin	Hakka	Description
Abacus seeds		算盤子	算盘子	suànpánzǐ	son panˇ ziiˋ	Made of dough formed from tapioca and yam, cut into abacus bead shapes, which when cooked, are soft on the outside and chewy on the inside. The dish may be cooked with minced chicken or pork, dried shrimps, mushrooms and various other vegetables. The dish is stir-fried, seasoned with light soy sauce, salt, sugar and sometimes rice wine or vinegar.
Beef meatball soup		牛肉丸湯	牛肉丸汤	níuròuwán tāng	ngiuˇ ngiugˋ ienˇ tongˊ	A simple, clear broth with lettuce and beef meatballs.
Braised pork trotter		燜豬腳	焖猪脚	mèn zhū jiǎo	munˊ zuˊ giogˋ	Pig's feet are simmered in broth with shiitake mushrooms, ginger, garlic, scallions, rock sugar, and spices such as star anise and clove, along with a mixture of dark soy sauce and oyster sauce.
Dongjiang salt-baked chicken		東江鹽焗雞	东江盐焗鸡	dōngjiāng yánjú jī	dungˊ gongˊ iamˇ giugˋ gieˊ	This dish was originally baked in a heap of hot salt, but many modern restaurants simply cook in brine, or cover it with a salty mixture before steaming it or baking it in an oven. The "Dongjiang" refers to the Dong River, which runs through eastern Guangdong Province. It is in the Hakka heartlands.
Duck stuffed with glutinous rice		糯米鴨	糯米鸭	nuòmǐ yā	no miˋ abˋ	The bones are removed from a whole duck with the shape of the bird maintained, and the cavities filled with seasoned sticky rice.
Fried pork with fermented tofu						This is a popular Lunar New Year offering which involves two stages of preparation. Marinated pork is deep fried to remove moisture so as to preserve it. The pork is then stewed with water and wood's ear fungus. It is a Hakka equivalent to canned soup.
Kiu nyuk		扣肉	扣肉	kòu ròu	kieu ngiugˋ	There are two versions of kiu nyuk, the most common consists of sliced pork with preserved mustard greens: thick slices of pork belly, with a layer of preserved mustard greens between each slice, are cooked and served in a dark sauce made up of soy sauce and sugar. Also called hong bak in some parts of Indonesia. The other version is cooked with yam or taro. Usually pork belly is used, for its layers of fat and meat. The yam and pork are shallow fried until browned before being steamed with five-spice powder and yellow rice wine. A variation of the recipe on Wikibooks Cookbook is available here.
Lei cha		擂茶	擂茶	lèi chá	luiˇ caˇ	An assortment of tea leaves (usually green tea), peanuts, mint leaves, sesame seeds, mung beans and other herbs) are pounded or ground into a fine powder and then mixed as a drink, or as a dietary brew to be taken with rice and other vegetarian side dishes such as greens, tofu and pickled radish.
Yong tau foo		釀豆腐	酿豆腐	niàng dòufǔ	ngiongˇ teu fu	One of the more popular dishes with deep Hakka origins, it consists of tofu cubes heaped with minced meat (usually pork), salted fish and herbs, and then fried until it produces a golden brown colour, or it can be braised. Variations include usage of various oddments, including eggplants, shiitake mushrooms, and bitter melon stuffed with the same meat paste. Traditionally, ngiong tew foo is served in a clear yellow bean stew along with the bitter melon and shiitake variants. Modern variations that are more commonly seen sold in food stalls are made by stuffing the tofu with solely fish paste. Usage of oddments to replace the tofu are more noticeable in this version, ranging from fried fish maw slices and okra to chili peppers.
Steamed sticky rice pastry		粢粑	粢粑	zī bā	qiˇ baˊ	Glutinous rice is ground into a paste, which is then steamed. After that, the dough is stirred with a bamboo stick and pounded with a pestle to enhance its stickiness. Once this process is complete, the mochi is shaped into small pieces and coated with sweet peanut powder.

== Hakka cuisine in other countries ==
=== South Asia ===
In India, Pakistan and other South Asian countries, there is something locally known as "Hakka cuisine." This variation of Chinese-style cuisine is, in reality, mostly Indian Chinese cuisine and Pakistani Chinese cuisine. It is called "Hakka cuisine" because, in India and areas of Pakistan, many owners of restaurants who serve this cuisine are of Hakka origin. Typical dishes include 'chilli chicken' and 'Dongbei (northeastern) chow mein/hakka noodles' (an Indian version of real Northeastern Chinese cuisine), and these restaurants also serve traditional South Asian dishes such as pakora. Being very popular in these areas, this style of cuisine is often mistakenly credited as being representative of Hakka cuisine in general, whereas the authentic style of Hakka cuisine is rarely known in these regions.

=== Thailand ===
In Thailand, Bangkok's Chinatown is Yaowarat and including neighboring areas such as Sampheng, Charoen Chai, Charoen Krung, Suan Mali, Phlapphla Chai or 22 July Circle. In the past, many Hakka restaurants are located in the Suan Mali near Bangkok Metropolitan Administration General Hospital. But now they had moved into many places, such as Talad Phlu, which is also one of the Chinatown as well.

=== Other ===
In Toronto, "Hakka Chinese food" almost universally refers to Indian-Chinese cuisine, not Hakka cuisine in general.

== See also ==
- Taiwanese cuisine
