= Chazuke =

Japanese dish

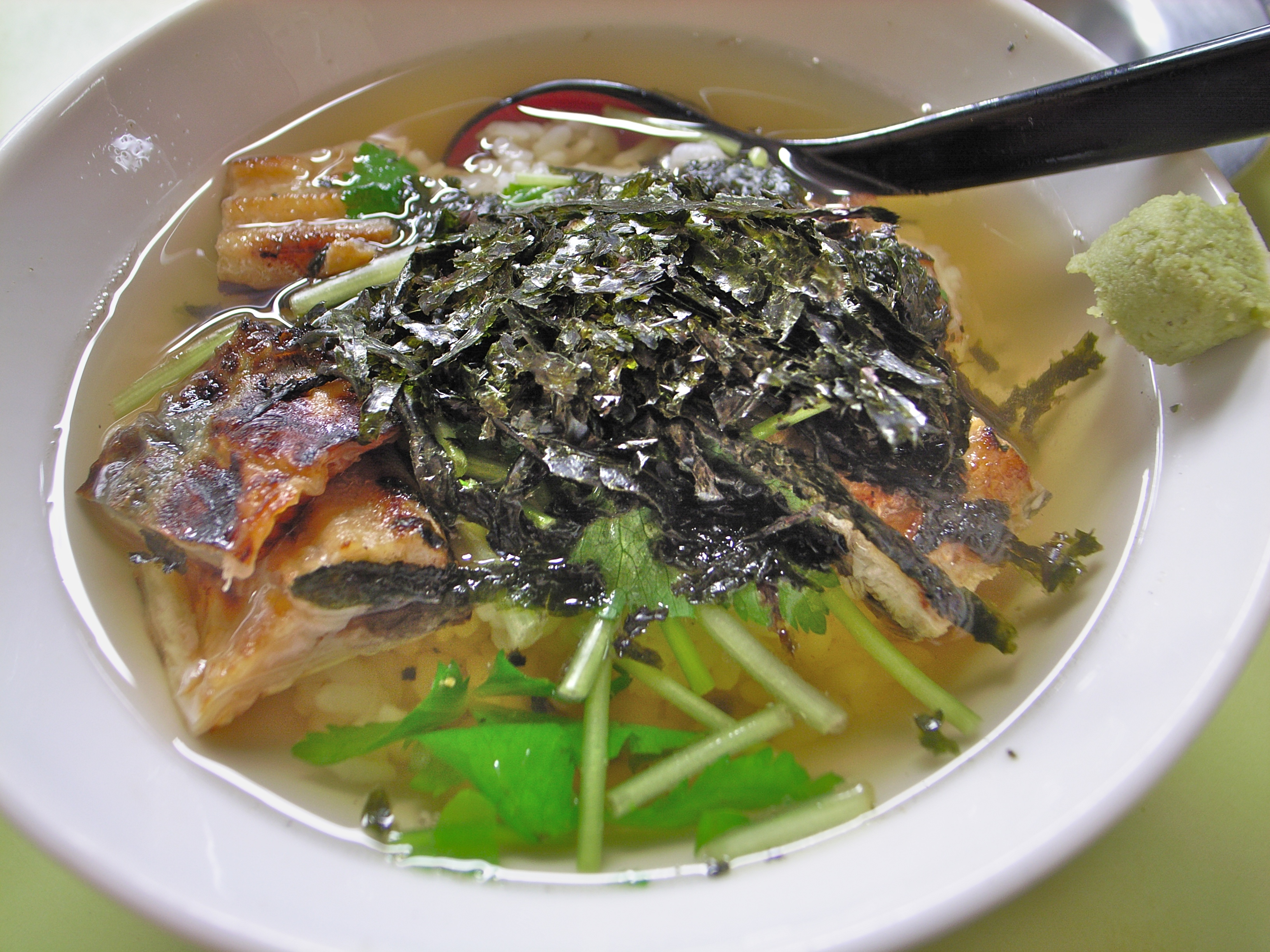
- Chazuke topped with unagi, nori and mitsuba
- Alternative names: ochazuke, cha-cha gohan, bubuzuke
- Place of origin: Japan
- Main ingredients: rice, green tea or dashi
- Variations: instant ochazuke

Chazuke (茶漬け, ちゃづけ) or ochazuke (お茶漬け, from (o)cha 'tea' + tsuke 'submerge') is a simple Japanese dish made by pouring green tea, dashi, or hot water over cooked rice. Toppings are often added; common toppings include furikake, nori (seaweed), sesame seeds, scallions, tsukemono (pickled vegetables), umeboshi (pickled plum), shiokara (pickled seafood), tarako (salted and marinated pollock roe), salted salmon, and wasabi.

Chazuke provides a way to use leftover rice as a quick snack because it is easy to make. In Kyoto, ochazuke is known as bubuzuke. Since the 1970s, packaged "instant ochazuke", consisting of freeze-dried toppings and seasonings, has become popular.

== History ==
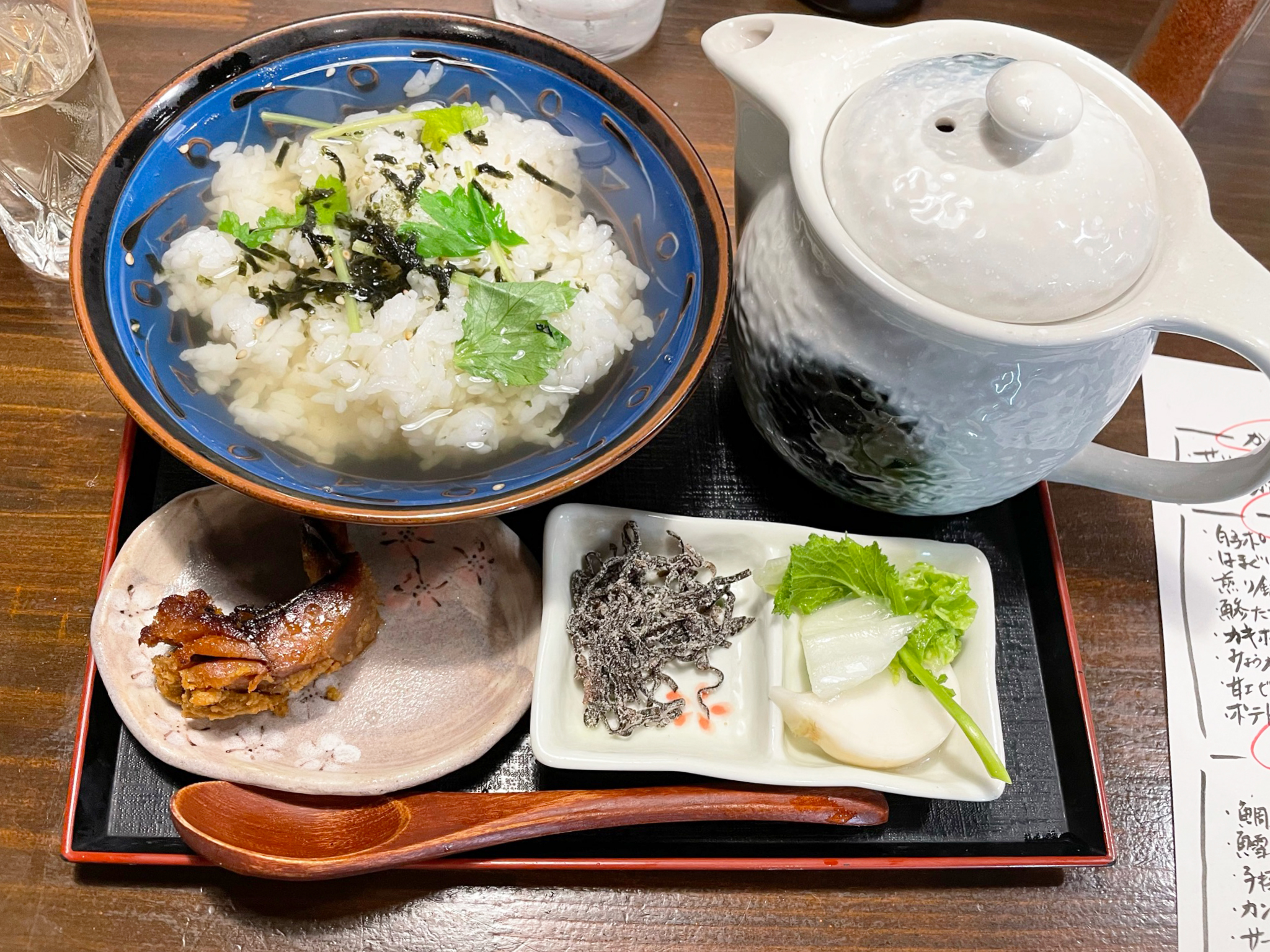
Chazuke with teapot and garnishes

This dish first became popular in the Heian period of Japan, when water was most commonly poured over rice, but beginning in the Edo period, green tea (particularly bancha and sencha) became a popular substitute due to its aroma and mild umami flavor.

It is said that the direct ancestor of today's chazuke is a method of eating that was adopted by servants (apprentices) who were employed by merchants at that time so that they could finish their meal very quickly during their work. At that time, the servants spent most of their day working, and their meal times were controlled by their superiors, so this form of eating naturally arose. Pickles were almost the only side dish that the apprentices were allowed to eat freely in the simple meals, and they were often piled up in huge bowls. Since there was still no technology to keep cooked rice warm as it is today, chazuke was a convenient way to enjoy cold rice and to finish a meal quickly.

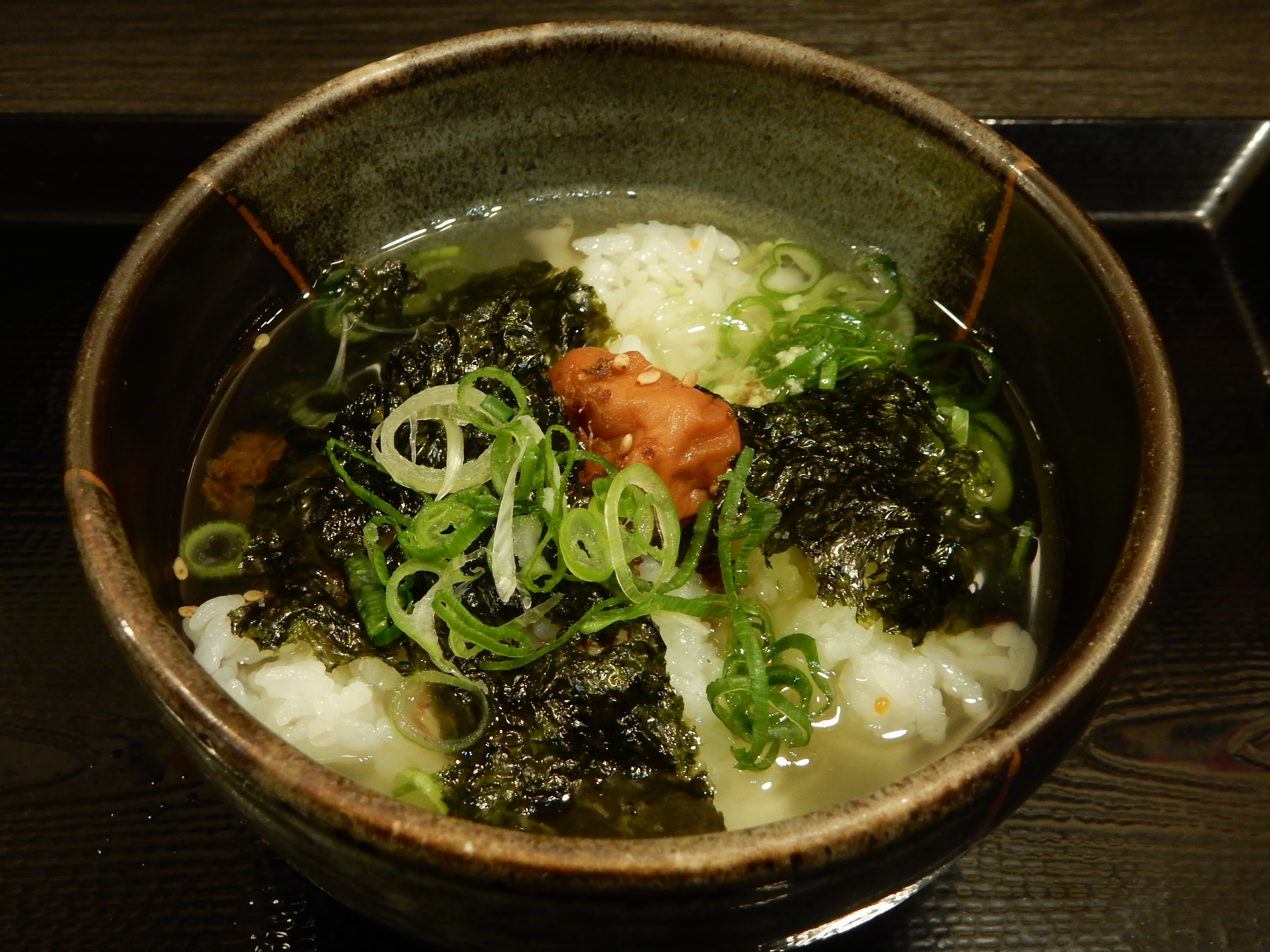
Chazuke with umeboshi (salted plum)

From the Genroku period, "chazukeya" appeared as restaurants serving chazuke, and they were widely popular as fast food for common people. The Edo Meisho Zue, a travel guide written in the late Edo period, mentions chazuke restaurants plainly, suggesting they were common at the time.

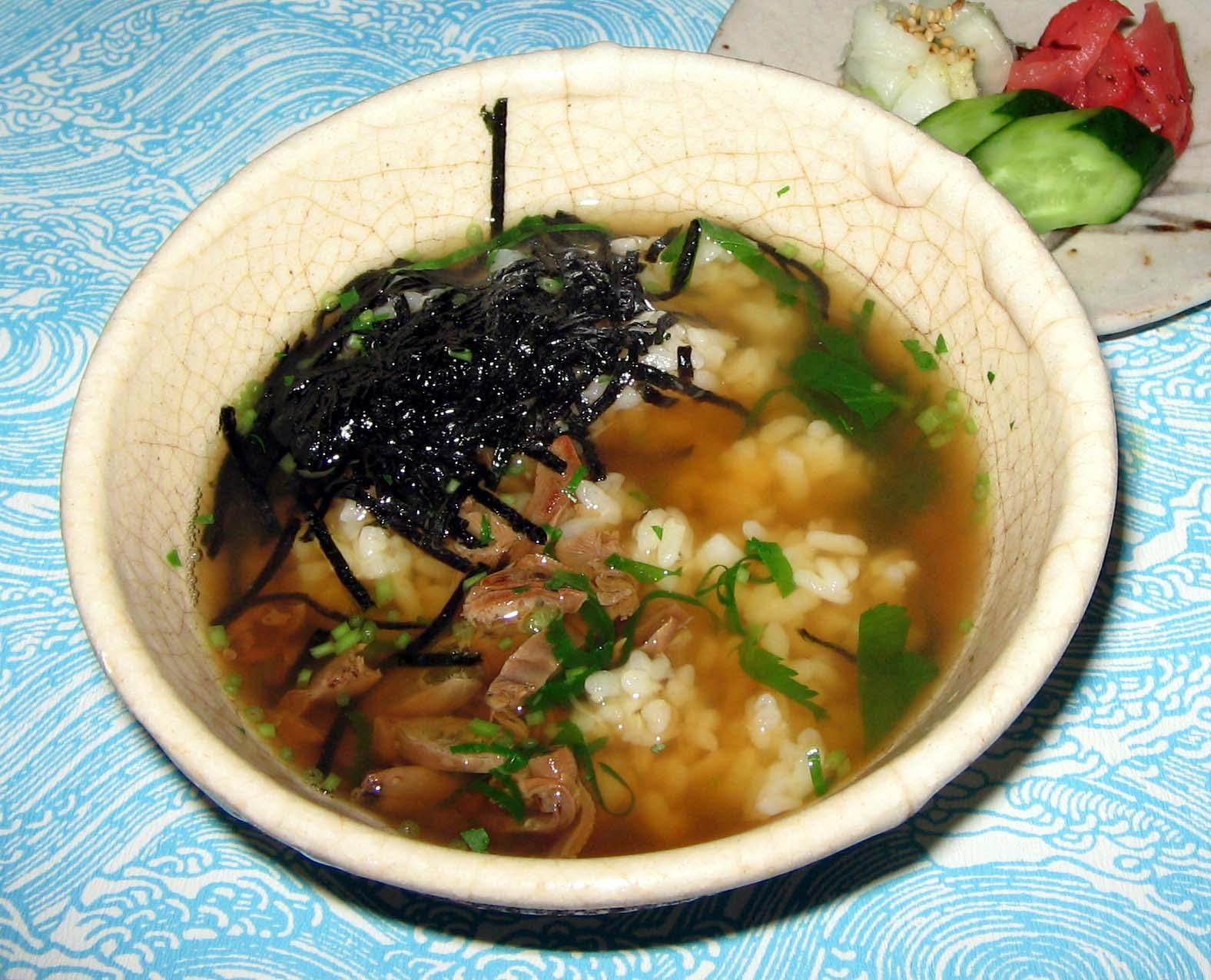
Chazuke with nori and hamaguri clams

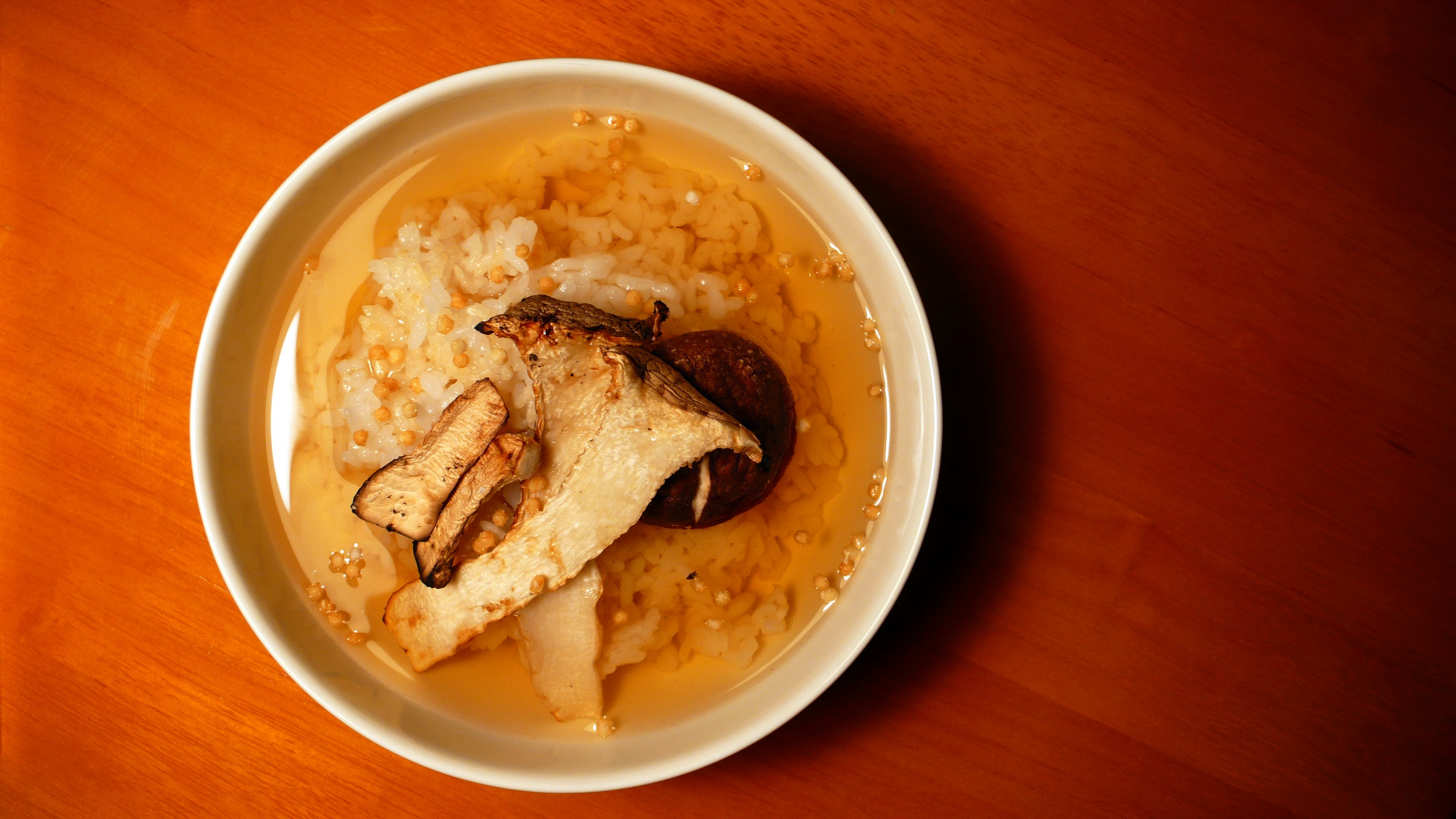
Chazuke with mushrooms

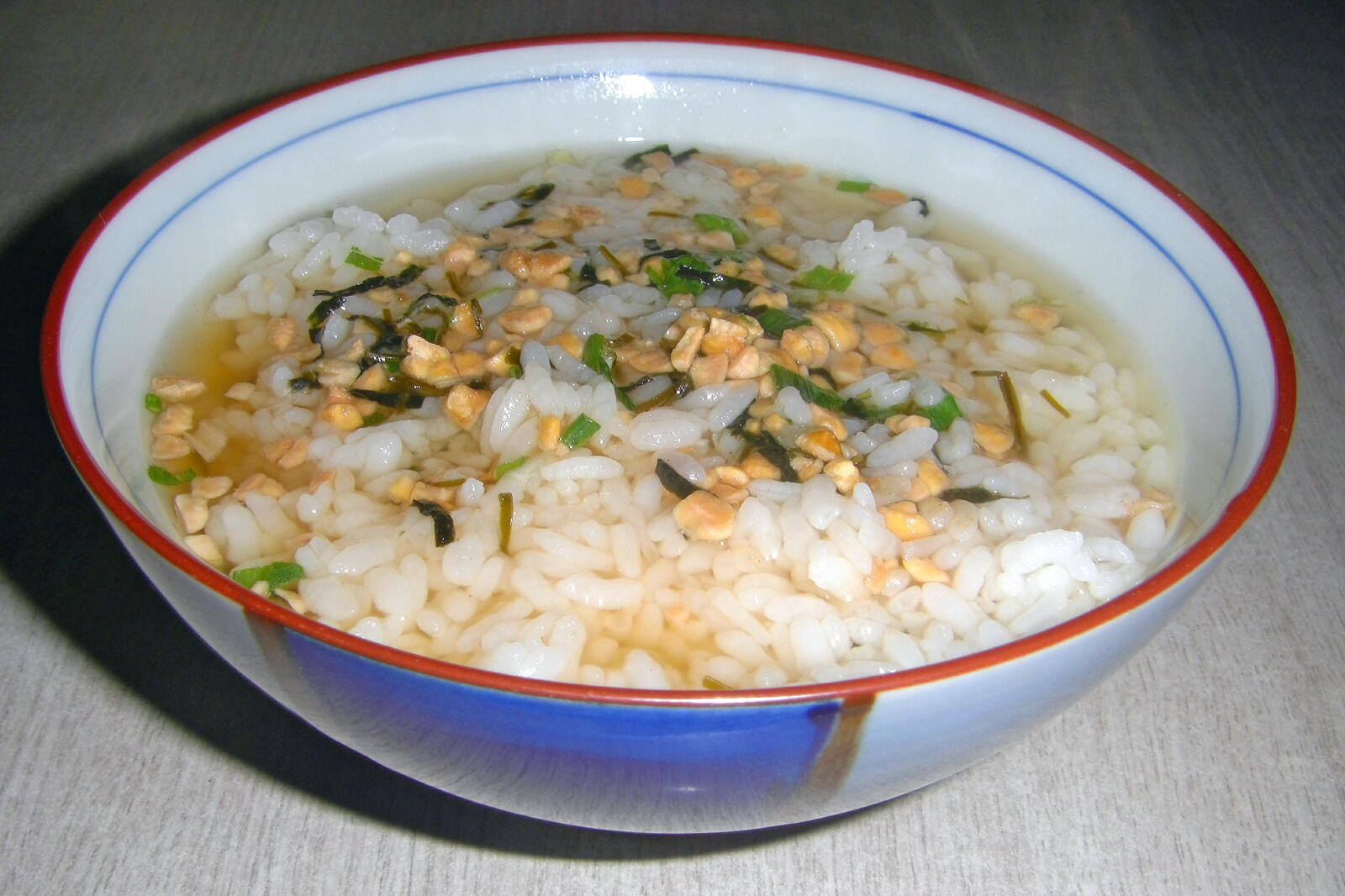
Chazuke with nattō

== See also ==
- Lei cha: a similar dish in Hakka cuisine
