= Shin'ya Shokudō =

Japanese manga series

- First volume cover

深夜食堂
- Genre: Cooking
- Manga
- Written by: Yarō Abe
- Published by: Shogakukan
- Imprint: Big Comics Special
- Magazine: Big Comic Original Zōkan (2006–2007); Big Comic Original (2007–present)
- Original run: October 12, 2006 – present
- Volumes: 31
- Live-action TV series
- Midnight Diner (Japan) (2009–2019); Late Night Restaurant (2015); Midnight Diner (China) (2017)
- icon

Shin'ya Shokudō (深夜食堂; lit. 'Midnight Diner'), is a Japanese manga series written and illustrated by Yarō Abe. It was serialized in Shogakukan's seinen manga magazine Big Comic Original Zōkan from October 2006 to August 2007, before being transferred to Big Comic Original in August 2007. Its chapters have been collected in 31 wide-ban volumes as of September 2026. It is about a late-night diner, open from midnight to dawn, and its eccentric patrons.

It was adapted into a Japanese television drama, directed by Joji Matsuoka and starring Kaoru Kobayashi as the Master, and ran for three seasons from 2009 to 2014. A live-action film premiered in 2015. Netflix Japan produced a fourth season and a second live-action film in 2016, a fifth season in 2019, and a sixth season in 2026. The series was also adapted into a Korean television series, titled Late Night Restaurant, in 2015, and a Chinese television series in 2017.

By October 2014, the manga had over 2.3 million copies in circulation. In 2010, it won the 55th Shogakukan Manga Award in the General category and the 39th Japan Cartoonist Award.

== Media ==
=== Manga ===
Written and illustrated by Yarō Abe, Shin'ya Shokudō was first serialized in Shogakukan's seinen manga magazine Big Comic Original Zōkan from October 12, 2006, (Note: It debuted in the November 2006 issue (cover date), released on October 12 of the same year.) to August 11, 2007. (Note: It finished in the September 2007 issue (cover date), released on August 11 of the same year.) It was later transferred to Big Comic Original on August 20, 2007. Shogakukan has collected its chapters into individual wide-ban volumes. The first volume was published on December 26, 2007. As of September 30, 2026, thirty-one volumes have been published.

==== Volumes ====
| No. | Japanese release date | Japanese ISBN |
|---|---|---|
| 1 | December 26, 2007 | 978-4-09-181707-5 |
| 2 | July 30, 2008 | 978-4-09-182160-7 |
| 3 | January 30, 2009 | 978-4-09-182447-9 |
| 4 | August 28, 2009 | 978-4-09-182686-2 |
| 5 | November 30, 2009 | 978-4-09-182800-2 |
| 6 | September 30, 2010 | 978-4-09-183470-6 |
| 7 | February 26, 2011 | 978-4-09-183750-9 |
| 8 | October 28, 2011 | 978-4-09-184211-4 |
| 9 | April 27, 2012 | 978-4-09-184429-3 |
| 10 | November 30, 2012 | 978-4-09-184825-3 |
| 11 | July 30, 2013 | 978-4-09-185468-1 |
| 12 | February 28, 2014 | 978-4-09-186085-9 |
| 13 | September 30, 2014 | 978-4-09-186506-9 |
| 14 | April 30, 2015 | 978-4-09-187082-7 |
| 15 | September 30, 2015 | 978-4-09-187296-8 |
| 16 | May 30, 2016 | 978-4-09-187697-3 |
| 17 | September 30, 2016 | 978-4-09-187847-2 |
| 18 | May 30, 2017 | 978-4-09-189577-6 |
| 19 | November 30, 2017 | 978-4-09-189747-3 |
| 20 | June 29, 2018 | 978-4-09-860018-2 |
| 21 | February 28, 2019 | 978-4-09-860237-7 |
| 22 | September 30, 2019 | 978-4-09-860434-0 |
| 23 | February 26, 2021 | 978-4-09-860666-5 |
| 24 | December 28, 2021 | 978-4-09-861219-2 |
| 25 | August 30, 2022 | 978-4-09-861430-1 |
| 26 | February 28, 2023 | 978-4-09-861634-3 |
| 27 | October 30, 2023 | 978-4-09-862635-9 |
| 28 | April 30, 2024 | 978-4-09-862814-8 |
| 29 | November 28, 2024 | 978-4-09-863140-7 |
| 30 | September 30, 2025 | 978-4-09-863598-6 |
| 31 | September 30, 2026 | 978-4-09-864102-4 |

=== Drama ===
==== Japanese television drama ====
A Japanese television drama was announced in August 2009, starring Kaoru Kobayashi as the Master. The series' first season ran for 10 episodes from October to December 2009 on MBS, TBS and other networks. A second season ran for 10 episodes from October to December 2011. A third season ran for 10 episodes from October to December 2014. A live-action film also premiered on January 31, 2015. In May 2016, Netflix announced that a 10-episode fourth season would premiere worldwide on October 21 of the same year. They also announced a second live-action film that premiered on November 5 of the same year. A 10-episode fifth season premiered on Netflix on October 31, 2019. A sixth season premiered on October 20, 2026.

==== Korean television drama ====
A Korean television drama, titled Late Night Restaurant, was broadcast in 2015.

==== Chinese television drama ====
A Chinese television drama was broadcast in 2017.

==== Chinese film ====
A Chinese film adaptation, unrelated to the Chinese television series, was directed by Tony Leung Ka-fai and released in 2019.

== Reception ==
By October 2014, the manga had over 2.3 million copies in circulation. The series ranked fifth on Takarajimasha's Kono Manga ga Sugoi! list of best manga of 2009 for male readers. In 2009, the manga was nominated for the second Manga Taishō. In 2010, it won the 55th Shogakukan Manga Award in the General category. The same year, the manga won the 39th Japan Cartoonist Award. The series won the Prix Asie de la Critique ACBD in 2017. It was nominated for the Best Comic award at the Angoulême International Comics Festival in 2018 and 2019.
