= Joji Matsuoka =

Japanese film director (born 1961)

Jōji Matsuoka
- Born: November 7, 1961 (age 64); Ichinomiya, Aichi, Japan
- Occupation: Film director

Jōji Matsuoka (松岡 錠司, Matsuoka Jōji; born November 7, 1961) is a Japanese film director. After studying filmmaking in the College of Art at Nihon University, he won an award for his independent short Inaka no hōsoku at the Pia Film Festival in 1984. He directed his first commercial feature, Bataashi kingyo, in 1990 and received a number of awards for best new director, including the Hochi Film Award. He won the Japan Academy Prize for best director for his film Tokyo Tower: Mom and Me, and Sometimes Dad. Matsuoka is known for his delicate depictions of complicated romantic and familial relationships, including a homosexual triangle in Kirakira Hikaru, a daughter caring for an abusive but now senile mother in Akashia no Michi, and a son caring for a cancer-stricken mother in Tokyo Tower. He has also shot many television commercials. His best known and most successful TV show is Midnight Diner.

== Director ==
=== Films ===
- Swimming Upstream (1990)
- Kirakira Hikaru (1992)
- Toire no Hanako-san (1995)
- Akashia no Michi (2001)
- Sayonara, Kuro (2003)
- Tokyo Tower: Mom and Me, and Sometimes Dad (2007)
- Kanki no Uta (2008)
- Snow Prince (2009)
- Midnight Diner (2014)
- Midnight Diner 2 (2016)

=== TV Dramas ===
- Midnight Diner (2009 - 2019)
