= Hannya =

Mask used in Japanese Noh theatre

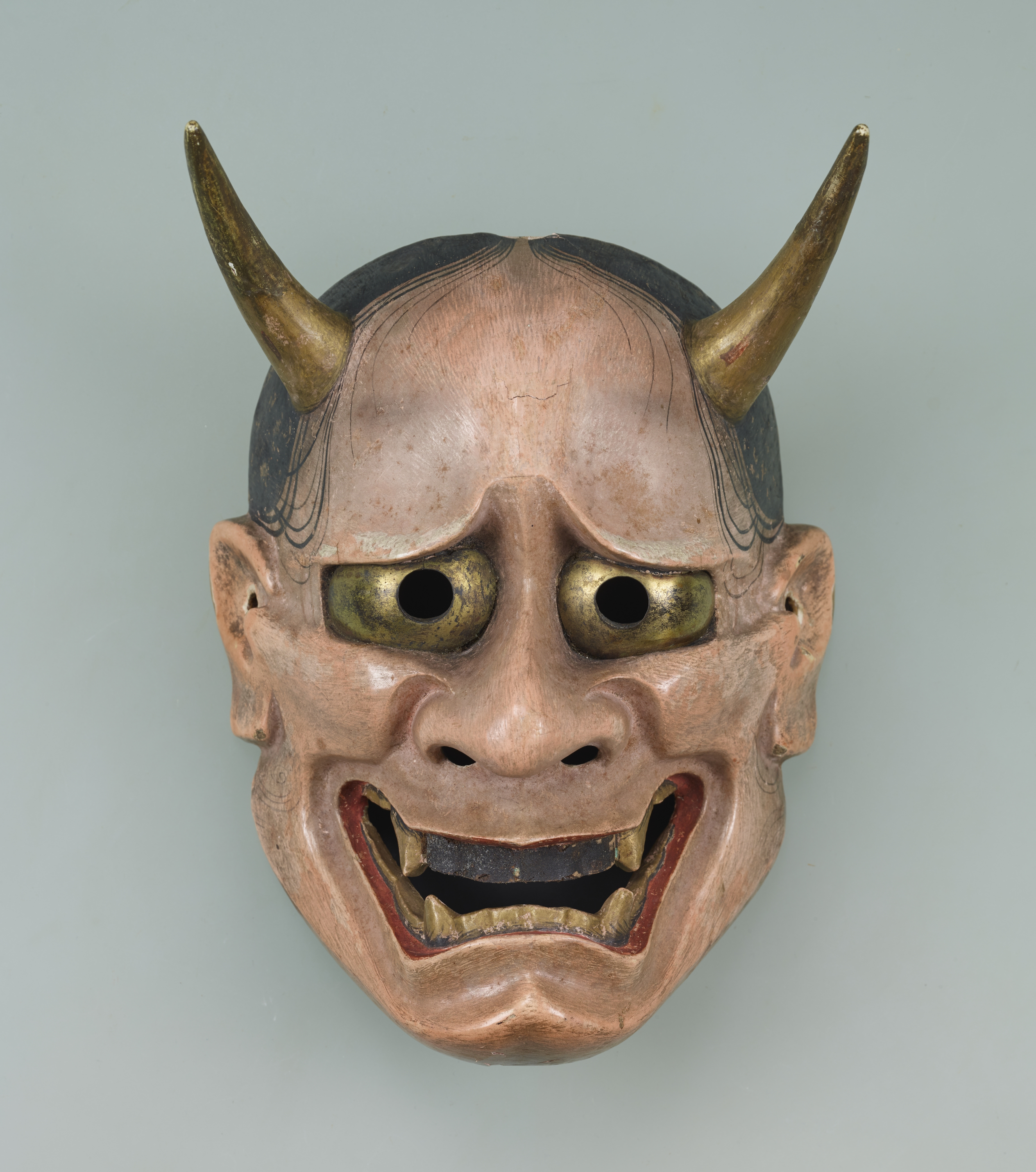
Wooden hannya mask at the Tokyo National Museum. Edo period, 1600s or 1700s. Important Cultural Property.

The hannya (般若) is a mask used in a traditional Japanese Noh theater, representing a jealous female demon. It is characterized by two sharp bull-like horns, metallic eyes, and a leering mouth. In Noh plays, the type of mask changes according to the degree of jealousy, resentment, and anger of the female characters. The hannya is a mask that represents a female onryō, even more resentful, jealous, and angry than the namanari (生成), a woman on the verge of becoming a demoness.

The hannya is also called chūnari (中成). The shinjya (真蛇), also called honnari (本成), is a mask that represents the appearance of a female onryō, even more intense than the hannya. These masks, which represent the jealousy, resentment, and anger of female demons, are classified as jya (蛇, snake) masks.

It is said that there are now more than 250 types of Noh masks, but the oldest historical record of Noh masks, Sarugaku dangi, mentions only about 14 types of masks, and the name hannya is not found among them. However, the Sarugaku dangi records a performance of the Noh play Aoi no Ue, and it is possible that snake-like demoness masks such as hannya were used.

The differentiation of mask types seems to have progressed in the 16th century, and the name hannya appears in the works of Shimoma Nakataka, a monk, samurai and Noh actor active from the 1580s to the 1610s.

== Etymology ==
The word hannya (般若) is a Japanese phonetic transcription of the Sanskrit word prajñā (प्रज्ञा), meaning 'wisdom'. There are several hypotheses as to why the mask used in Noh, which represents a vengeful spirit expressing female jealousy and resentment, was named hannya. According to the first hypothesis, the mask was named hannya because it is said to have been perfected by Hannya-bō (般若坊), a Japanese monk of the Bunmei era (1469–1487). The second hypothesis is that it was named after the line Ara osoroshi ya, hannya goe ya (あら恐ろしや般若声や, 'What a horrible voice reciting the Heart Sutra') in the Noh play Aoi no Ue. The hannya-goe in this line refers to the voice reciting the Heart Sutra, which repels evil spirits. An alternative explanation is that the artist would need a great deal of wisdom (hannya) in order to create this mask.

== Characteristics ==
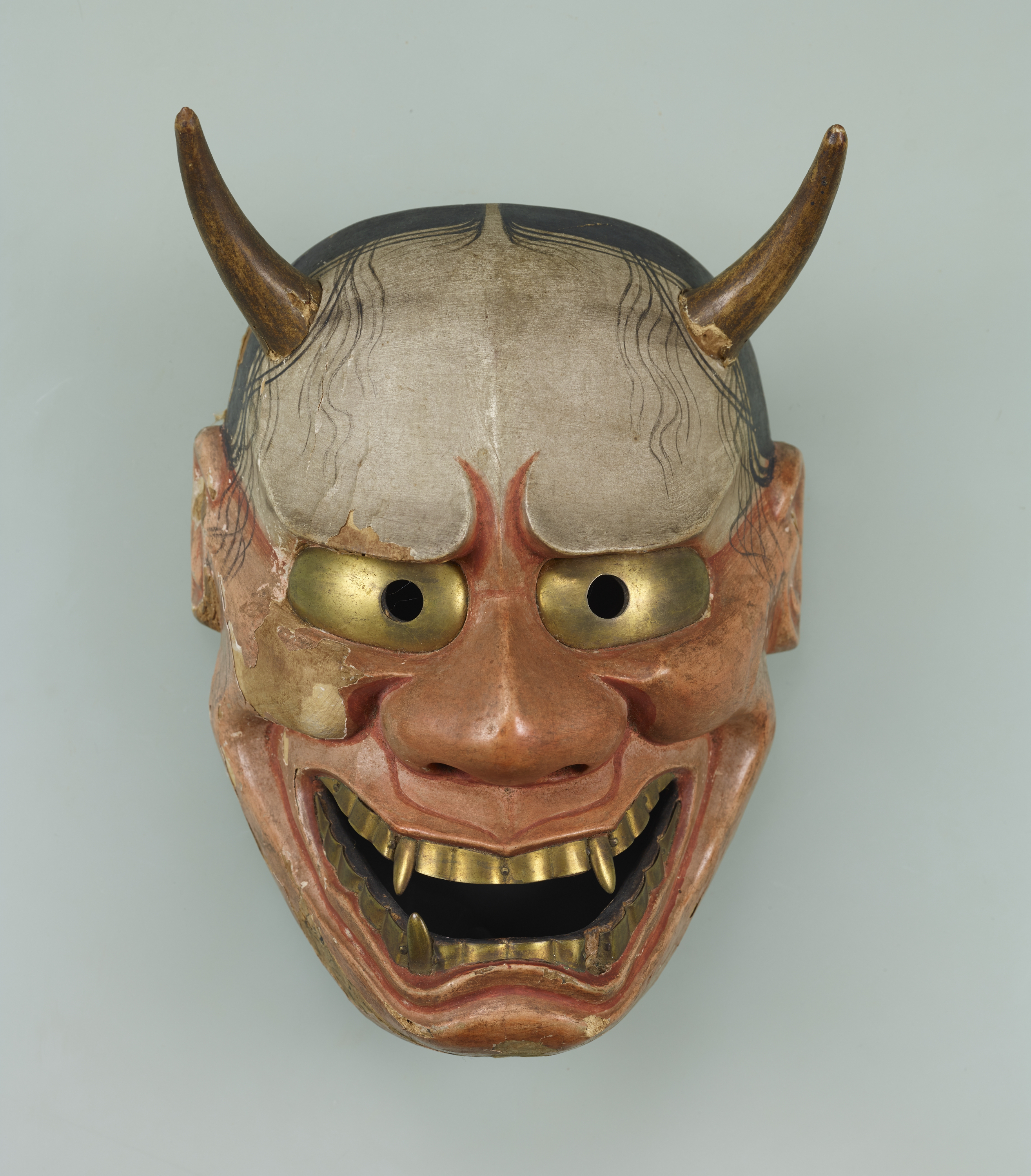
Wooden hannya mask at the Tokyo National Museum. By Hayashi Kihei. Edo period, 1800s. Important Cultural Property.

The hannya mask is used in many Noh and kyōgen plays, as well as in Shinto ritual kagura dances. The hannya mask portrays the souls of women who have become demons due to obsession or jealousy, similar to the Buddhist concept of a hungry ghost. Plays in which a person may wear the hannya mask include Aoi no Ue and Dōjōji; its use in these two plays, two of the most famous of the Noh repertoire, and its distinctive and frightening appearance make it one of the most recognizable Noh masks.

The hannya mask is said to be demonic and dangerous but also sorrowful and tormented, displaying the complexity of human emotions. When the actor looks straight ahead, the mask appears frightening and angry; when tilted slightly down, the face of the demon appears to be sorrowful, as though crying. The ability to change the expression of the mask through use of perspective is a feature commonly seen in Noh theatre.

Hannya masks appear in various skin tones: a white mask indicates a woman with a refined character (such as the aristocratic Lady Rokujō in Aoi no Ue), a red mask depicts a less refined character (like the spirit of peasant girl seen in Dōjōji), and the darkest red depicts true demons (revealed after appearing as women, as in Momijigari and Kurozuka).

== Plays associated with hannya ==
- Aoi no Ue – worn by the Lady Rokujō in her second-half appearance as a demon.
- Dōjōji – can be worn by the dancing woman in her second-half appearance as a snake, though the shinjya (真蛇) mask is also used.
- Genzai Shichimen – The story is about a woman who appears to Nichiren and reveals her true identity as a giant snake, but is transformed into a heavenly maiden by the Nichiren's recitation of sutras. In the scene where the serpent transforms into a heavenly maiden, shite appears wearing a woman's (tennyo) mask overlaid with hannya mask, and removes the hannya mask in the middle of the scene.
- Kanawa – the story of a woman who is divorced from her husband and becomes a demon, cursing him and his future wife, but is repelled by the prayers of Abe no Seimei.
- Kurozuka (known in the Kanze school as Adachigahara) – worn by the spinning woman of Adachigahara after she is revealed to be a demon.
- Momijigari – can be worn by the noblewoman after she is revealed to be a demon.
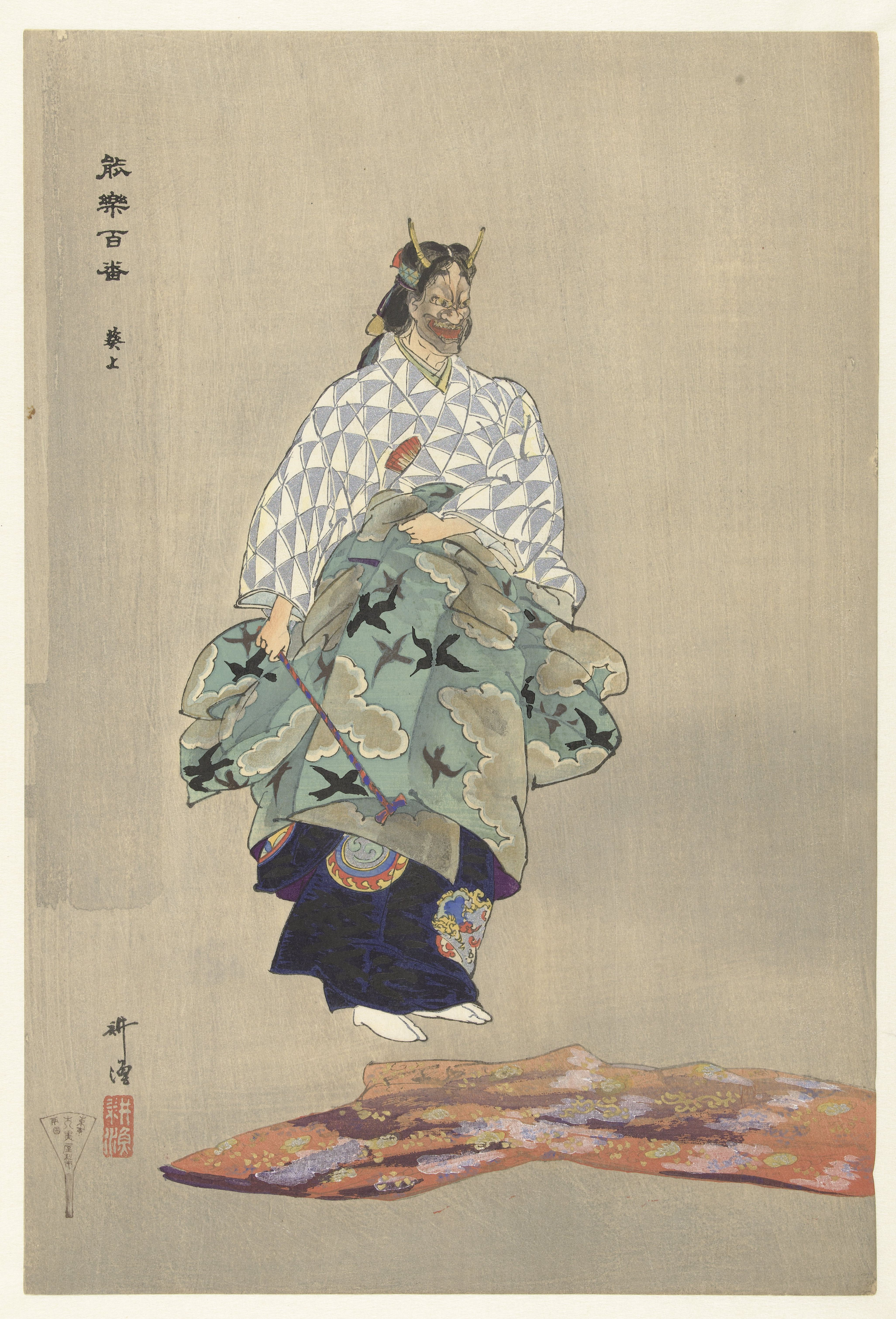
Aoi no Ue. Ukiyo-e print by Kōgyo Tsukioka.

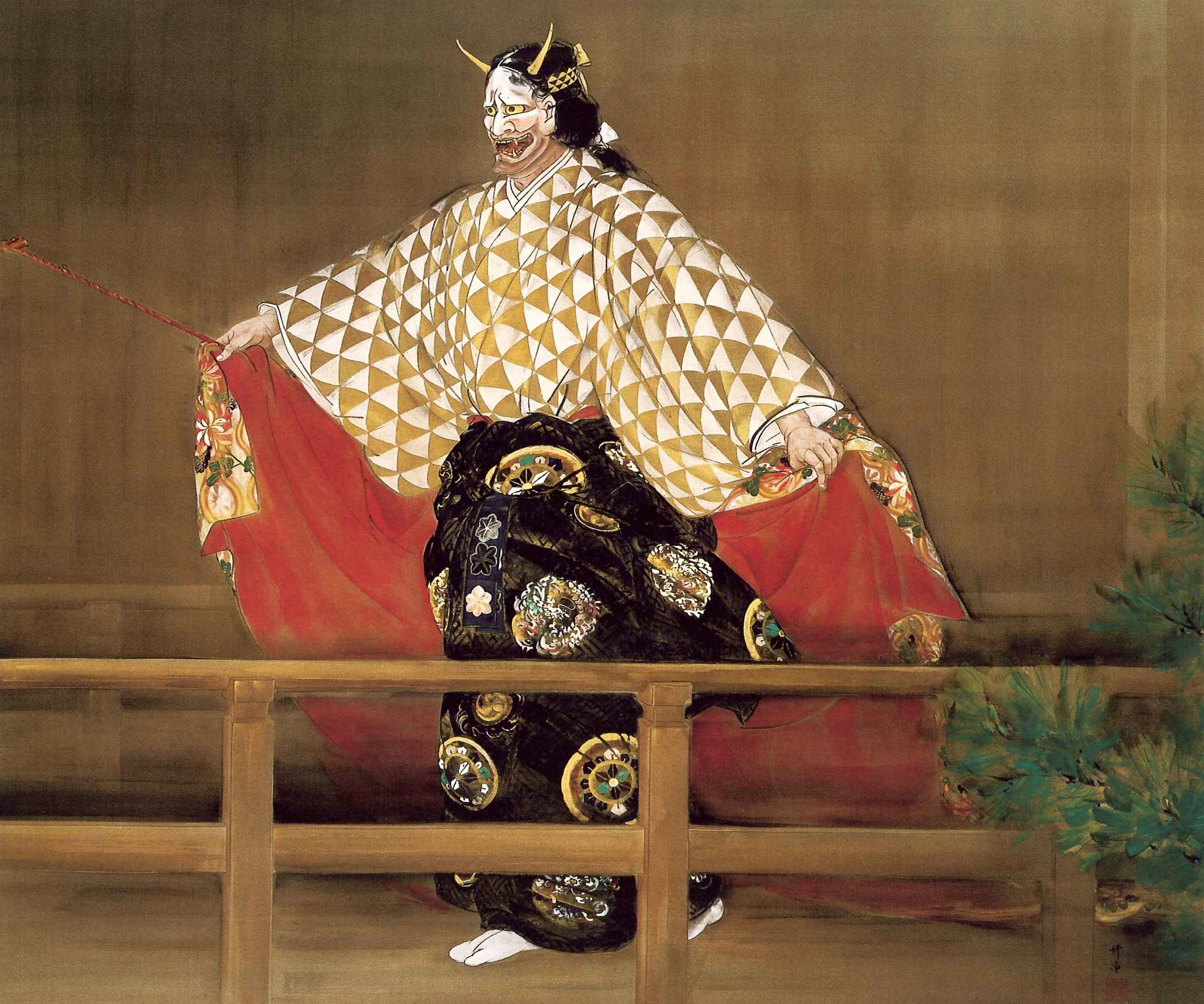
Dōjōji. Painted by Kōgyo Tsukioka.

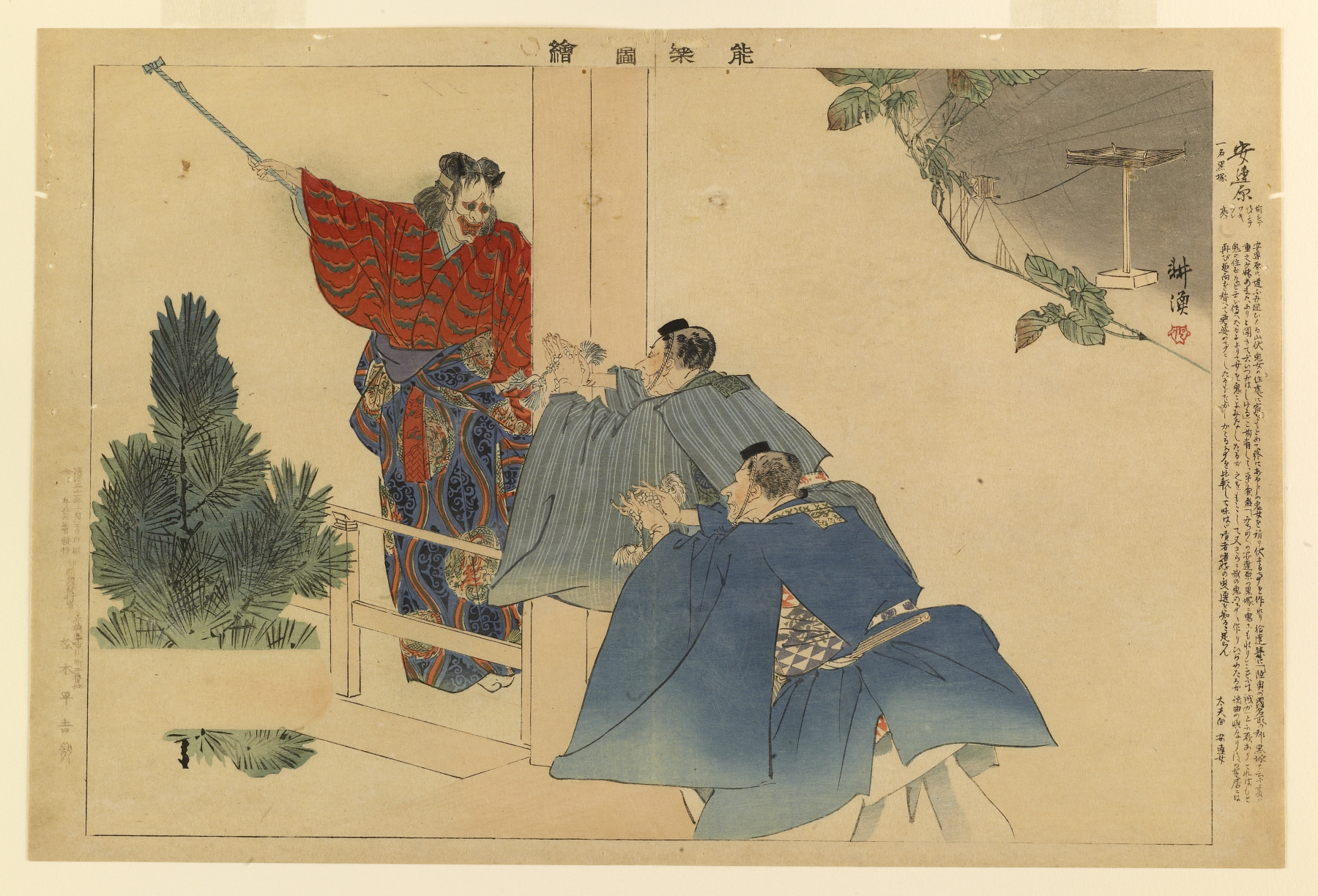
Kurozuka. Scene of confrontation between a demoness and two monks. Ukiyo-e print by Kōgyo Tsukioka.

== Masks similar to hannya ==
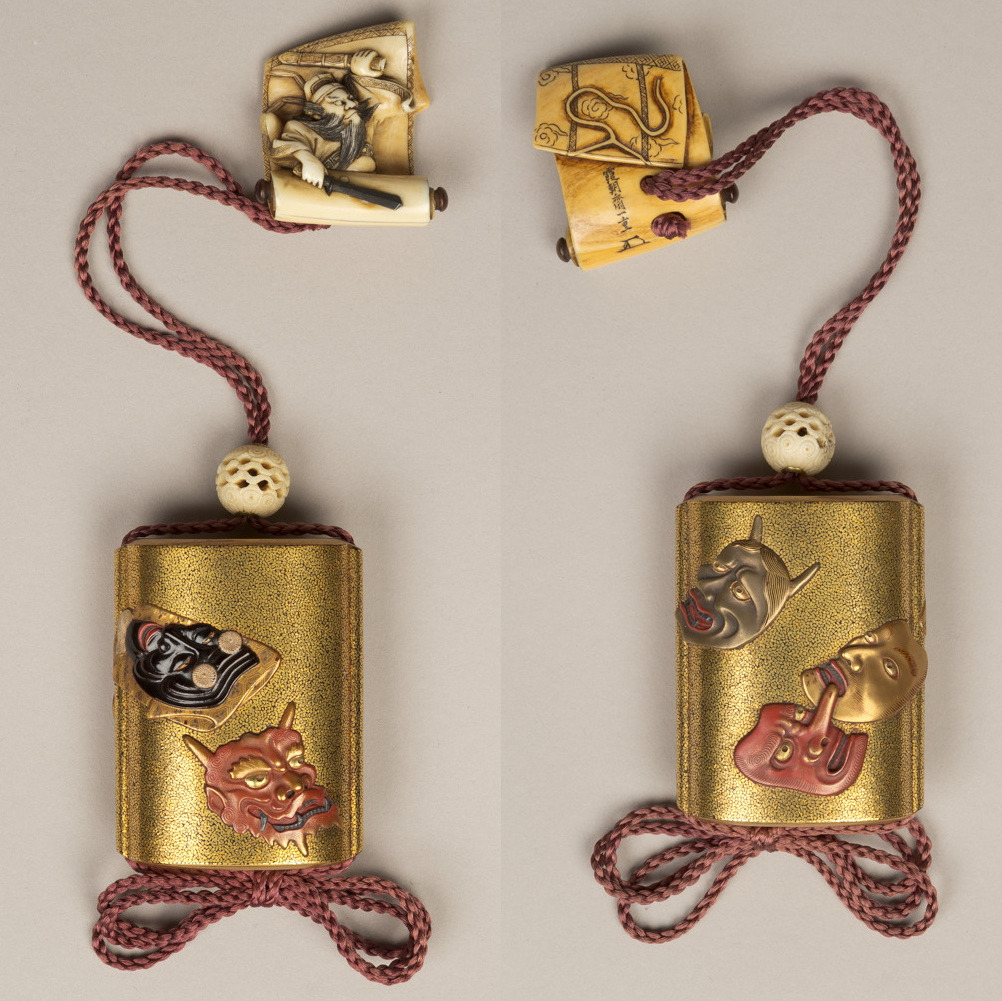
Inro with Noh masks. (front and back) Edo period, 1800s. The Metropolitan Museum of Art.

In Noh plays, the type of mask changes according to the degree of jealousy, resentment, and anger of the female characters.

The deigan (泥眼) and hashihime (橋姫) masks described below are each classified as a separate mask type, while the namanari (生成), hannya (般若), jya (蛇), and shinjya (真蛇) masks are classified as jya (蛇, snake) masks. The adachi onna (安達女) mask type is a type of hannya mask and is used exclusively in the Adachigahara (安達ヶ原) performance.

The deigan (泥眼) mask is a mask that represents the first stage of a woman's transformation into a demoness as her emotions begin to rise. The gold-painted eyes and tooth tips on the masks indicate that the women have already begun the transformation from human to onryō (怨霊, vengeful spirit) or ikiryō (生霊, disembodied spirit). It is used in the Noh plays Kanawa and Aoi no Ue. The deigan mask is also used as a mask that is not associated with a woman's resentment, jealousy, or anger, but simply represents that she has gone from human to supernatural beings. For example, in the Ama (海士) and Taema (当麻) performances, the mask is used to represent a woman who has become a dragoness or a bodhisattva.

The hashihime (橋姫) mask is painted red from the eyes down, and has more disheveled hair and more prominent golden eyes than the deigan mask. These features of the mask indicate that the woman has a strong desire for revenge. It is used in the Noh plays Kanawa and Hashihime.

The namanari (生成) mask represents a woman in the process of becoming a demoness, with short horns sprouting from both sides of her forehead. Compared to the hannya, the namanari mask represents the psychological state of a woman who is still emotionally attached to her husband. Namanari is used exclusively as a mask for the Noh play Kanawa.

The mask that represents a woman who has become a demoness is hannya, and hannya is also called chūnari or nakanari (中成) in contrast to namanari.

The mask that represents a demoness who becomes even more furious and looks like a snake is a jya (蛇), meaning 'snake', and the one that is even more furious is shinjya (真蛇), meaning 'true snake'. These masks are sometimes called honnari (本成) in contrast to namanari and chūnari. The masks of jya and shinjya have tongues peeking out of their mouths, and some masks have no ears, making them look more like snakes than humans. In Buddhism, a person who hindered enlightenment was sometimes likened to a poisonous snake. While women, unlike men, were regarded as beings incapable of attaining enlightenment, they were often likened to demoness or poisonous or evil snakes, and when their desires were not satisfied, they were believed to kill people in order to take revenge. In some schools, jya or shinjya is used as an alternative mask to hannya in Dōjōji.

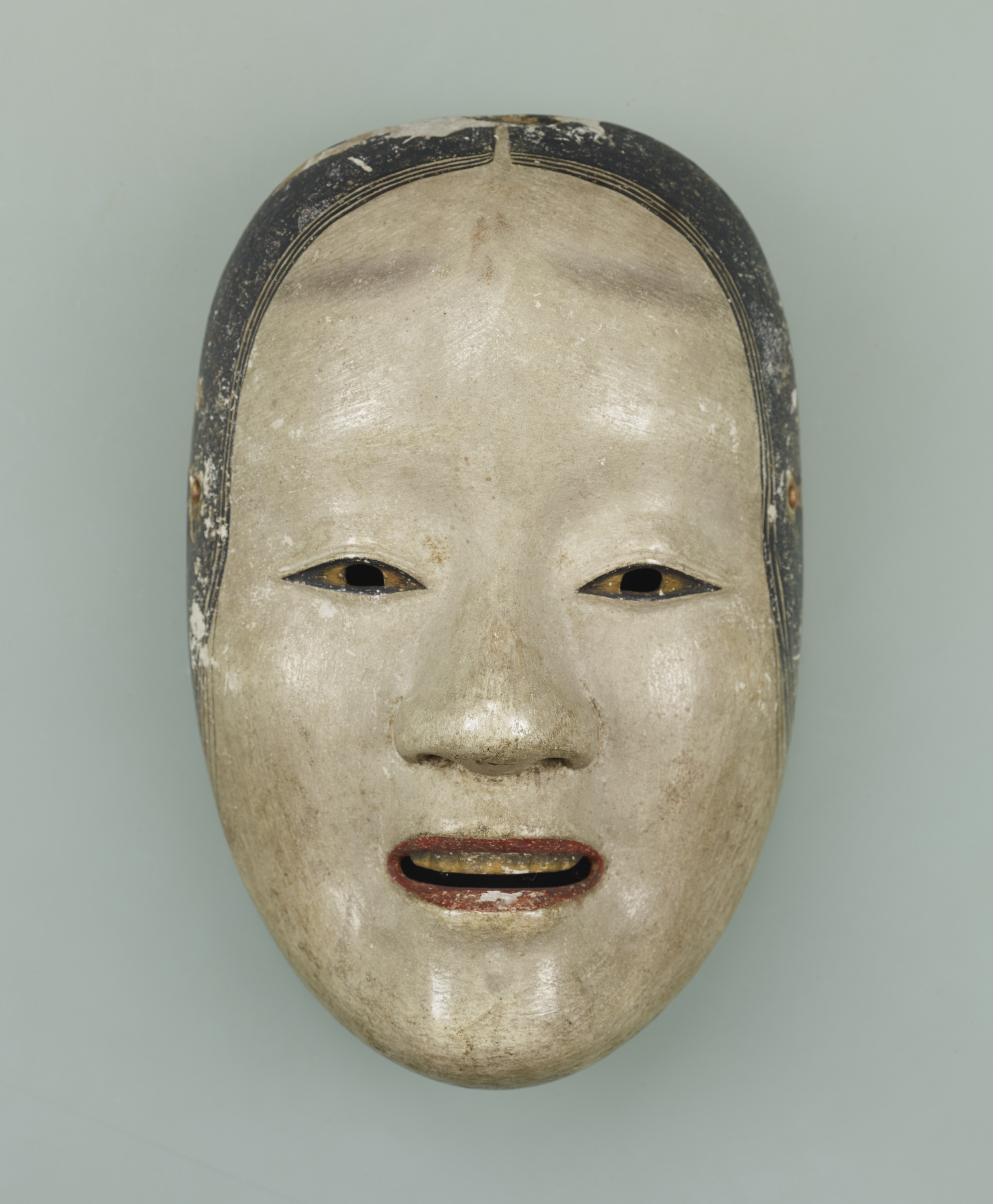
Deigan mask at the Tokyo National Museum. Edo period, 1600s. Important Cultural Property.

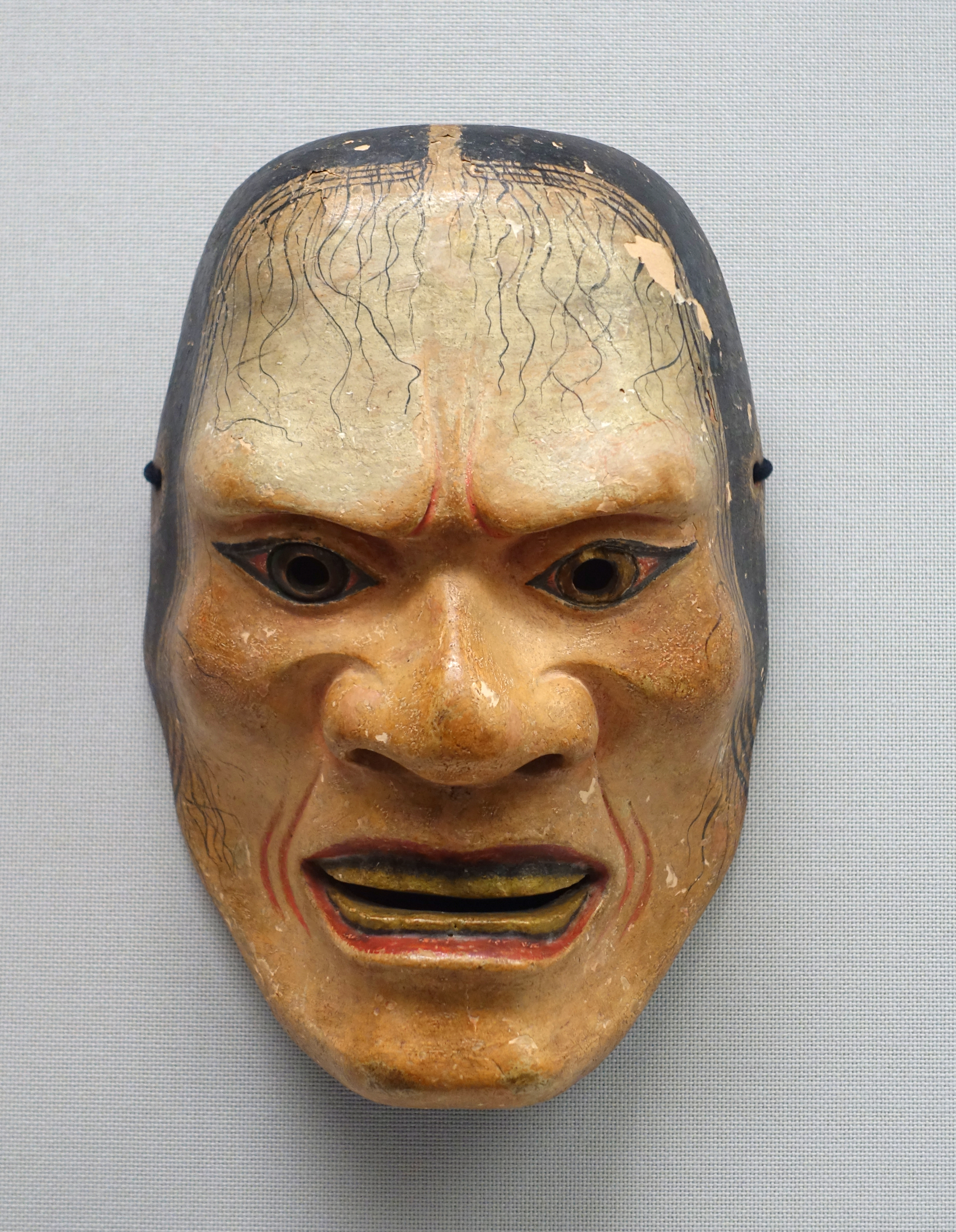
Hashihime mask at the Tokyo National Museum. Edo period, 1600s.

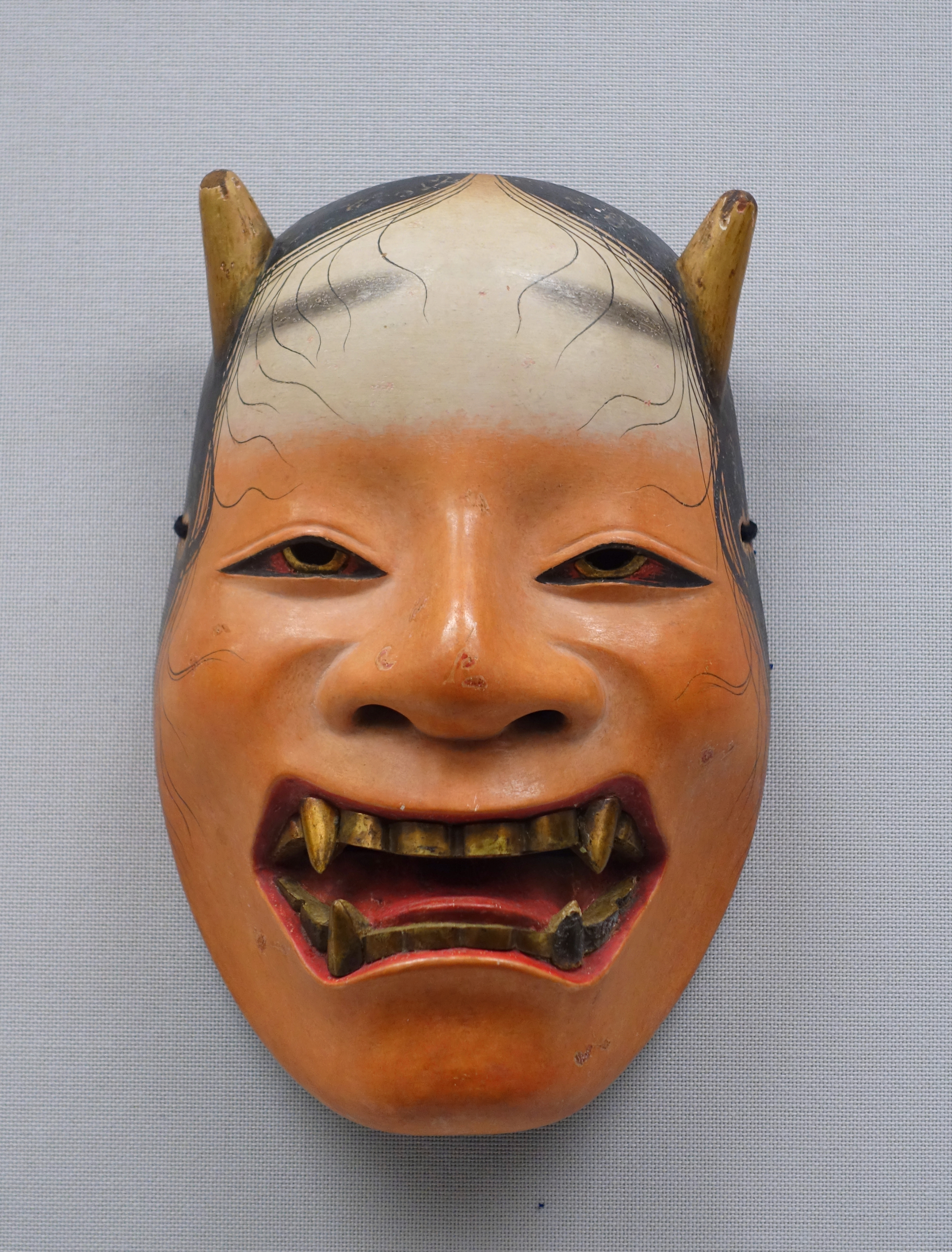
Namanari mask at the Tokyo National Museum. Edo period, 1700s or 1800s.

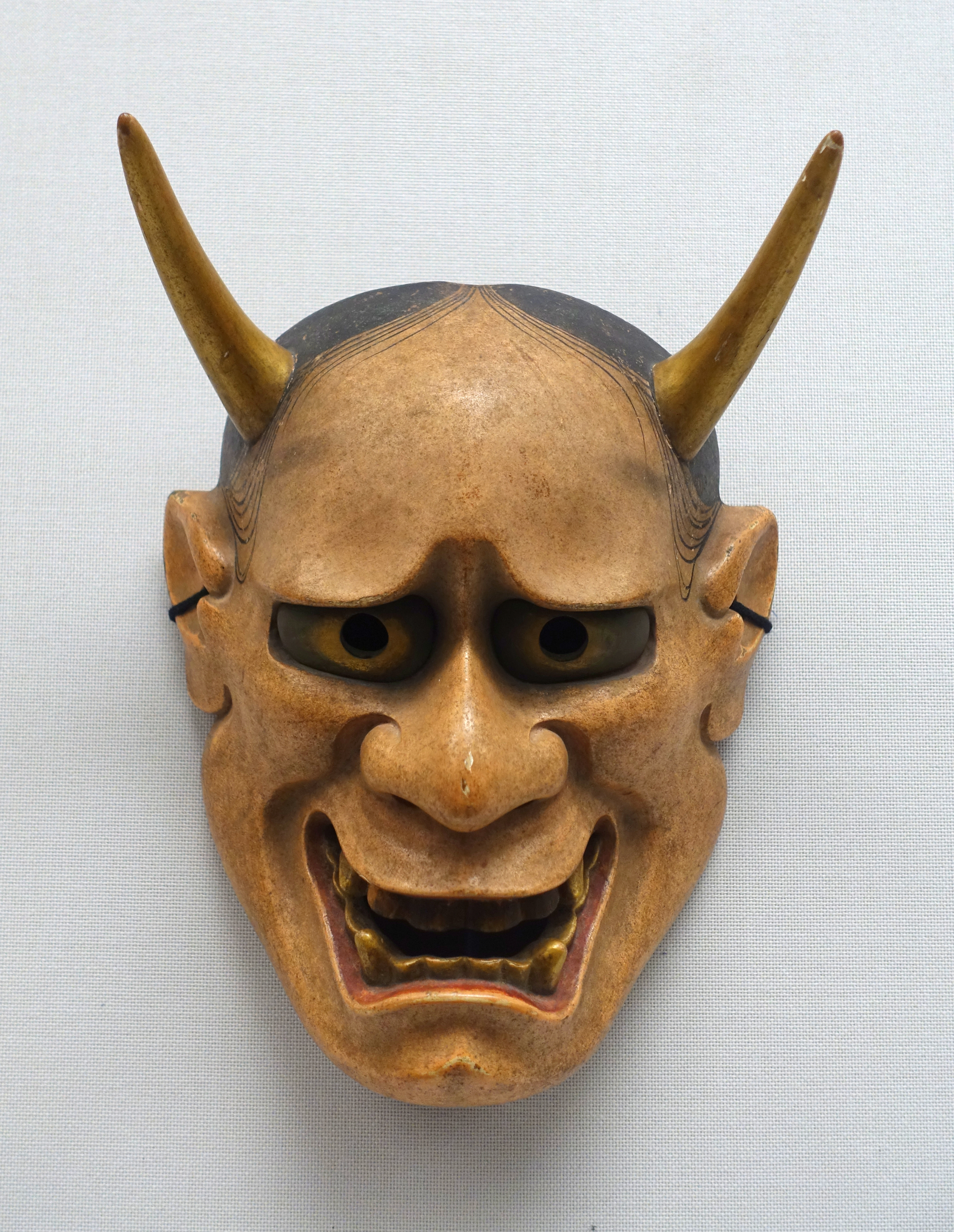
hannya (Chūnari) mask at the Tokyo National Museum. Edo period, 1600s or 1700s.

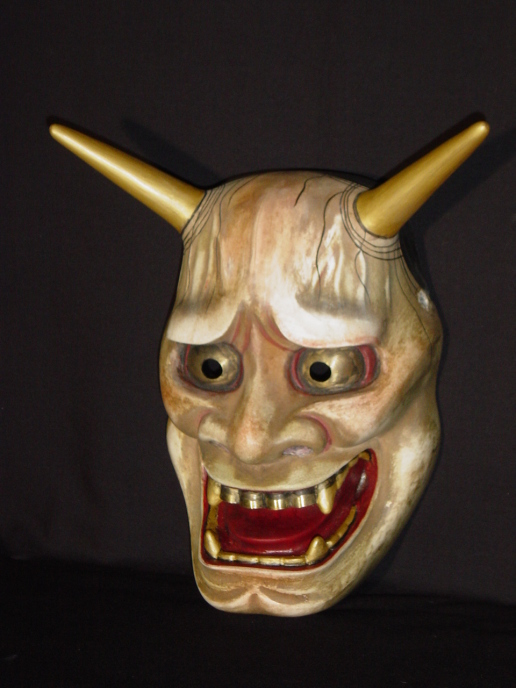
Shinjya mask. (Honnnari)

== Hannya in Bunraku ==
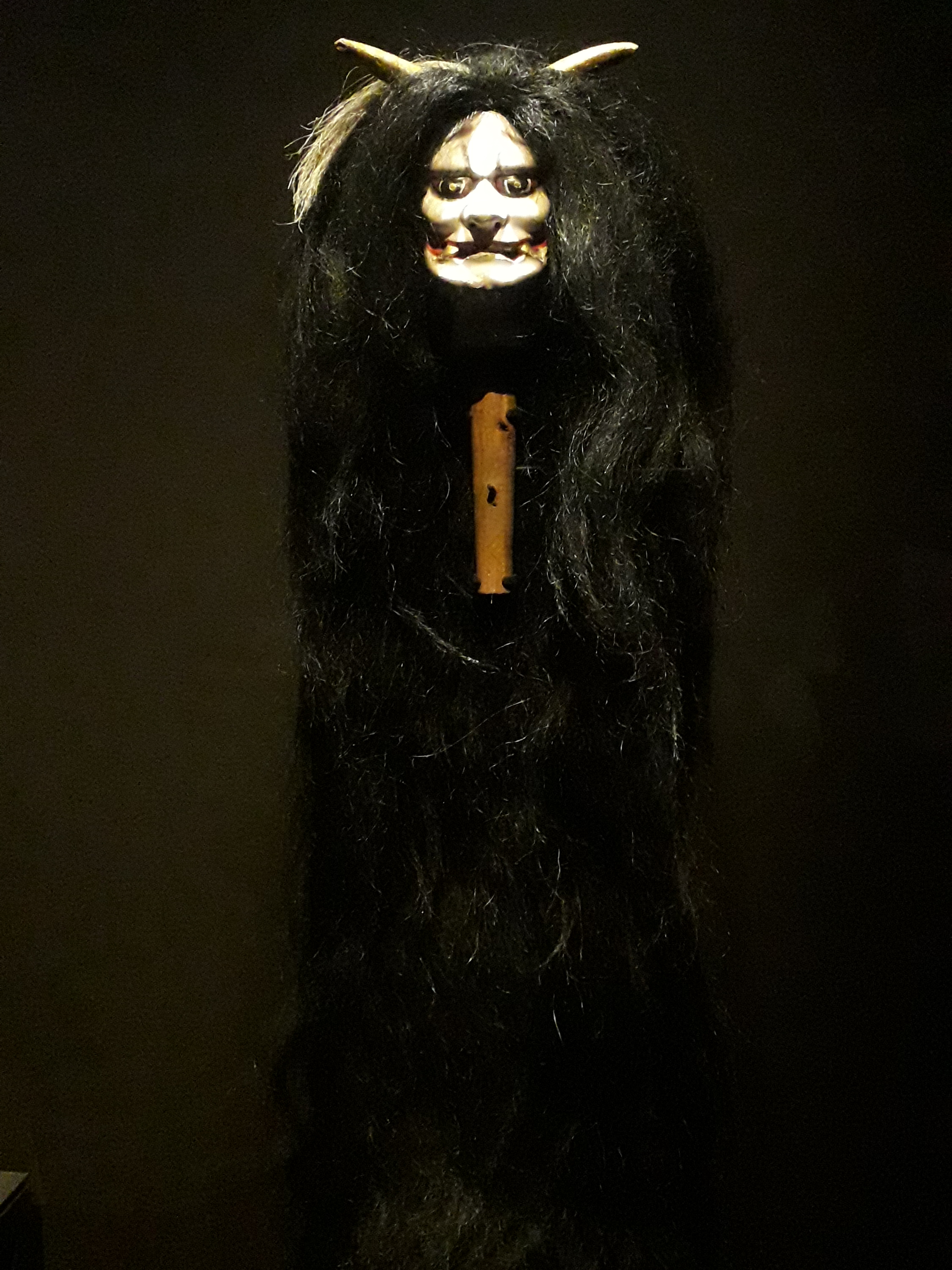
Hannya type head of a bunraku puppet

Hannya also appears in Bunraku, a puppet theater that began in the Edo period. The Japan Arts Council (ja) lists 129 types of puppet heads, and hannya is one of them. A puppet head of the gabu type can also represent hannya. The gabu is equipped with a device that allows the puppet to change its facial expression instantly by pulling a string. In this way, a single head can represent the transformation of a beautiful woman into hannya. When the puppeteer pulls the string attached to the gabu, the puppet with the face of a beautiful woman is transformed into a terrifying hannya with golden horns, large golden eyes, a mouth that reaches to the ears, and fangs.

== In popular culture ==
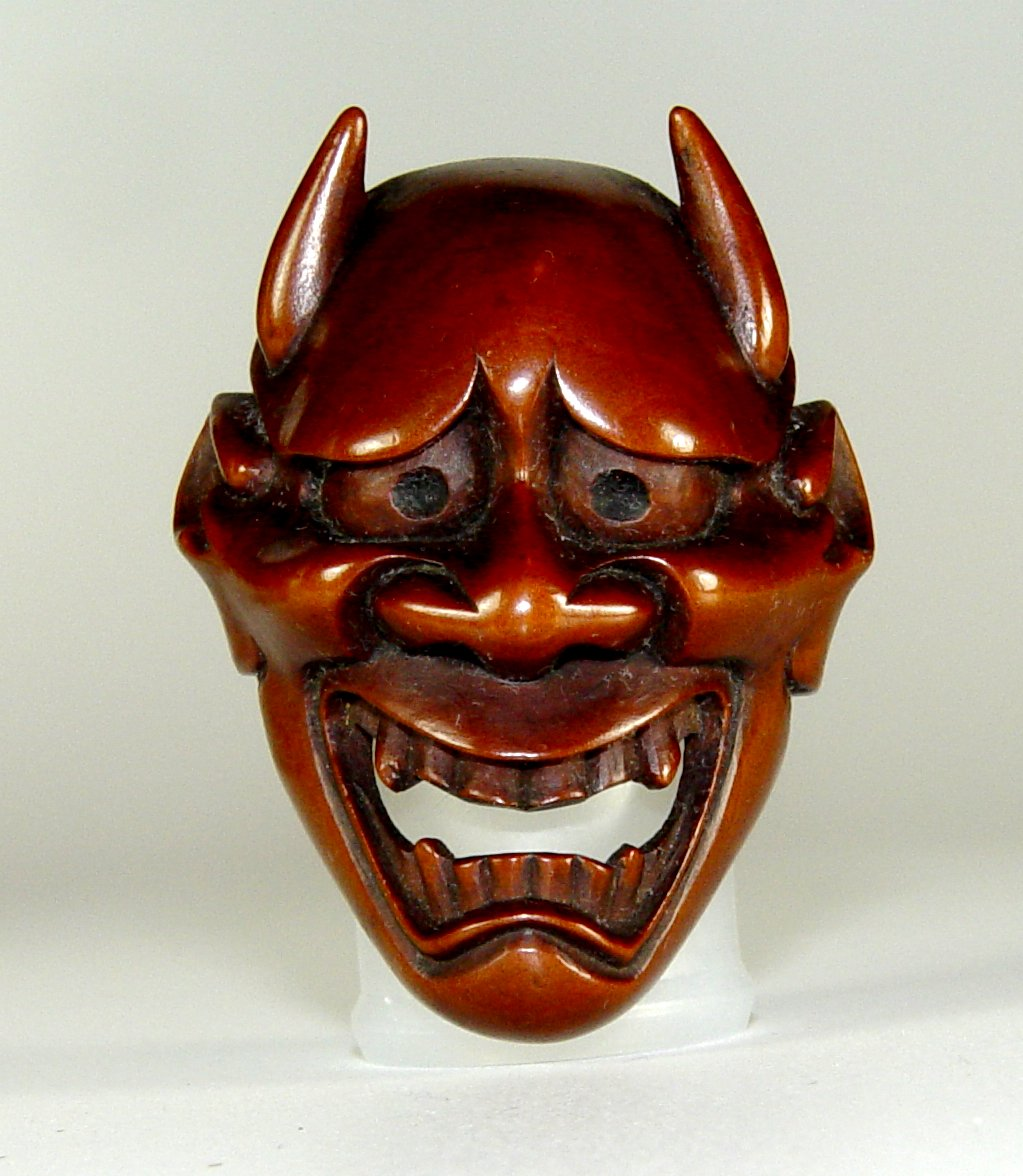
18th century netsuke shaped like a hannya mask

- In the mobile game Onmyoji, the character Hannya is a shikigami who has a hannya mask on his forehead and another on his back.
- In the manga and anime Rurouni Kenshin, a character named Hannya wears one of these masks and it is his namesake.
- In the Yakuza video game series, the character Goro Majima has a large tattoo of a hannya on his back. He also has an alter-ego, Hannya-Man, in Yakuza Kiwami, that wears a hannya mask.
- In a Detective Conan anime-only case, a woman who killed the people who drove her sister to suicide used the hannya as a murder motif. The hannya legend also influences a local tradition that follows the story of two envious girls who set up another named Ohana to be executed so they can steal her various kimono, but end up murdered by Ohana's vengeful soul, reborn as an immortal demon.
- In the 1998 survival horror video game Clock Tower II: The Struggle Within, a character named George Maxwell wears a hannya mask while wielding a large hatchet, implying when he was infected with a parasitic bacteria and became insane, he concealed his face with the mask.
- In the 2001 horror video game Fatal Frame, the Himuro family master wears a hannya mask. The game also features puzzles involving other Noh masks.
- In the 2014 video game The Battle Cats there is a boss that wears a Hannya mask, and is called "Hannya"
- In the 2019 action adventure video game Sekiro: Shadows Die Twice, one of the bosses named the Corrupted Monk wears a hannya mask to conceal her true face. She is based on the story of Yao Bikuni and the Ningyo and bears a likeness to her story, being an immortal monk who gained immortality due to eating a type of meat.
- In the 2022 action-adventure video game Ghostwire: Tokyo, the main antagonists conceals their identities with hannya masks.

== See also ==
- Hungry ghost
