= Uemura Shōen =

Japanese artist (1875–1949)

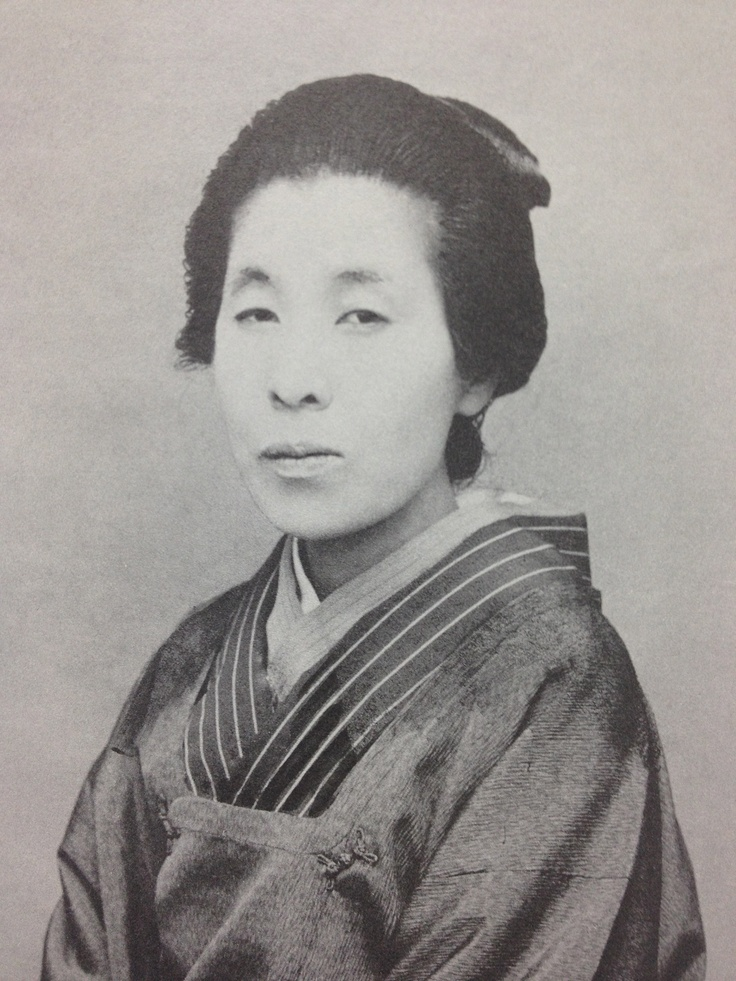
- Uemura Shōen
- Born: Uemura Tsune; April 23, 1875; Kyoto, Japan
- Died: August 27, 1949 (aged 74)
- Known for: Painter
- Movement: Nihonga
- Awards: Order of Culture

Uemura Shōen (上村 松園; April 23, 1875 – August 27, 1949) was the pseudonym of an artist in Meiji, Taishō and early Shōwa period Japanese painting. Her real name was Uemura Tsune. Shōen was known primarily for her bijin-ga, or paintings of beautiful women, in the nihonga style, although she produced numerous works on historical themes and traditional subjects. Shōen is considered a major innovator in the bijin-ga genre despite the fact she often still used it to depict the traditional beauty standards of women. Bijin-ga gained criticism during the Taisho era while Shōen worked due to its lack of evolution to reflect the more modern statuses of women in Japan. During bijin-ga's conception in the Tokugawa, or Edo, period, women were regarded as lower class citizens and the genre often reflected this implication onto its female subjects. Within the Taisho era, women had made several advancements into the Japanese workforce, and artistry specifically was becoming more popular outside of pass times for the elite, which opened way for Shōen's success. Shōen received many awards and forms of recognition during her lifetime within Japan, being the first female recipient of the Order of Culture award, as well as being hired as the Imperial Household's official artist, which had previously only employed one other official woman in the position. In 1949 she died of cancer just a year after receiving the Order of Culture Award.

== Biography ==
Shōen was born in Shimogyō-ku, Kyoto, as the second daughter of a tea merchant. She was born two months after the death of her father and, thus, grew up with her mother and aunts in an all-female household. Her mother's tea shop attracted a refined, cultured clientele for the art of Japanese tea ceremony. As a child at age 12 (1887), Shōen drew pictures and exhibited considerable skill at drawing human figures. By the age of 15 (1890) she was exhibiting her work and winning awards in official art contests as well as commissioning work for private patrons. She became obsessed with the ukiyo-e, Japanese woodblock print, works of Hokusai. Her mother supported her decision to pursue an artistic career. This was quite unusual for the time, and although Shōen did have successful contemporaries who were female, such as Ito Shoba (1877–1968) and Kajiwara Hisako (1896–1988), women were largely still not part of the Japanese public art scene outside of Tokyo. Among Japan's wedding traditions, specifically among upper-class unions, brides were gifted a konrei chōdo (bridal furnishing set), usually containing art supplies, such as brushes and paints. Provided with the necessary tools, many women pursued painting as an individual and private hobby, out of the public eye and in an amateur setting. Due to most women of the time's lack of formal education in the arts, few made a professional career of painting, regardless of how talented they may be. However, women living in the company of a professional artist, such as their fathers or husbands, had the resources and guidance to hone their skills in the craft, although few of these women became known for their work as an individual away from their educators.

Shōen was sent to the Kyoto Prefectural Painting School, where she studied under the Chinese style landscape painter Suzuki Shōnen (1849–1918). She also began studying the Kanō school and Sesshū schools styles of painting. Suzuki was so impressed that he gave her the first kanji of his own pseudonym of "Shōnen" in recognition of her talent. Shōen even allowed her to pursue her desire to paint figurally in his private studio despite the fact that the school's traditional teaching method did not allow students to begin figural practice until their later years. This was an exceptional breakthrough for the times; however, for a while her reputation was tainted as she was suspected of a liaison with her teacher, which may have been true. Soon afterwards she gave birth to an illegitimate son (the future painter Uemura Shōkō), whom she raised as a single mother. She later gave birth to a daughter and, likewise, never revealed the name of the father. This was in part due to the conservative and traditional nature of Kyoto which already placed pressure on unwed mothers. Shōnen himself however later revealed to Shōkō at the age of 14 that he was his father.

In 1894, Shōen became a disciple of Kōno Bairei and later of his successor Takeuchi Seihō. She won her first local award in 1898 with a work selected for the Exhibition of New and Old Art ("Shinko Bijutsu Tenrankai" or "Shinkoten") in Kyoto. She won her first national award in 1900 for a painting submitted to an exhibition sponsored by the Japan Fine Arts Academy (Nihon Bijutsuin) with the Japan Painting Association (Nihon Kaiga Kyokai). She later focused on producing work for display and sale at the government-sponsored Bunten exhibitions starting from 1907. The purchase of her painting, The Beauty of Four Seasons, by the Duke of Connaught on his visit to Japan, raised her to celebrity status at the mere age of fifteen. Shōen was chosen shortly after by the Japanese government to have her work shown in the Chicago World Exposition of 1893 along with many other prominent artists at the time, all older and mostly from Tokyo in comparison. Shōen painted another version of The Beauty of Four Seasons for the exposition and received an award for the painting.

Shōen drew from her artistic training and her personal interest in woodblock prints and older painting styles to develop new techniques and styles of composition with a broad range of subjects. Themes and elements from the traditional Noh drama frequently appeared in her works, but images of beautiful women (bijin-ga) came to dominate her work. Eventually, her work would combine the themes of both Noh and women in a single composition.

She painted Honō (焔, Flame) in 1918, a painting about female jealousy and eternal love that cemented her reputation. Shoen described the work as "the flame of a middle-aged woman's jealousy" which coincidentally debuted in the same year of Suzuki Shōnen's death. For a while after that, she did not exhibit her work.

In 1924, she returned to the art world by exhibiting a painting titled Yōkihi (楊貴妃, the consort Yang Guifei) at the Fourth Exhibition of the Imperial Academy of Fine Arts. The painting is now at the Shōhaku Art Museum in Nara.

During the 1930s, when Shōen was in her late 50s and early 60s, she began producing very large works. These include Spring and Autumn (1930), Jo-no-mai (1936), and Soshi-arai Komachi (1937). Many of these works, especially Jo-no-mai are now considered her greatest masterpieces. It is believed that the model for Jo-no-mai is Shoen's daughter-in-law portraying a confident and dignified woman in a brilliantly colored orange kimono fading into a cloud pattern at the hem.

Noh Dance Prelude (序の舞, Jo-no-mai)
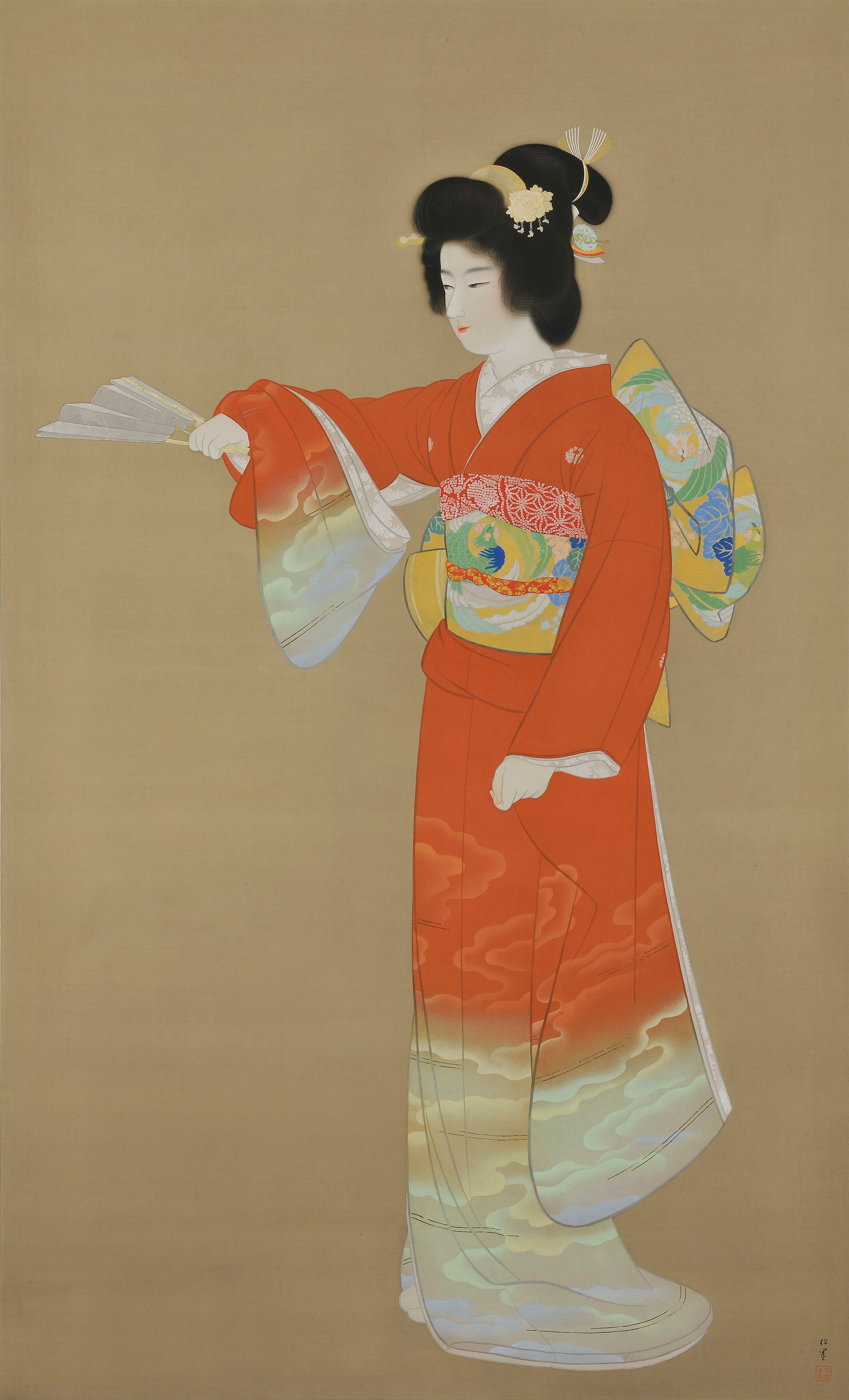
- Artist: Uemura Shōen
- Year: 1936
- Type: Nihonga watercolor on silk
- Dimensions: 223 cm × 141.3 cm (88 in × 55.6 in)
- Location: Tokyo National University of Fine Arts and Music, Tokyo

Jo-no-mai and Soshi-arai Komachi were inspired by the Noh theater. (Jo-no-mai is a dance performed in the introduction to a Noh play, and Soshi-arai Komachi is the title of a Noh play about the Heian period poet Ono no Komachi.) Shoen took great inspiration from the female character in noh theater. Men performed all the roles in noh theater, including the female roles. Despite this Shoen used women models to recreate the poses of her work suggesting something of her views of women. Both paintings are characterized by a strong feeling of majesty, with a large central figure against an empty background. The use of color is carefully planned so that the light surfaces of clothes and other items stand out prominently against the negative space.

In 1941, Shōen became the first woman painter in Japan to be invited to join the Imperial Art Academy. She was appointed a court painter to the Imperial Household Agency in 1944.

During World War II she supported nationalism in pieces like Late Autumn which depicts a beautiful woman doing her part to help the war. Despite her advanced age, she traveled to the war zone in China at the invitation of the Japanese government for propaganda purposes, to prove to people back home that all was going well. Many of her works from this period, including Twilight (1941), Clear Day (1941), and Late Autumn (1943), depict working women engaged in daily chores, who display a strong sense of vitality. As with her work from the 1930s, Shōen shows a skillful use of negative space, with realistic detail, neat lines, and a calm use of color. As the war situation deteriorated, in February 1945, Shōen was evacuated from Kyoto to the suburbs of Nara.

In 1948, she became the first woman to be awarded Japan's prestigious Order of Culture. Her painting Jo no mai was the first painting by a Japanese woman to be rated as an Important Cultural Property by the Agency of Cultural Affairs.

== Beautiful women ==
Honoo (焔, Flame), 1918. Tokyo National Museum.

Despite being known for works of beautiful women bijinga (Ukiyo-e beauty portraits) Shōen reportedly said "Never once did I paint a work with the expectation that it would be a fine work as long as the woman depicted was beautiful. My earnest hope is that all my works are like fragrant jewels, always with a sense of fresh purity, never with even an iota of the vulgar". She is respected for her fight for women's rights in Japan and her achievements as a great artist, not just a female artist.

During Shōen's time, Japanese art was experiencing a change in style and influence. Western production of oil paintings became popular. Shōen, however, stuck to her use of mineral pigments, or iwaenogu, and Japanese-style themes. Her paintings show ordinary women, female characters in noh theater, but the majority of her work shows women out in the elements in their finery. In Women Walking Against a Snowstorm (1911), a dramatic action scene is depicted of a beautiful woman not bending to the elements or the power of the storm. Shōen's work shows the quiet empowerment of women through her subtle portrayal of emotion. Uemura's 1918 work on the theme of jealousy, Honō (焔, Flame), which depicts an ikiryō (living ghost) incarnate in jealousy without compromising dignity, is considered to have raised the standard of nihonga. This work solidified her reputation by overturning the criticism some critics had made of her earlier work, calling her a "faceless doll". This work was directly inspired by Lady Rokujō, who appears in The Tale of Genji and the noh play Aoi no Ue, and was also inspired by Bijin zu (美人図, Beauty), an 18th century painting by Soga Shōhaku now in the collection of the Nara Prefectural Museum of Art. Shōen contributed to the change for how the public viewed women's art through her own works.

== Philately ==
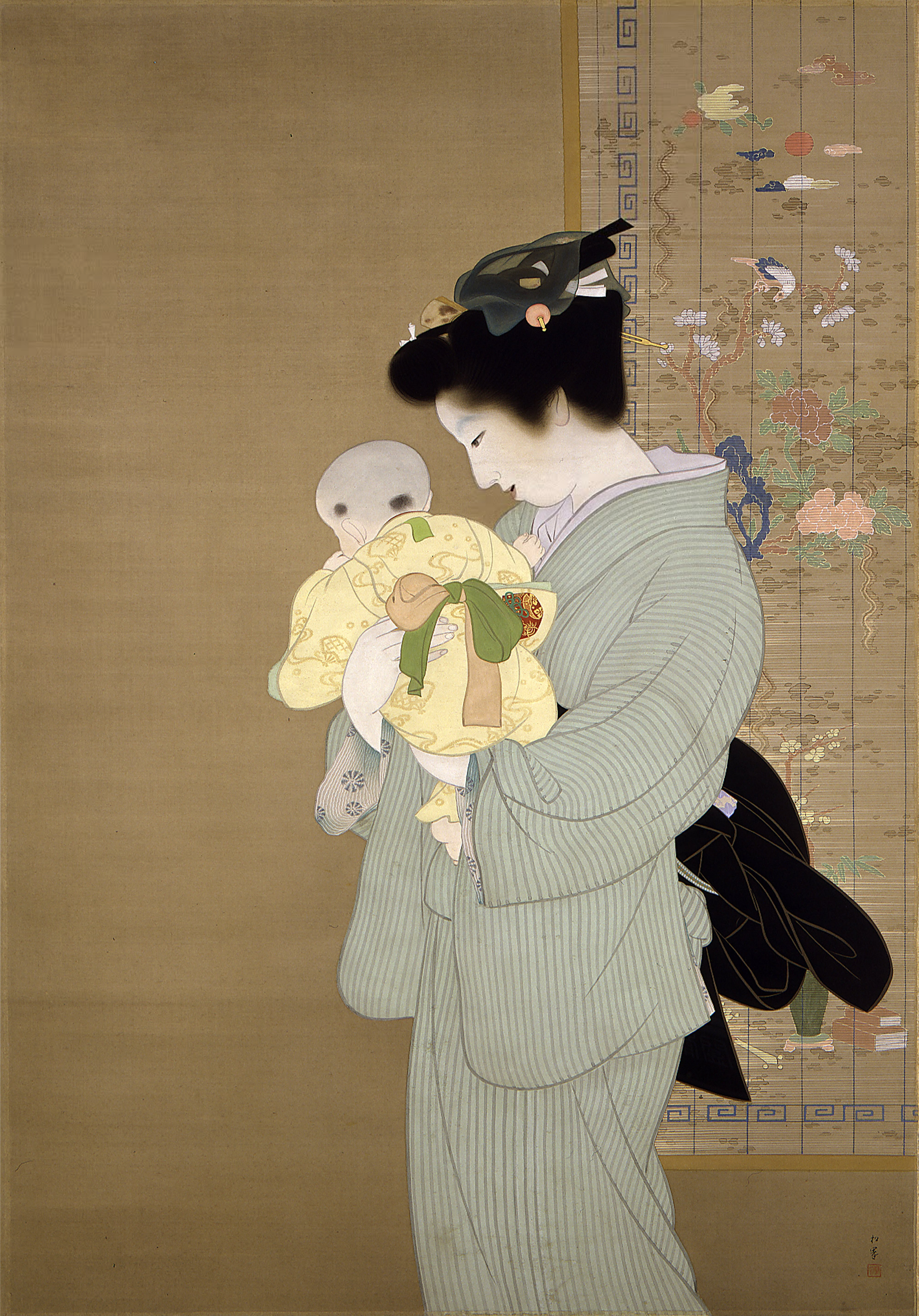
Mother and Child, 1934, Important Cultural Property, National Museum of Modern Art, Tokyo.

Uemura Shōen's works have appeared on Japanese commemorative postage stamps, including:

- 1965: Jo no mai, to commemorate the 1965 Philatelic Week
- 1980: Mother and Child, as part of the Modern Art Series

In 1999, Uemura Shōen herself was the subject of a commemorative postage stamp under the Cultural Leaders Series by Japan Post.

== Exhibitions ==
An exhibition of Uemura Shōen's work was held at the National Museum of Modern Art, Kyoto, Japan, from November 2 to December 12, 2010. It featured approximately 100 works.

In 2017, Shōen's work was featured in Uemura Shōen and Quintessential Bijinga, Paintings of Beautiful Women, an exhibition held from August 29 to October 22, 2017, organized by Yamatane Museum of Art and Nikkei Inc. The exhibition featured four sections: Uemura Shōen—Fragrant Beauty, Famous Women from Literature and History, Maiko and Geisha, Beauties Past and Present—Chic Japanese Garb Gorgeous Western Garb. Shōen dominated the selected works in the first section, with additional work being showcased in the second.

The Uemura Shōen retrospective was held at the Nakanoshima Museum of Art, Osaka, from March 29 to June 1, 2025. The exhibition marked the 150th anniversary of her birth and featured more than 100 works.
