= Mononoke (disambiguation) =

Mononoke are a type of spirit in Japanese folklore.

Mononoke may also refer to:

- Princess Mononoke, a 1997 Studio Ghibli film
- Mononoke (TV series), a Toei Animation television series
- Mononoke (software), a Mercurial server
