= Five Modern Noh Plays =

1956 play written by Yukio Mishima

- Written by: Yukio Mishima
- Original language: Japanese

Five Modern Noh Plays is a collection of plays written by Japanese writer Yukio Mishima. Mishima wrote these plays between 1950 and 1955 and presented them as modern plays in Tokyo. Of these five, only The Damask Drum was expressed in the traditional Noh fashion. The Lady Aoi was expressed as a Western-style opera. The plays take older Nō plots or traditional and foreign fairy tales and bring them to a modern setting.

Famed Japan scholar Donald Keene translated Five Modern Noh Plays.

== Plays ==
- Sotoba Komachi:

A poet meets Komachi, a repulsive-looking old woman, at a Tokyo park at night. She expresses the memory of when she had been lovely 80 years ago. She reminisces on a night in the 1880s, and together with the help of the poet (who acts the part of the military officer with whom she fell in love), they relive that night. The poet realizes that she is still beautiful, and sees past her ragged clothes and wretched body.

- The Damask Drum:

An old man becomes enamored with a neighbor. The neighbor and her associates play a trick on the man by challenging him to sound a drum. If he can make the drum sound, he will earn a kiss. However, this drum is made of damask, and is only a prop, incapable of making any sound.

- Kantan:

A youth who sees no meaning in anything, wonders what will happen if he sleeps on a magical pillow which makes the dreamer realize what he already understands, the futility of existence.

- Hanjo
- The Lady Aoi

== Reception ==
Mishima received the illustrious Kishida Prize for Drama from Shinchosha Publishing in 1955.

== See also ==
- Aoi no Ue
- My Friend Hitler
- Theatre of Japan
