= Ikiryō =

Spirit in Japanese folklore

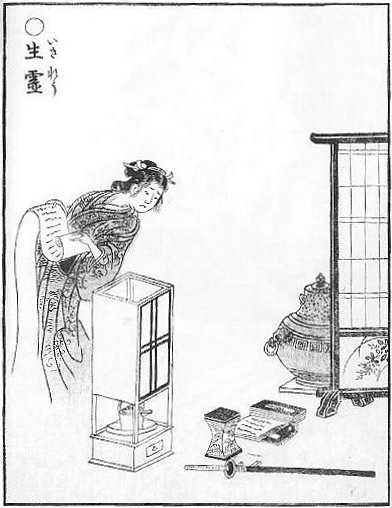
Ikiryō (生霊) from the 1776 book Gazu Hyakki Yagyō by Sekien Toriyama

Ikiryō (生霊; lit. 'living ghost'), also known as shōryō (しょうりょう), seirei (せいれい), or ikisudama (いきすだま), is a disembodied spirit or ghost in Japanese popular belief and fiction that leaves the body of a living person and subsequently haunts other people or places, sometimes across great distances. The term(s) are used in contrast to shiryō, which refers to the spirit of those who are already deceased.

== Summary ==
The popular belief that the human spirit (or soul) can escape from the body has been around since early times, with eyewitness accounts and experiences (hauntings, possessions, out-of-body experience) reported in anecdotal and fictional writings. Vengeful spirits (怨霊, onryō) of the living are said to inflict curses (祟り, tatari) upon the subject or subjects of their vengeance by means of transforming into their ikiryō form. It is believed that if a sufficient grudge is held, all or part of the perpetrator's soul leaves the body, appearing in front of the victim to harm or curse them, a concept not so dissimilar from the evil eye. The ikiryō has even made its way into Buddhist scriptures, where they are described as "living spirits" who, if angered, might bring about curses, even just before their death. Possession is another means by which the Ikiryō are commonly believed to be capable of inflicting harm, the possessed person thought to be unaware of this process. (Note: Kojien dictionary (in Japanese)) However, according to mythology, the ikiryō does not necessarily act out of spite or vengefulness, and stories are told of the ikiryō who bears no grudge, or poses no real threat. In recorded examples, the spirit sometimes takes possession of another person's body for motives other than vengeance, such as love and infatuation (for example the Matsutōya ghost below). A person's ikiryō may also leave the body (often very shortly before death) to manifest its presence around loved ones, friends and/or acquaintances.

== Classical literature ==
Nihonga Honō (焔, Flame) by Uemura Shōen, 1918. Tokyo National Museum. This work was inspired by Lady Rokujō, the ikiryō from The Tale of Genji and the Noh play Aoi no Ue.

In classical literature, The Tale of Genji (ca. 1000) describes the "well known" episode of the ikisudama (the more archaic term for ikiryō) that emerged from Genji's lover Lady Rokujo, and tormented Genji's pregnant wife Aoi no Ue, resulting in her death after childbirth. This spirit is also portrayed in Aoi no Ue, the Noh play adaptation of the same story. After her death, Lady Rokujo became an onryō and went on to torment those who would later become Genji's consorts, Murasaki no Ue and Onna-sannomiya.

In the Heian period, a human soul leaving a body and drifting away is described by the old verb akugaru meaning "departure". In The Tale of Genji, the mentally troubled Kashiwagi fears that his soul may be found wandering (akugaru), and requests that last rites are performed on his body to stop his soul from escaping if this should happen. (Note: Kojien dictionary, akugaru, sense 2.) (Note: Another example of this term occurs in the verse by the poet Izumi Shikibu which depicts the author's soul as a wandering firefly: "While I am rapt in thought, / The fireflies of the marsh would seem to be / My soul, caught up and wandering / Forth out of me." (Goshūi Wakashū, Tale 20).)

Konjaku Monogatarishū contains the tale "How the Ikiryo Spirit of Omi Province Came and Killed a Man of the Capital". In the tale, a commoner encounters a noblewoman and guides her to the house of a certain Senior Assistant Minister of Popular Affairs (民部大夫, Minbu-no-tayū) in the capital. Little did the guide know that he was guiding the ikiryō of a woman to her neglecting husband. Upon reaching the house the lady vanishes, though the gates remain shut. Wailing noises are heard inside the house. The following morning, the guide learns that the master of the house had complained the ikiryō of his former wife was present and causing him illness, shortly after which he died. The guide later seeks out the lady's house in Ōmi Province. There a woman speaks to him through blinds, acknowledging the man's services that day, and showers him with gifts of silk cloth.

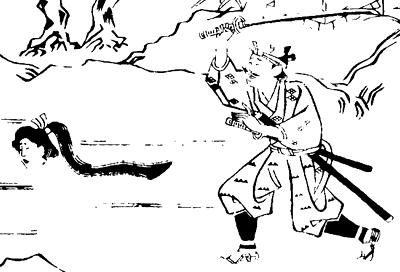
"Onna no Mōnen Mayoiaruku Koto" (女の妄念迷ひ歩く事) from the 1573 work Sorori Monogatari (曾呂利物語)

The ikiryō can also possess the object of its infatuation, who is neither rival nor enemy. The Matsutōya Yūrei, (Note: The tale is recorded in the essay collection, Okinagusa (翁草).) a tale allegedly based on events that occurred during Kyōhō 14 or 15 (1729–1730), a Kyoto merchant named Matsutōya Tokubei (松任屋徳兵衛) had a teenaged son named Matsunosuke possessed by the spirit of two women who loved him, and who tormented the boy's conscience. On occasion, he would be suspended in mid-air, engaging in conversation as if the girls were present before his eyes, the ikiryō's words being spoken through the boy's lips. Finally the family sought help from a renowned priest named Zōkai. (Note: Zōkai Etan (象海慧湛), 1682–1733) The priest successfully exorcised the boy and cured his condition, but rumors had already spread regarding the incident.

The horror story (kaidan) collection Sorori Monogatari (曾呂利物語), published Kanbun 3, or 1663, includes a tale of a woman whose ikiryō assumed the shape of her severed head. (Note: cf. the yōkai monster known as nukekubi.) One night, a man traveling towards Kyoto arrives at place called Sawaya in Kita-no-shō, Echizen Province (now Fukui City), where he mistakedly thinks he saw a chicken fly from the base of a nearby stone tower on to the road. The imagined chicken turns out to be (or has transformed into) a lively severed head of a woman. When the face grins at him, he attacks with a sword, and chases it to a home in the capital of the province. Inside the house, the housewife awakes from a nightmare being chased by a man brandishing a blade. The wandering head was, according to the title, the woman's mōnen (妄念), or her wayward thoughts and obsessions. The woman later turns Buddhist nun to repent for her sins. (Note: Original source story title is Onna no maunen mayohi ariku koto (女のまうねんまよひありく事))

== Folk legends ==
=== Regional near-death spirits ===
Sightings of ikiryō belonging to those whose deaths are imminent have been recorded from all over Japan. Stories abound of spirits that materialize (or otherwise manifest their presence) to someone dear to them, such as immediate family. The recipient of the visit experiencing a metaphysical foreshadowing of this person's death, before any tangible news of bereavement arrives.

Many of the local terms for the ikiryō were collected by Kunio Yanagita and his school of folklorists. (Note: While terms such as tobi-damashi, omokage, akita, or shininbō are used in the Ishikawa Prefecture in isolated cases, these terms are not frequently used elsewhere.)

In the tradition of the Nishitsugaru District, Aomori Prefecture, the souls of the person/s on the brink of death are called amabito, and believed to depart from the body and walk around, sometimes making noises like that of the door sliding open.

According to Yanagita, tobi-damashi (飛びだまし) is the equivalent term to the Senboku District, Akita region. Yanagita defines this as the ability of certain persons to traverse the world in their ikirȳo form. Such individuals are purported to have voluntary control of this ability, in contrast to those who are only temporarily capable of tapping into such a state as a precursor to their death.

In the Kazuno District in Akita Prefecture, a soul that pays visit to acquaintances is called an omokage (面影〔オモカゲ〕; "reminiscence, lingering shadow"), and assumes the form of a living human, that is to say, it has feet and make pitter-patter noises, unlike the stereotypical Japanese ghost that have no legs or feet.

Yanagita in Tōno Monogatari Shūi reported that in the Tōno Region, Iwate Prefecture, "the thoughts of the dead or the living coalesce into a walking shape, and appear to the human eye as an illusion is termed an omaku in this region." An example being a beautiful girl aged 16 or 17, critically ill with a case of "cold damage" (傷寒, shōkan), i.e., typhoid fever or a similar disease. She was seen wandering around the construction site of the Kōganji temple rebuild project in Tsujibuchi, Iwate, the days before her death. (Note: "lower-alpha")

In Kashima District, Ishikawa on the Noto Peninsula, a folklorist recorded belief in the shininbō (死人坊), said to appear two or three days before someone's death, which was seen passing through on its visits to danna-dera (the family temple, also called bodaiji). The temple was believed to be the soul's final resting grounds, where one finds a place amongst their ancestors.

==== Soul flames ====
There are cases where the wandering ikiryō appear as a floating "soul flame", known in Japan as the hitodama or hidama. (Note: A [[onibi#types of onibi|hidama]], the Japanese equivalent to the will-o'-the-wisp (or generically "atmospheric ghost lights")) However, a "soul flame" from a person who is near death is not considered unusual, with the traditional conception among Japanese being that the soul escapes the body within a short phase (several days) either before or after death. Therefore, pre-death soul flames may not be treated as cases of ikiryō in works on the subject of ghosts, but filed under chapters on the hitodama phenomenon. (Note: Konno 1969, pp. 44–46 describes cases of floating balloon-like objects of yellow color (iridescent colored, according to Konno) an omen of death. The locals in the Shimokita District, Aomori refer to the object as tamashi (タマシ; "souls"), the same term in common usage by locals in Komena hamlet, in the town of Ōhata. On the day after a sighting of one heading towards the mountains (Mount Osore) on April 2, 1963, a boy died in the hospital from injuries he sustained falling off a bridge while double-riding a bicycle.)

One case of a near-death hitodama deemed "suitable for discussion" under the topic of ikiryō by a folklorist closely resembled the aforementioned tale of the woman's head in the Sorori Monogatari, namely, that the subject who witnessed the soul's apparition pursued it ruthlessly, until he discovered the owner of the soul, who claimed to have seen the entire experience of being chased during a dream. The subject worked at the town office of Tōno, Iwate, and one night, he reported seeing an hidama emerge from a stable and into the house's entrance where it was "flying around". He claimed to have chased it with a broom, and trapped it beneath a washbasin. A while after, he was rushed out to see his sick uncle on the brink of death, but he made sure to release the fireball from its trapping. He soon learned that his uncle had only just died, but his uncle came back to life again, enough so to accuse the nephew of chasing him with a broom and capturing him. Similarly, the folklore archives of Umedoi, Mie Prefecture (now part of Inabe) tells a tale about a band of men who, late in the night, spotted and chased a fireball into a sake warehouse, waking a maid who was asleep inside. The maid later professed to being "pursued by many men and fleeing" to take refuge in the warehouse.

=== Ikiryō as an illness ===
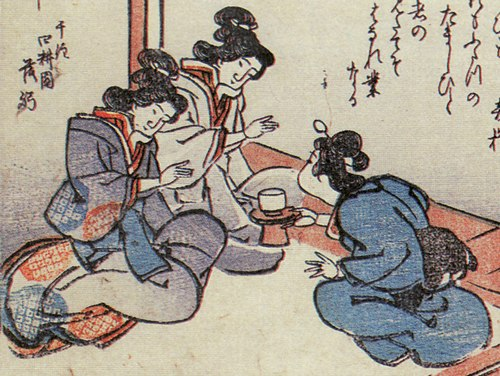
Rikonbyō (離魂病) from the Kyōka Hyaku Monogatari, illustrated by Masasumi Ryūkansaijin in 1853. The woman on the left is afflicted by the "soul separation illness", and her ikiryō appears next to her.

During the Edo period, there was a belief that there was a condition called rikonbyō (離魂病; "soul separation illness"), whereby the soul would not just separate from the body, but assume the shape and appearance of the sufferer. The condition was also known interchangeably as kage no yamai (影の病; "shadow sickness"), alternately written as kage-no-wazurai (カゲノワズライ).

This affliction is treated as an instance of ikiryō by folklorist Ensuke Konno in his chapter on the topic. The case study example is that of Yūji Kita, doomed by the kage no yamai for three generations in succession, recorded in the Ōshu Banashi (奥州波奈志; "Far North Tales") by Tadano Makuzu.

The identical double might be seen by the sufferer or be witnessed by others, and can be classed as a doppelgänger phenomenon. Others have reported a sort of out-of-body experience, whereby their consciousness inhabits the ikiryō to see their own lifeless body.

== Similar activity or phenomena ==
The ushi no koku mairi (丑の刻参り) is, when one, in the hour of the ox (1 am to 3 am), strikes a nail in a sacred tree, and thus becomes an oni while alive, and using these oni powers, would inflict curses and calamity upon a rival. Although many ikiryō generally are spirits of humans that leave the body unconsciously and move about, deeds akin to performing magic rituals and intentionally tormenting a target can also be interpreted as ikiryō. In the same way, in the Okinawa Prefecture, performing of a magic ritual with the intention of becoming an ikiryō is termed ichijama.

== See also ==
- Astral projection
- Doppelgänger
- Eidolon
- Fetch (folklore)
- Goryō
- Out of body experience
- Onryō
- Soul
