= Shōhaku Art Museum =

- 松伯美術館
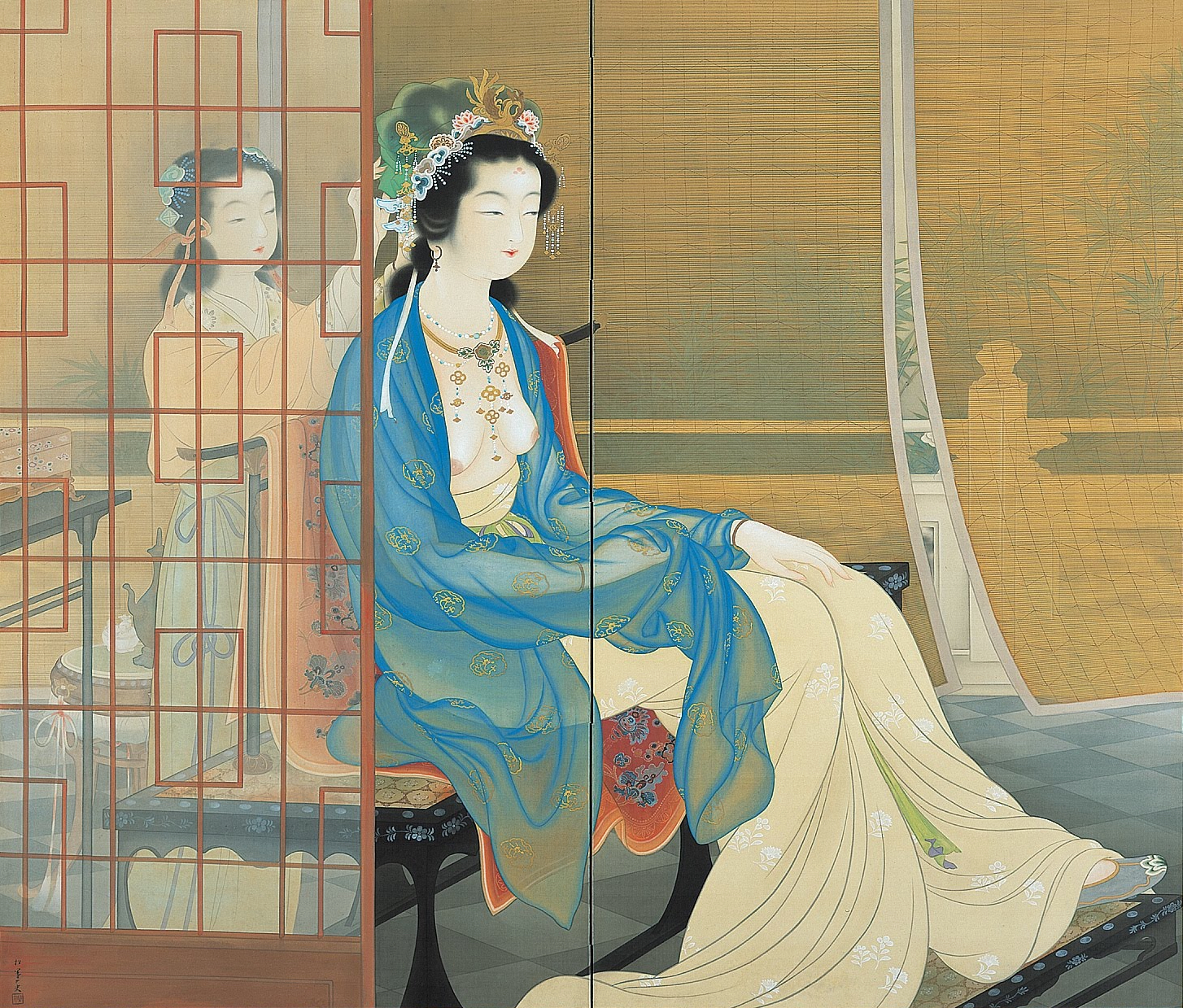
- Yang Guifei by Uemura Shōen (1922)
- Interactive map of the Shōhaku Art Museum area

General information
- Location: 2-1-4 Tomigaoka, Nara, Nara Prefecture, Japan
- Coordinates: 34°42′36″N 135°44′50″E
- Opened: March 1994

Website
- Official website

Shōhaku Art Museum (松伯美術館, Shōhaku Bijutsukan) opened in Nara, Japan, in 1994. It was established thanks to donations of artworks and the support of Kintetsu. The collection comprises paintings and sketches by Uemura Shōen, Uemura Shōkō (上村松篁), and Uemura Atsushi (上村淳之), and special exhibitions are staged to help promote the appreciation of Nihonga. The shō (松) element of the museum's name is derived from the first character of the first two of these artists' given names, as well as from the pines in the garden of the former honorary chairman of Kintetsu, where the museum now stands, while the haku (伯) element comes from its tea house, known as Hakusentei (伯泉亭).

== See also ==
- Nara National Museum
- Yamato Bunkakan
- Nakano Museum of Art
- Nihonga
