= Lady Rokujō =

- The Tale of Genji character
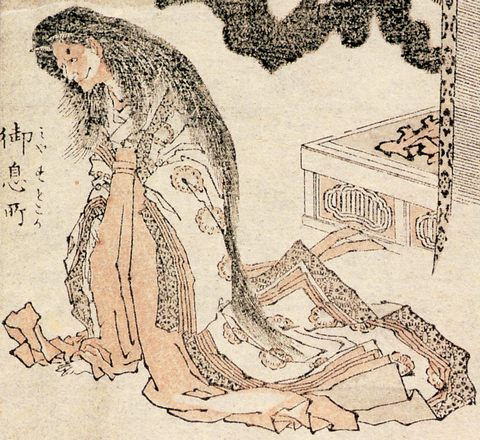
- Lady Rokujo depicted as an ikiryō the Hokusai Manga Aoi no Ue by Katsushika Hokusai.

In-universe information
- Occupation: Imperial Consort
- Significant others: Emperor Reizei, Hikaru Genji
- Children: Empress Akikonomu

Lady Rokujō (六条御息所, Rokujō no Miyasundokoro) is a fictional character in The Tale of Genji (Genji Monogatari). She is a mistress of the novel's protagonist, Hikaru Genji, with whom she becomes infatuated and jealous of his other lovers. Her jealousy subconsciously causes her ikiryō (wandering spirit) to become a Shiryo (also known as a Yūrei) that attacks and murders multiple other mistresses and wives of Genji.

Lady Rokujō is a relatively minor character in the novel. She appears in chapters Yūgao, Hana no En, Sakaki, Miotsukushi and Wakana. Outside of these chapters, Lady Rokujō has little mention or influence on the novel.

Lady Rokujō is also the protagonist of two Nōh dramas. In Nonomiya ("The Shrine in the Fields"), Lady Rokujō pretends to be a village woman who tells a traveling monk of Lady Rokujō's story. In Aoi no Ue ("Lady Aoi"), Lady Rokujō possesses Genji's wife, Lady Aoi, out of jealousy, causing Lady Aoi to fall ill. Aoi no Ue was later adapted into a modern stage play by Yukio Mishima in The Lady Aoi.

== Origins ==
Lady Rokujō is based on the role of Japanese noblewomen consorts in the 12th century.

Her character is named after her residence on Sixth Street (Rokujō) of the capital city Heian-kyō, Kyogoku. She is also referred to as Rokujō no Miyasundokoro depending on translations. Her name is an alias as the novel was written during the Heian era during which it was considered socially unacceptable to mention individuals by given name.

== Background ==
Lady Rokujō is the daughter of a high ranking Minister of the Left. Before the events of The Tale of Genji, Lady Rokujō was the consort to the crown prince. Lady Rokujō had a daughter with the crown prince at 16, whom they named Akikonomu. At 20 years old, the crown prince died. Akikonomu became a consort of Emperor Reizei.

== Role in The Tale of Genji ==
Lady Rokujō is abruptly first mentioned in the novel in the chapter Yūgao, by which time she and Genji have been having an affair for some time. (Some scholars speculate the existence of a lost or deleted chapter, Kagayaku Hinomiya, between Kiritsubo and Hahakigi, in which she was properly introduced.) During Yūgao, Genji visits but loses interest in Lady Rokujō as he is intrigued by Yūgao. Yūgao is killed by a possessing spirit, presumed to be that of Lady Rokujō.

Lady Rokujō next appears in the chapter Hana no En. Lady Rokujō visits the Kamo Matsuri Festival. Lady Rokujō is humiliated when her Gissha is rudely pushed aside by Lady Aoi’s manservants and Genji ignores her. Lady Rokujō notices Lady Aoi is pregnant with Genji's child and becomes jealous. Her spirit rushes out of her body as a wrathful Shiryo and possesses Lady Aoi. Lady Aoi becomes extremely ill, and rumors spread that a jealous lover of Genji must be possessing Lady Aoi. Lady Rokujō denies rumors that it is her spirit torturing Genji’s mistress. Lady Rokujō has a dream about an aggressive encounter with a rival woman, and wakes to find she smells of poppy seeds. Lady Rokujō realizes she is the Shiryo possessing Lady Aoi. Lady Rokujō is distraught at the revelation. Her negative feelings strengthen the Shiryo, and Lady Aoi dies as a result.

In the following chapter Sakaki, Lady Rokujō is frightened by her jealous Shiryo. She leaves to the Ise Province with her daughter Akikonomu to purify and contain her spirit. Genji visits her briefly.

Lady Rokujō next appears at the end of the chapter Miotsukushi. Lady Rokujō and Akikonomu return to the capital. Lady Rokujō dies soon after from illness, and entrusts Akikonomu and her estate to Genji. In her will, Lady Rokujō asks Genji not to begin a sexual relationship with Akikonomu, so he appoints her as a court lady of the new Emperor.

In chapter Wakana, Genji describes his affair with Lady Rokujō to Lady Murasaki. Genji states how he found Lady Rokujō difficult to be with. Unknown to Genji, Lady Rokujō's spirit is bound to him through her jealousy and overhears the conversation. Lady Rokujō's spirit is so humiliated she possesses Lady Murasaki. Lady Murasaki falls ill. Genji asks a buddhist clergy, Shintō deities (also known as Kami) of the native lands, and foreign Buddhas for help to perform an exorcism, but they are unsuccessful. After several weeks, Lady Rokujō's possession causes Lady Murasaki to stop breathing. Genji and others pray, causing Lady Rokujō's spirit to jump out of Lady Murasaki's body into the medium body of a little girl.

Lady Rokujō speaks to Genji through the medium. She admits she wants Genji to suffer because of her unrequited feelings and jealousy. Lady Rokujō states now that she has died she wishes Genji would forgive her wrongdoings and defend her name. Genji apologizes, and Lady Murasaki begins breathing again. Lady Rokujō's spirit disappears.

Lady Rokujō's is only referenced directly once following these chapters. In chapter Suzumushi, Empress Akikonomu expresses her wish to become a priestess to console Lady Rokujō's spirit. Empress Akikonomu states she can feel Lady Rokujō's spirit is still in agony. Genji persuades her not to.

== Role in Aoi no Ue ==
Aoi no Ue is set during Lady Rokujō's possession of Lady Aoi after the Kamo Matsuri Festival. Lady Aoi’s family invite Priestess Teruhi to summon the spirit possessing Lady Aoi and find out its name through Azusa yumi. Priestess Teruhi's prayers trap the spirit and it appears as Lady Rokujō.

Lady Rokujō states her distress at being mistreated by Lady Aoi's manservants at the Kamo Matsuri Festival and being ignored by Genji. Lady Rokujō's Shiryo looks at Lady Aoi and is enraged by jealousy. Lady Rokujō's spirit attacks Lady Aoi to beat her soul out of her body.

Lady Aoi’s family invite Priest Yokawa-no-hijiri to help, who uses a sacred invocation that turns Lady Rokujō's jealousy into a female ogre. The ogre beats Lady Aoi and the Priest Yokawa-no-hijiri.

The priest, Lady Aoi and her family overwhelm and pacify Lady Rokujō's spirit. Lady Rokujō's spirit becomes peaceful. It is insinuated her spirit may now transform into a Buddha.

== Role in Nonomiya ==
Lady Rokujō, disguised as an elegant village woman, finds a monk praying at a Shintō shrine in Nonomiya Sagano, Kyoto, and asks him to leave. She tells him she visits the shrine every year on this day to remember the past and offer a ritual. Lady Rokujō tells the monk her life story as portrayed in The Tale of Genji.

Lady Rokujō says Genji once visited her at this shrine on this day several years ago. Lady Rokujō states she has since dedicated herself to purifying the shrine with her daughter, Akikonomo. Lady Rokujō then reveals she is Lady Rokujō and disappears.

The monk hears more about Lady Rokujō's story from another villager and prays to her spirit at the shrine. Lady Rokujō's spirit appears in a Gissha. Lady Rokujō tells the monk how Lady Aoi’s manservants humiliated her at the Kamo Matsuki Festival. She asks the monk to pray to save her spirit as she is trapped by her jealousy over Genji.

Lady Rokujō recalls her memory of parting from Genji at the Nonomiya Shrine after he had briefly visited her. Lady Rokujō is overcome with emotions and dances around the shrine before climbing into the Gissha and disappearing.

== Performance history in Nōh dramas ==
Lady Rokujō's character is described in The Tale of Genji as an older woman of high-standing nobility. She is the daughter of a high ranking Minister of the Left, and was the consort to the crown prince and the Emperor. Due to her status, actors playing Lady Rokujō's character have historically expressed dignity and grace through their movements. Lady Rokujō's character is also historically meant to be dressed in luxurious fabrics and gowns to depict her wealth and status. These wardrobe choices are meant to juxtapose the humiliating actions of Lady Aoi's manservants and Genji in Aoi no Ue, as Lady Rokujō enters the stage in the first half of the drama in on her broken Gissha.

Lady Rokujō is also an extremely emotional and jealous character throughout The Tale of Genji and both of the Nōh dramas. Due to this, Lady Rokujō actors have historically been instructed to depict her as constantly wistful and painfully sad over what will never be. In Nonomiya, Lady Rokujō actors are directed to dance sadly to the point of tears to express Lady Rokujō's extreme feelings for Genji.

== Translation disagreements ==
Due to different historical and modern translation techniques, some translations of The Tale of Genji suggest Lady Rokujō was so jealous of Genji's sexual relationship with Yugao in chapter Yugao that she possessed and killed Yugao in her sleep. However, other translations suggest Yugao died due to another spirit that was not Lady Rokujō. Due to the original manuscript no longer existing, these translation issues remain unresolved.
