= Aoi no Ue =

- The Tale of Genji character

In-universe information
- Spouse: Hikaru Genji
- Children: Yūgiri

Aoi no Ue (葵の上) is a fictional character in The Tale of Genji (Genji Monogatari). Daughter of the Minister of the Left (Tō no Chūjō's sister) and Genji's first principal wife, she marries Genji when she is sixteen and he is only twelve. Proud and distant from her husband, Aoi is constantly aware of the age difference between them and very much hurt by Genji's philandering. Aoi temporarily gains Genji's favour after giving birth to his son Yūgiri and experiencing spells of spirit possession. The episode of spirit possession itself (mono no ke) is extremely controversial and brings forward two female characters of the tale: Aoi (Genji's wife) and Lady Rokujō (Genji's mistress). The relationship between the two women may be that between victim and aggressor, if one follows the traditional interpretation of spirit possession, (Note: Royall Tyler tends to interpret spirit possession at face value, at least in the case of another female character, Ukifune.) Aoi dies at the end of the "Aoi" chapter and her exit from the tale is thus definitive.

Aoi no Ue is also the title of a Noh play about her, translated as Lady of the Court, or in the modern version by Yukio Mishima, The Lady Aoi.

Aoi no Ue is the Senior Minister of State family's daughter and Hikaru Genji's formal wife. She was seriously ill and possessed by a phantom which was caused by Hikaru Genji's first lover Rokujō. While her family struggled to recover her and attempted various cures, nothing was able to bring her back to normal. Her family then decided to invite the master of the art of Azusa, Priestess Teruhi, in order to identify the causation of the phantom. Priestess Teruhi used a bow made of Japanese cherry birch and called forth phantoms with the sound. The Priestess Teruhi trapped the phantom, and found the spirit was Genji's first lover and the deceased crown prince's wife Lady Rokujō (Rokujō no Miyasundokoro) who was a very sophisticated noble lady. Although after losing Genji's attention she decided to secretly visit the festival parade which Genji attended. Then she found Lady Aoi and felt jealous, and beats and hates Genji's younger lover, lady Aoi.

== Marriage ==
Aoi no Ue and Hikaru Genji's marriage was the first marriage for Genji which was a political marriage. Furthermore, they were not a well-matched couple and not a love match couple. Aoi no Ue got pregnant in the 9th year of marriage and the relationship started turning out well. Genji has demonstrated his wife, Aoi no Ue, as an angularly dissatisfiedly and cold person, although in fact, her character was kind and warm. Thus, Genji probably did not see the real part of Aoi no Ue during the beginning of the relationship. Later on, Aoi no Ue gave birth to Yūgiri (a boy), although she was murdered by the spirit of Rokujō no Miyasudokoro.

== The Tale of Genji ==
The Tale of Genji was written by Murasaki Shikibu, who was the lady-in-waiting and a noblewoman in the early 11th century. The main character of The Tale of Genji is Hikaru Genji who is known as a super genius and handsome man. Moreover, He is the Japanese emperor's second son. The stories are about the love relationships that Genji was with a wide variety of women. In the written story, Aoi no Ue was possessed by a baleful force, and Genji found that the cause was his former mistress, Lady Rokujō. Lady Rokujō was Genji's first lover, who despite finding him much younger than herself, sought to be his only lover. Later, Genji showed a proclivity to be attracted to other beautiful women and subsequently ended up with 13 other different lovers. Rokujō's hurt pride and rancour smoldered and flared into extreme jealousy and violence. Then, it turned her spirit into a malevolent spirit while she was alive and decided to destroy and pursue Genji's most treasured love, Aoi no Ue. Then Genji heard a voice saying 'Stop for a moment, please. I want to speak to [Prince] Genji'. Genji suddenly realised the voice from ”yorimashi" ( child used as a vessel for a spirit invoked by a shaman) was Lady Rokujō's voice. After he heard the voice and realised that was Lady Rokujō, he was extremely afraid and forced to drive back. Although the attack caused by Lady Rokujō was not on purpose to attack Aoi no Ue and it was an accident triggered between two women. Lady Rokujō felt heavily humiliated and her emotion which was overwrought came out from her body as a spirit flew into the young pregnant Aoi's body. Although it was not only Rokujō's spirit that flew into Aoi no Ue's body but also other aimless and loose spirits trying to find an undefended body. Lady Rokujō died several years later everything happened and Genji reached middle-age, and he decided to mention Lady Rokujō as his second wife. Genji blamed himself because of the negative ending and the fact that it was caused by his mistake. Also, he was affirmed that it might happen again and hoped that she will forgive him.

== Noh and Buddhism ==
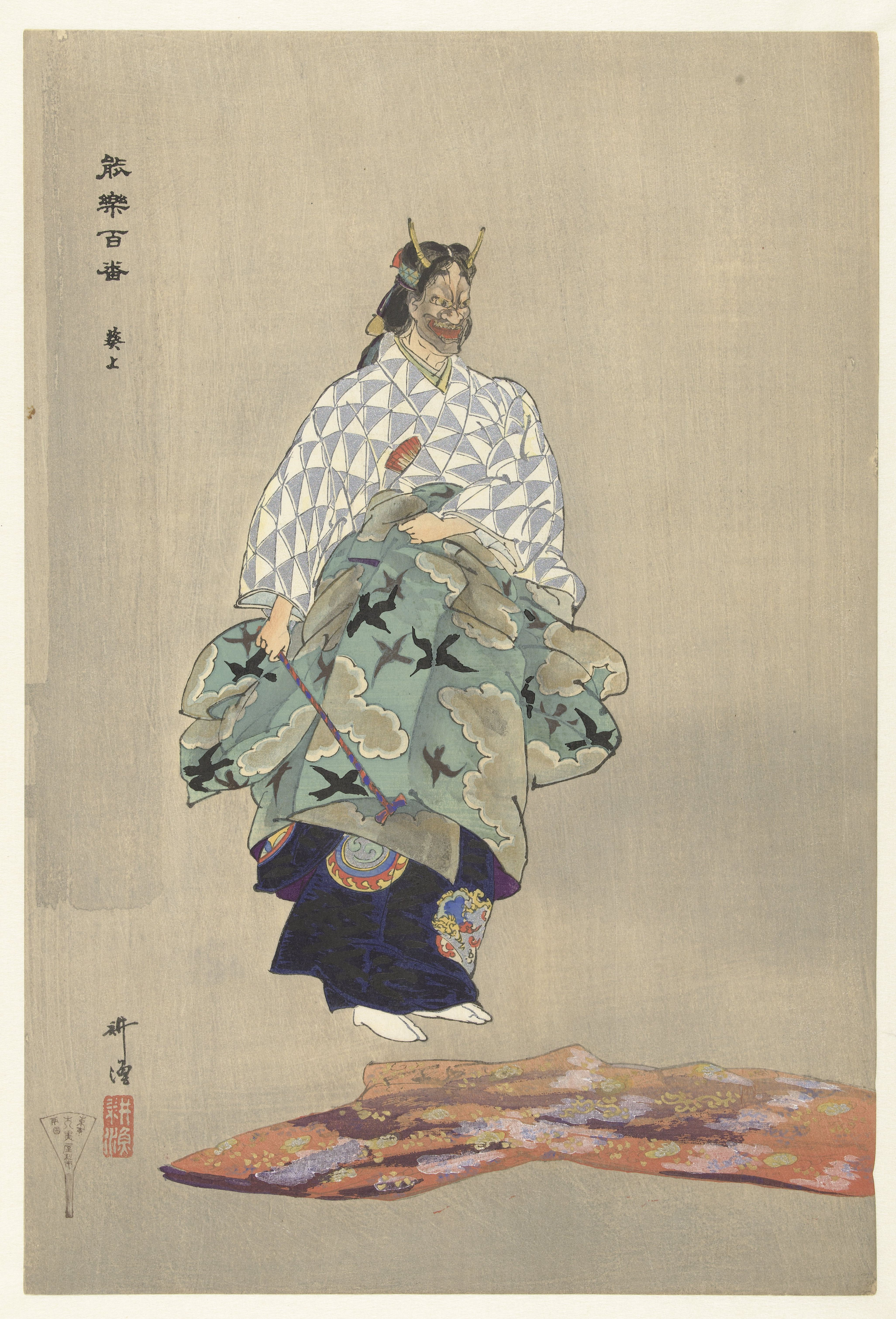
Aoi no Ue. Printed by Kōgyo Tsukioka.

Buddhism is one of the most popular religions and is believed by many people. Buddhism arrived in Japan from Korea and China in the sixth century. Although it was ordinated a thousand years ago in India. More than half of the Buddhists believe that people's illness and sickness, such as misfortunes was from the past spirits, and herbal medicine was one of the medications that were believed to save people. Such as the story of Aoi no Ue in The Tale of Genji, Aoi no Ue's family tried to save her life by the way Buddhism treats other spiritual sicknesses. Lady Murasaki, the author of The Tale of Genji, was a follower of the Mahayana Buddhism herself; many other stories in The Tale of Genji relate to Buddhism. There are a lot of Buddhism stories played in Noh which is traditional Japanese entertainment, and The Tale of Genji is one of the most popular Noh in Japan.

== References in other works ==
Pioneering electronic music composers Joji Yuasa and Toshiro Mayuzumi both composed a piece entitled Aoi no Ue.

Aoi Ue also appears as a character in the Salman Rushdie 1995 novel, The Moor's Last Sigh.
