= Shiryō =

Souls of the dead in Japanese

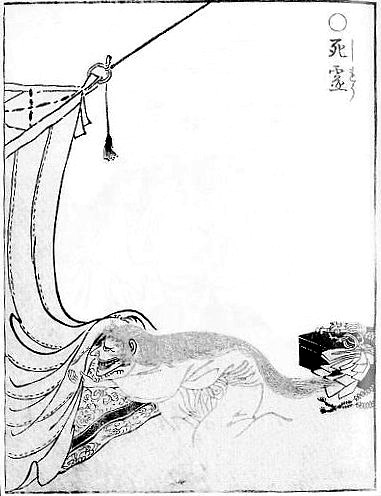
"Shiryō" from the Gazu Hyakki Yagyō by Toriyama Sekien

Shiryō (死霊) are the souls of the dead in Japanese folklore. This contrasts with ikiryō, which are souls of the living.

== Summary ==
Classical literature and folklore material has left many mentions of shiryō, and they have various behaviors. According to the Kōjien, they were considered onryō ('vengeful spirits') that possess humans and perform a tatari (a type of curse), but other than possessing humans and making them suffer like ikiryō do, there are also stories where they chase around those who killed themselves, loiter around the place they died, appear to people they are close to and greet them, and try to kill those who they are close to in order to bring them to the other world.

In the Tōno Monogatari, there was a story in which a man died, and afterward, his shiryō appeared before his daughter and tried to take her away. The daughter became afraid, and she was able to get relatives and friends to come, but even then the father's shiryō appeared to try to take her away. After one month, he finally stopped appearing.
