= The Lady Aoi =

Noh play by Yukio Mishima (1954)

- Written by: Yukio Mishima
- Original language: Japanese
- Genre: Noh
- Setting: A hospital in modern Japan

Premiere

The Lady Aoi is a play written by Yukio Mishima in 1954, which appears in his Five Modern Noh Plays. It modernizes the noh drama Aoi no Ue.

== English Version ==
Donald Keene has translated this play into English.

== Notable productions ==
Bahram Beyzai produced this play in Persian in Tehran in 1998.
