= Aoi no Ue (play) =

Muromachi period Japanese Noh play by Zeami Motokiyo

葵上
- English title: Lady Aoi
- Written by: Zeami Motokiyo
- Category: 4th — miscellaneous
- Mood: mugen
- Style: geki
- Characters: shite Rokujo no Miyasudokoro (Maejite/Nochijite) tsure the shaman Teruhi waki the priest Kojihiri of Yokawa wakizure Cour official
- Place: Imperial Palace, Heian-kyō
- Time: Heian period
- Sources: Genji monogatari
- Schools: all

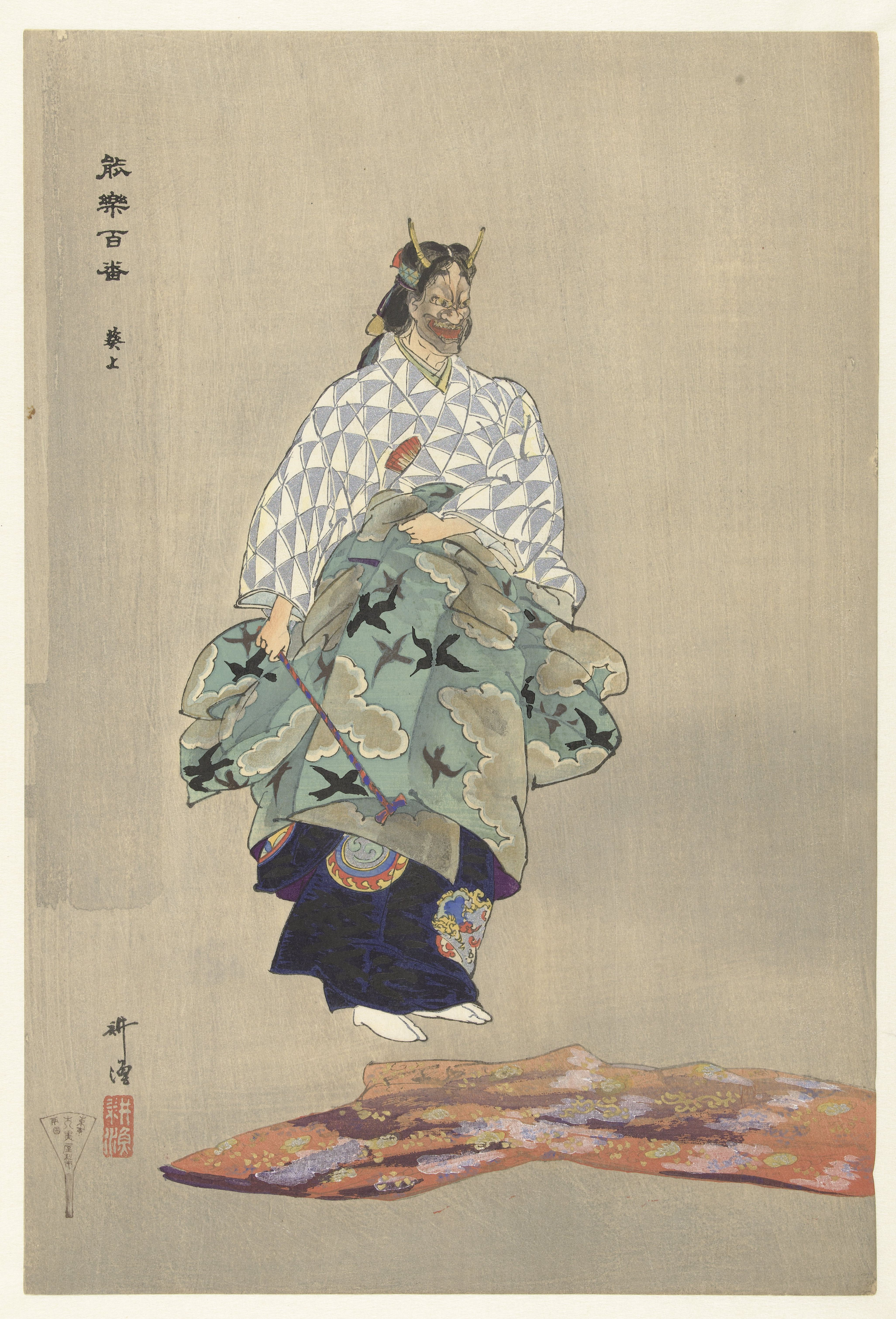
Aoi no Ue. Printed by Kōgyo Tsukioka.

Aoi no Ue (能 葵上, Lady Aoi) is a Muromachi period Japanese Noh play based on the character Lady Aoi from the Heian period novel The Tale of Genji. It is an example of the fourth category of "miscellaneous" Noh plays. Aoi no Ue was the first of many Noh plays based on The Tale of Genji. It is sometimes attributed to Zeami Motokiyo or to his son-in-law Zenchiku; the extant version of the text is likely a reworking of a version written for the troupe of a contemporary, Inuō.

== Play ==
In the backstory, Prince Genji, who was married to his wife Lady Aoi at a young age, has taken a mistress, Lady Rokujo. Lady Rokujo had been married to the crown prince, but his death had left a much less powerful widow. Rokujo had previously destroyed another mistress of Genji through a jealous apparition. Following an episode in which she is humiliated in public by Lady Aoi, Rokujo is enraged to discover that Aoi is pregnant. Genji begins ignoring Rokujo, and in her jealousy her living spirit leaves her body and possesses Lady Aoi, resulting in Aoi's falling sick – the starting-point of the play.

The action of the play focuses on a miko (female shaman) and a priest summoning and exorcising the spirit of Lady Rokujo from her attack on the body of Lady Aoi. Aoi does not appear on stage - rather, an empty kimono serves to represent her. Rokujo initially appears in a sympathetic vein, lamenting the transience of life and beauty: “We are brittle as the leaves of the bashō / As fleeting as foam on the sea...now I wither like the Morning Glory”. Then, seized with anger, she renews her attack on Aoi, whose deteriorating condition leads to the summoning of the priest/saint and his incantations finally lay Rokujo’s angry spirit to rest.

Noh roles being historically played by men, the first woman to play the lead role in Aoi no Ue was Uzawa Hisa..

== Analysis ==
- Victor Turner, in The Anthropology of Performance, wrote about the relationship between The Tale of Genji and Aoi no Ue, calling them different kinds of metaperformance and discussing the difference between the story in a novel and in a theatre.
- Yukio Mishima did a modern adaptation in Freudian terms, which was set in a hospital.

== See also ==
- The Lady Aoi
