= Kōgyo Tsukioka =

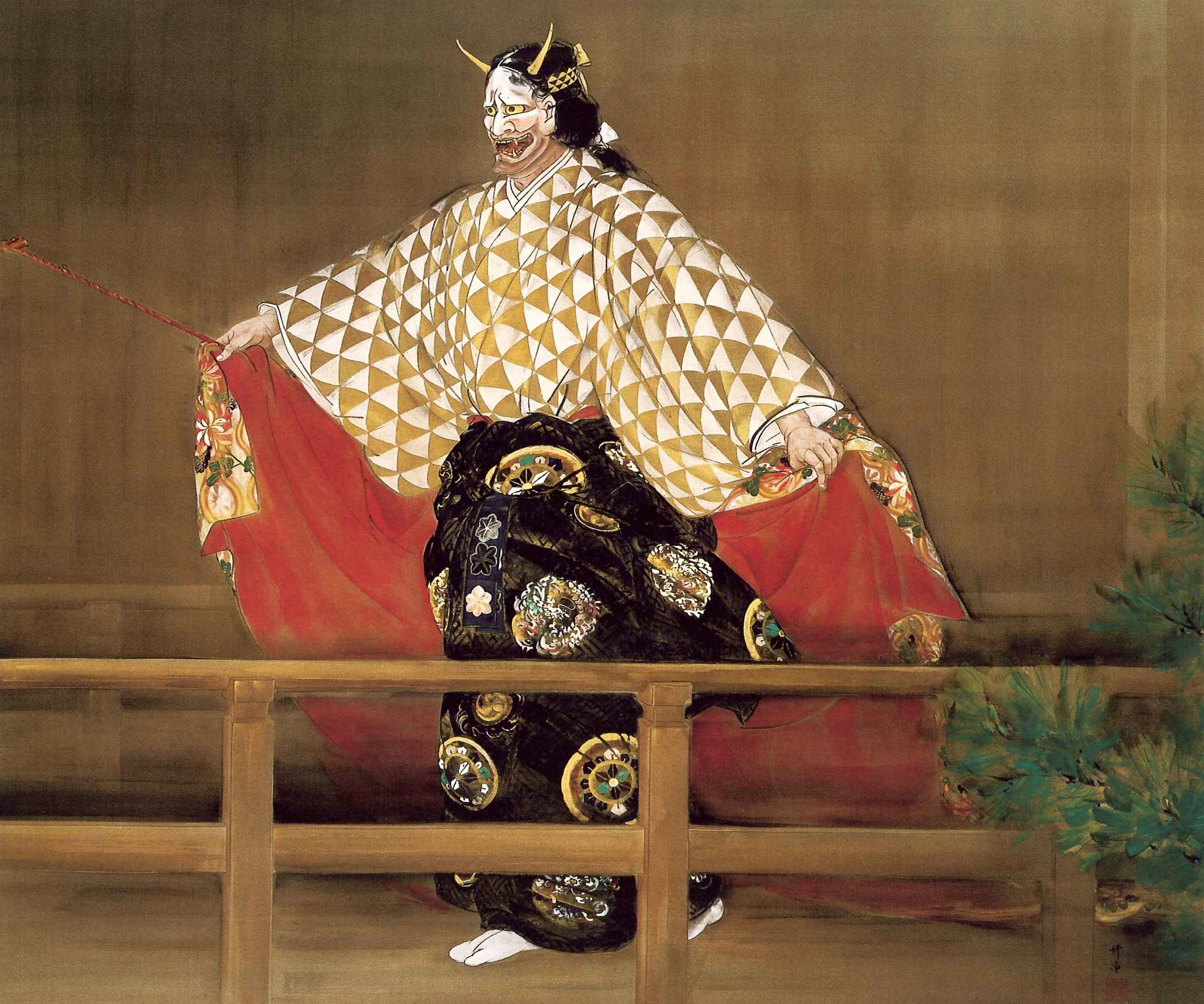
- Dōjōji (道成寺), painting on silk, 148.5 x 176.3 cm, by Tsukioka Kogyo
- Born: April 18, 1869; Tokyo, Japan
- Died: February 25, 1927 (aged 57)
- Known for: Ukiyo-e

Kōgyo Tsukioka (月岡 耕漁, Tsukioka Kōgyo), sometimes called Kōgyo Sakamaki (坂巻 耕漁, Sakamaki Kōgyo), (April 18, 1869 – February 25, 1927) was a Japanese artist of the Meiji era. He was a student and adopted son of Tsukioka Yoshitoshi, and also studied with Ogata Gekkō. Although Kōgyo sometimes painted other subjects, for most of his career he made pictures of Japanese Noh theatre, either as large-scale paintings or colored woodblock prints. Many of the latter were published in series and sold as multi-volume sets. Some sets, such as Nōgaku zue, have been preserved as albums in their original bindings, including accordion-style bindings known as orihon, while other sets such as Nōga taikan, were issued in sewn bindings known as yamato toji. Although most bound sets belong to institutional collections, individual prints by Kōgyo can still be found through dealers specializing in Japanese prints.

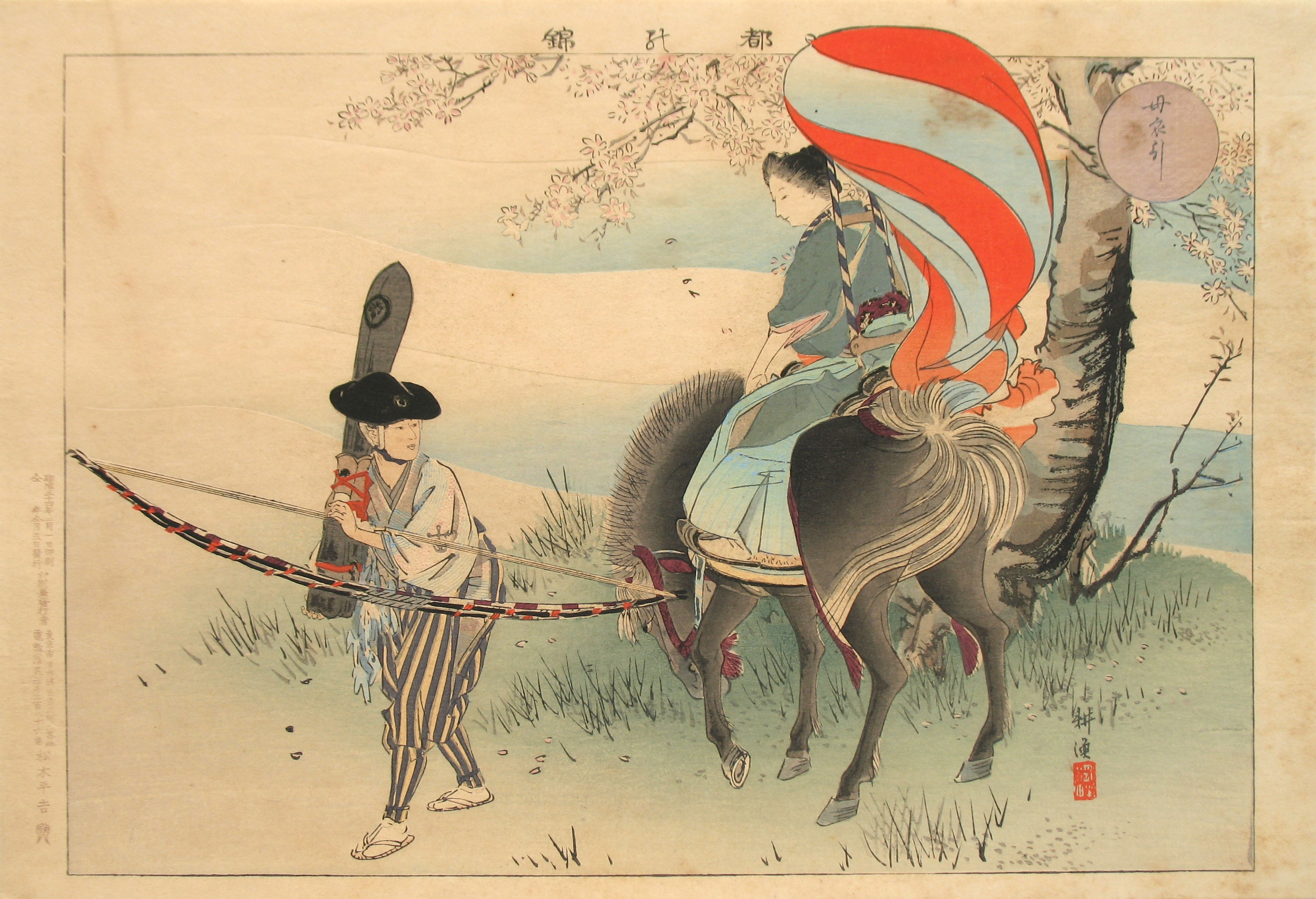
Horse Riding Competition (母衣引, Horohiki), 1901, one of a series of 12 prints entitled Brocades of the Capital (都の錦, Miyako no nishiki)

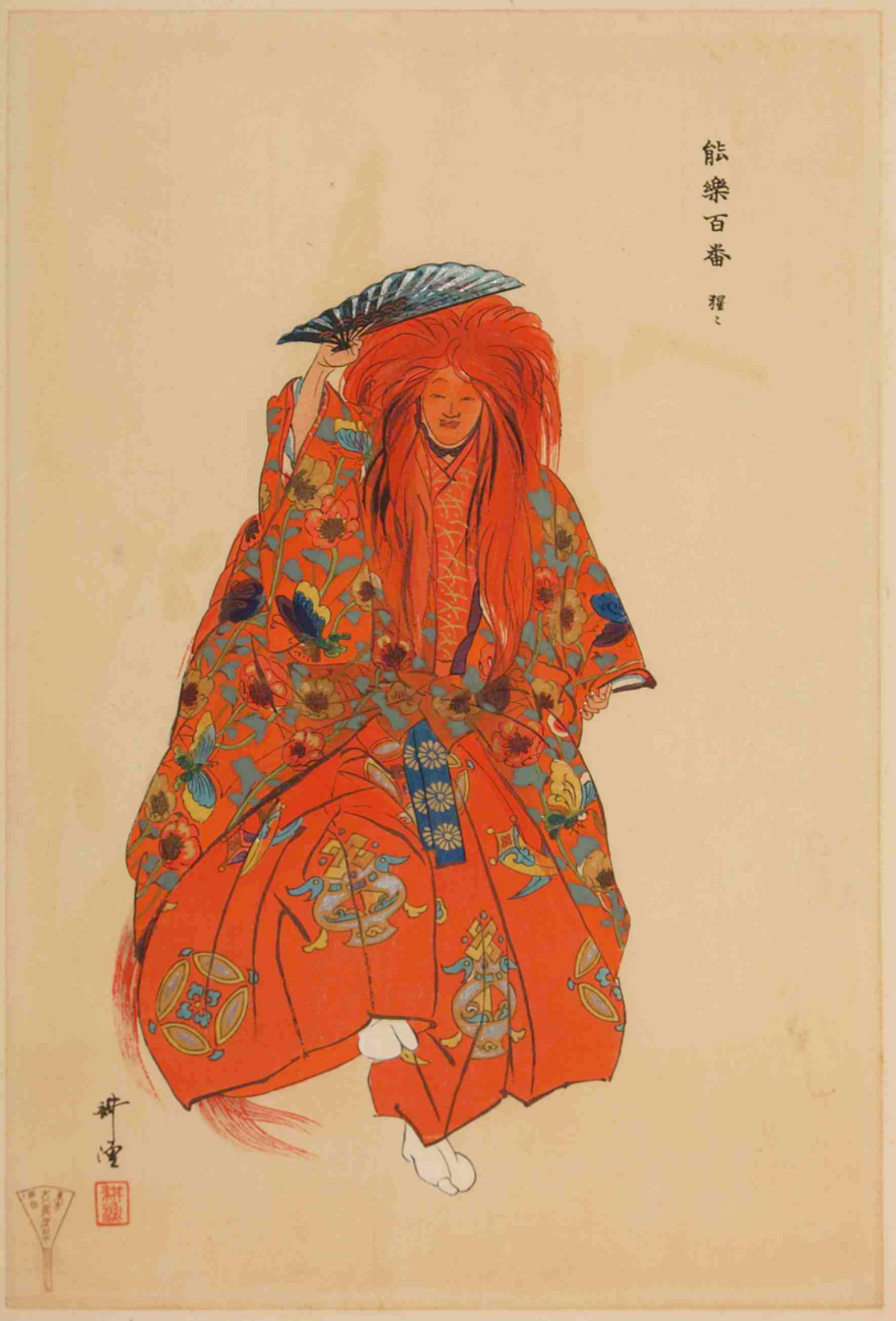
“Shōjō” ukiyo-e by Kōgyo Tsukioka, from the series “Nohgaku Hyakuban”, 1922-25)
