= Murasaki Shikibu =

Japanese novelist and poet (c. 973 – c. 1014)

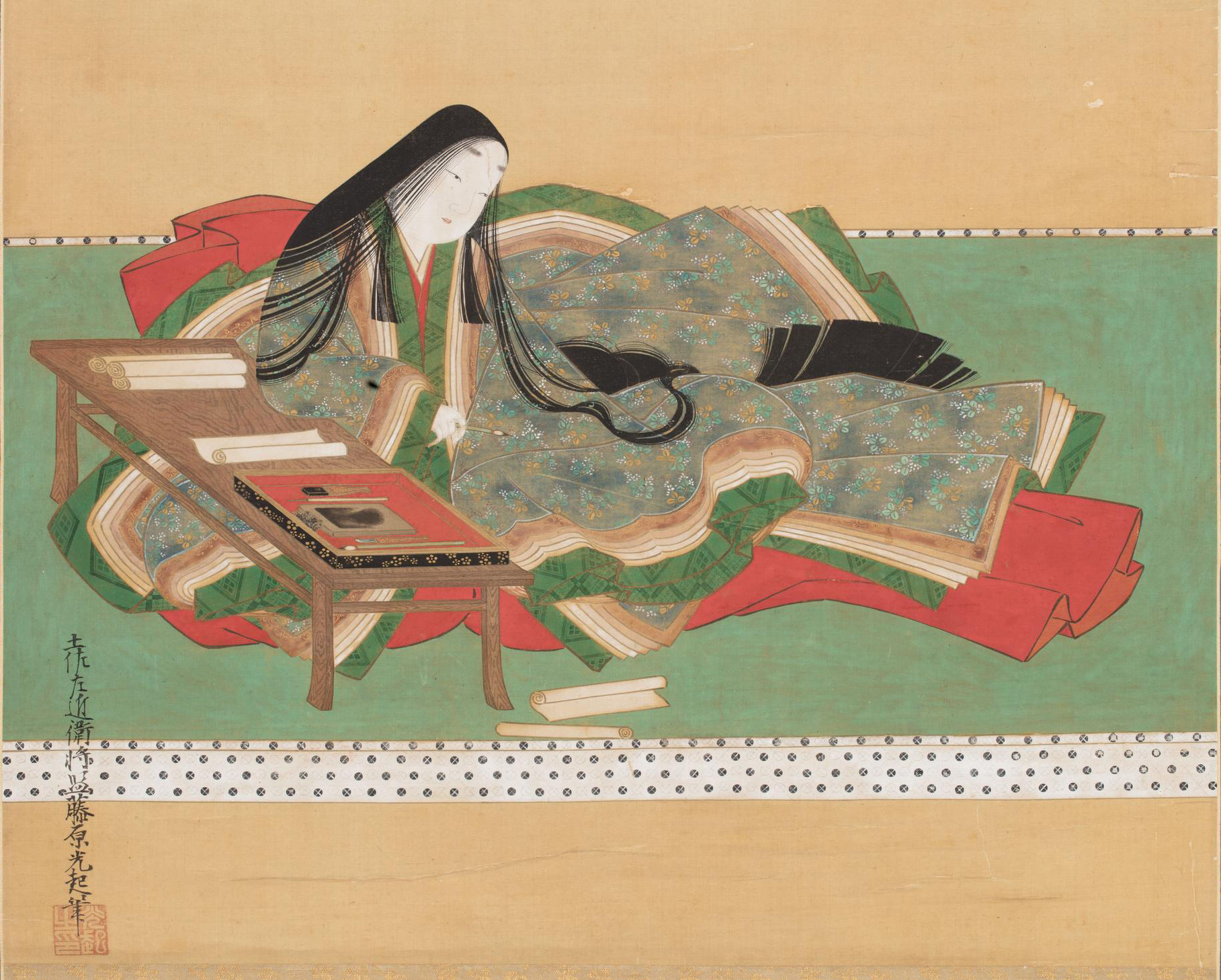
17th-century depiction of Murasaki by Tosa Mitsuoki

Murasaki Shikibu (紫式部; (Note: Shikibu (式部; [ɕi̥.kʲiꜜ.bɯ]) is a title for ladies-in-waiting. It is originally the title for a daughter of a deputy at the Ministry of Ceremonial Affairs (式部省, Shikibu-shō; also the short name for this ministry).) [mɯ.ɾa.sa.kʲi ɕi̥.kiꜜ.bɯ, -ɕi̥ꜜ.kʲi-]; c. 973 – c. 1014 or 1025), or Shijo (紫女; [ɕiꜜ.(d)ʑo]; lit. 'Lady Murasaki'), was a Japanese novelist, poet and lady-in-waiting at the Imperial court in the Heian period. She was best known as the author of The Tale of Genji, widely considered to be one of the world's first novels, written in Japanese between about 1000 and 1012. Murasaki Shikibu is a descriptive name; her personal name is unknown, but she may have been Fujiwara no Kaoruko (藤原香子), who was mentioned in a 1007 court diary as an imperial lady-in-waiting.

Heian women were traditionally excluded from learning Chinese, the written language of government, but Murasaki, raised in her erudite father's household, showed a precocious aptitude for the Chinese classics and managed to acquire fluency. She married in her mid-to-late twenties and gave birth to a daughter, Daini no Sanmi. Her husband died after two years of marriage. It is uncertain when she began to write The Tale of Genji, but it was probably while she was married or shortly after she was widowed. In about 1005, she was invited to serve as a lady-in-waiting to Empress Shōshi at the Imperial court by Fujiwara no Michinaga, probably because of her reputation as a writer. She continued to write during her service, adding scenes from court life to her work. After five or six years, she left court and retired with Shōshi to the Lake Biwa region. Scholars differ on the year of her death; although most agree on 1014, others have suggested she was alive in 1025.

Murasaki wrote The Diary of Lady Murasaki, The Tale of Genji, and a volume of poetry. Within a decade of its completion, Genji was distributed throughout the provinces; within a century it was recognized as a classic of Japanese literature and had become a subject of scholarly criticism. Between 1925 and 1933, The Tale of Genji was published in English. Scholars continue to recognize the importance of her work, which reflects Heian court society at its peak. Since the 13th century her works have been illustrated by Japanese artists and well-known ukiyo-e woodblock masters.

== Early life ==
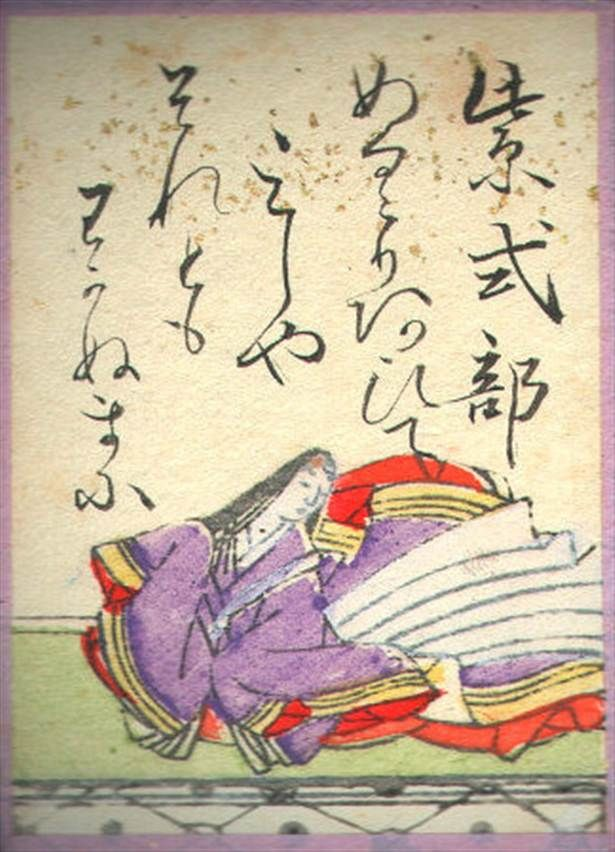
Designated one of the One Hundred Poets, Murasaki is shown dressed in a violet kimono, the color associated with her name, in this Edo period illustration.

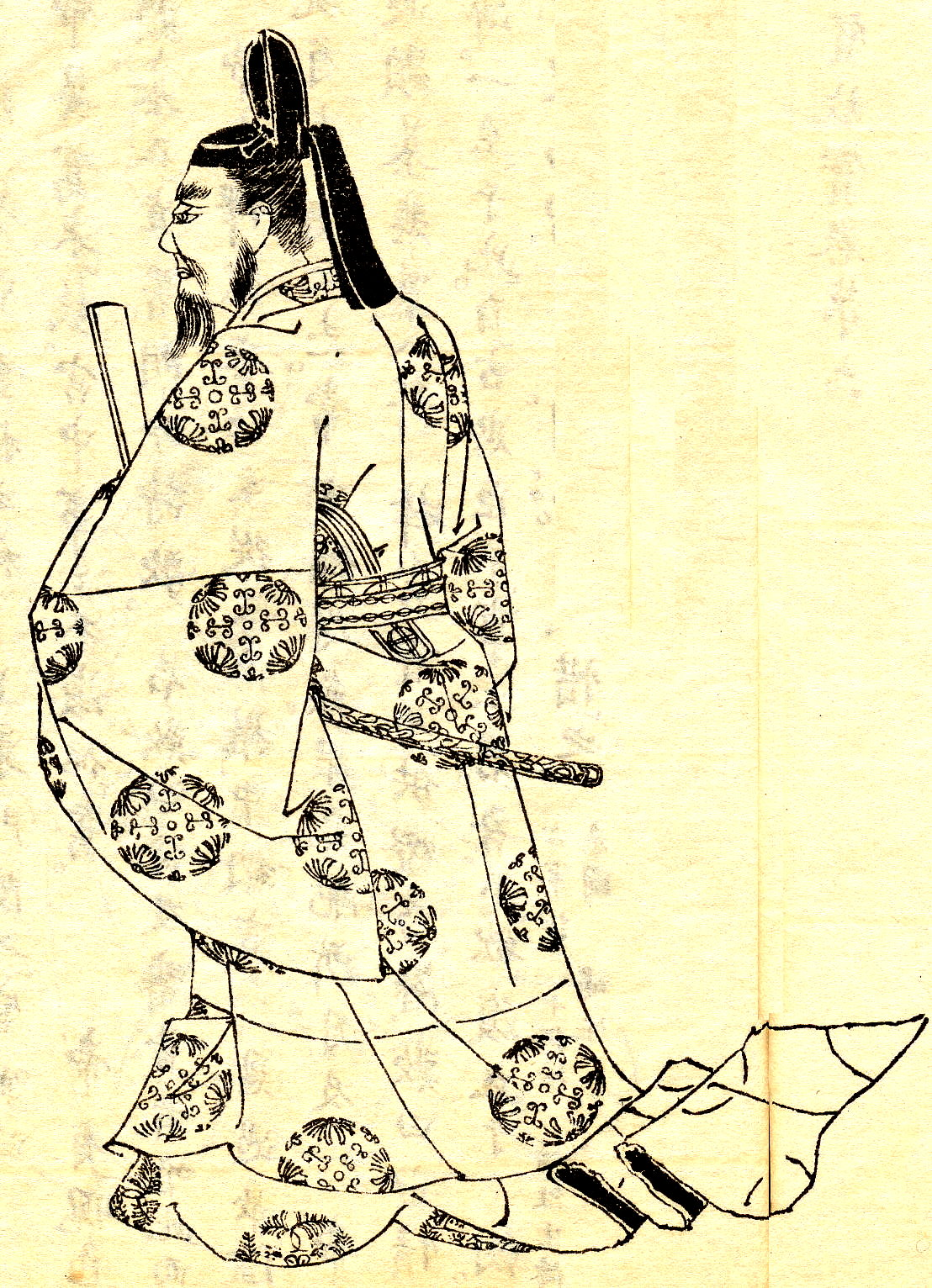
Fujiwara no Michinaga (19th century monochrome illustration by Kikuchi Yōsai) became extremely powerful during Murasaki's lifetime.

Murasaki Shikibu was born c. 973 (Note: Bowring believes her date of birth most likely to have been 973; Mulhern places it somewhere between 970 and 978, and Waley states it was 978. See Bowring (2004), 4; Mulhern (1994), 257; Waley (1960), vii.) in Heian-kyō, Japan, into the northern Fujiwara clan descending from Fujiwara no Yoshifusa, the first 9th century Fujiwara regent. The Fujiwara clan dominated court politics until the end of the 11th century through strategically marrying their daughters into the imperial family and the use of regencies. In the late 10th century and early 11th century, Fujiwara no Michinaga, the so-called Mido Kampaku, arranged his four daughters into marriages with emperors, giving him unprecedented power. Murasaki's great-grandfather, Fujiwara no Kanesuke, had been in the top tier of the aristocracy, but her branch of the family gradually lost power and by the time of Murasaki's birth was at the middle to lower ranks of the Heian aristocracy—the level of provincial governors. The lower ranks of the nobility were typically posted away from court to undesirable positions in the provinces, exiled from the centralized power and court in Kyoto.

Despite the loss of status, the family had a reputation among the literati through Murasaki's paternal great-grandfather and grandfather, both of whom were well-known poets. Her great-grandfather, Fujiwara no Kanesuke, had 56 poems included in 13 of the Twenty-one Imperial Anthologies, the Collections of Thirty-six Poets and the Yamato Monogatari (Tales of Yamato). Her great-grandfather and grandfather were both friendly with Ki no Tsurayuki, who became notable for popularizing Japanese-language verse. Her father, Fujiwara no Tametoki, attended the State Academy (Daigaku-ryō) and became a well-respected scholar of Chinese classics and poetry; his own verse was anthologized. He entered public service around 968 as a minor official and was given a governorship in 996, staying in service until about 1018. Murasaki's mother was descended from the same branch of northern Fujiwara as Tametoki. The couple had three children, a son and two daughters.

In the Heian era the use of names, insofar as they were recorded, did not follow a modern pattern. A court lady, as well as being known by the title of her own position, if any, took a name referring to the rank or title of a male relative. Thus "Shikibu" is not a modern surname, but refers to Shikibu-shō, the Ministry of Ceremonials where Murasaki's father was a functionary. "Murasaki", an additional name possibly derived from the color violet associated with wisteria, the meaning of the word fuji (an element of her clan name), may have been bestowed on her at court in reference to the name she herself had given to the main female character in "Genji". Michinaga mentions the names of several ladies-in-waiting in a 1007 diary entry; one, Fujiwara no Kaoruko (Kyōshi), may be Murasaki's personal name. (Note: Seven women were named in the entry, with the actual names of four women known. Of the remaining three women, one was not a Fujiwara, one held a high rank and therefore had to be older, leaving the possibility that the third, Fujiwara no Kaoruko, was Murasaki. See Tsunoda (1963), 1–27.)

In Heian-era Japan, husbands and wives kept separate households; children were raised with their mothers, although the patrilineal system was still followed. Murasaki was unconventional because she lived in her father's household, most likely on Teramachi Street in Kyoto, with her younger brother Nobunori. Their mother died, perhaps in childbirth, when they were quite young. Murasaki had at least three half-siblings raised with their mothers; she was very close to one sister who died in her twenties.

Murasaki was born at a period when Japan was becoming more isolated, after missions to China had ended and a stronger national culture was emerging. In the 9th and 10th centuries, Japanese gradually became a written language through the development of kana, a syllabary based on abbreviations of Chinese characters. In Murasaki's lifetime, men continued to write formally in Chinese, but kana became the written language of intimacy and of noblewomen, setting the foundation for unique forms of Japanese literature.

Chinese was taught to Murasaki's brother as preparation for a career in government, and during her childhood, living in her father's household, she learned and became proficient in classical Chinese. In her diary she wrote, "When my brother ... was a young boy learning the Chinese classics, I was in the habit of listening to him and I became unusually proficient at understanding those passages that he found too difficult to understand and memorize. Father, a most learned man, was always regretting the fact: 'Just my luck,' he would say, 'What a pity she was not born a man!'" With her brother she studied Chinese literature, and she probably also received instruction in more traditional subjects such as music, calligraphy and Japanese poetry. Murasaki's education was unorthodox. Louis Perez explains in The History of Japan that "Women ... were thought to be incapable of real intelligence and therefore were not educated in Chinese." Murasaki was aware that others saw her as "pretentious, awkward, difficult to approach, prickly, too fond of her tales, haughty, prone to versifying, disdainful, cantankerous and scornful". Asian literature scholar Thomas Inge believes she had "a forceful personality that seldom won her friends."

== Marriage ==
Aristocratic Heian women lived restricted and secluded lives, allowed to speak to men only when they were close relatives or household members. Murasaki's autobiographical poetry shows that she socialized with women but had limited contact with men other than her father and brother; she often exchanged poetry with women but never with men. Unlike most noblewomen of her status, however, she did not marry on reaching puberty; instead she stayed in her father's household until her mid-twenties or perhaps even to her early thirties.

In 996 when her father was posted to a four-year governorship in Echizen Province (modern Fukui prefecture), Murasaki went with him, although it was uncommon for a noblewoman of the period to travel such a distance that could take as long as five days. She returned to Kyoto, probably in 998, to marry her father's friend Fujiwara no Nobutaka, a much older second cousin. Descended from the same branch of the Fujiwara clan, he was a court functionary and bureaucrat at the Ministry of Ceremonials, with a reputation for dressing extravagantly and as a talented dancer. In his late forties at the time of their marriage, he had multiple households with an unknown number of wives and offspring. Gregarious and well-known at court, he was involved in numerous romantic relationships that may have continued after his marriage to Murasaki. As was customary, she would have remained in her father's household where her husband would have visited her. Nobutaka had been granted more than one governorship, and by the time of his marriage to Murasaki he was probably quite wealthy. Interpretations of their marital relationship differ among scholars: Richard Bowring suggests a harmonious marriage, while Japanese literature scholar Haruo Shirane finds evidence of resentment towards her husband in Murasaki’s poems.

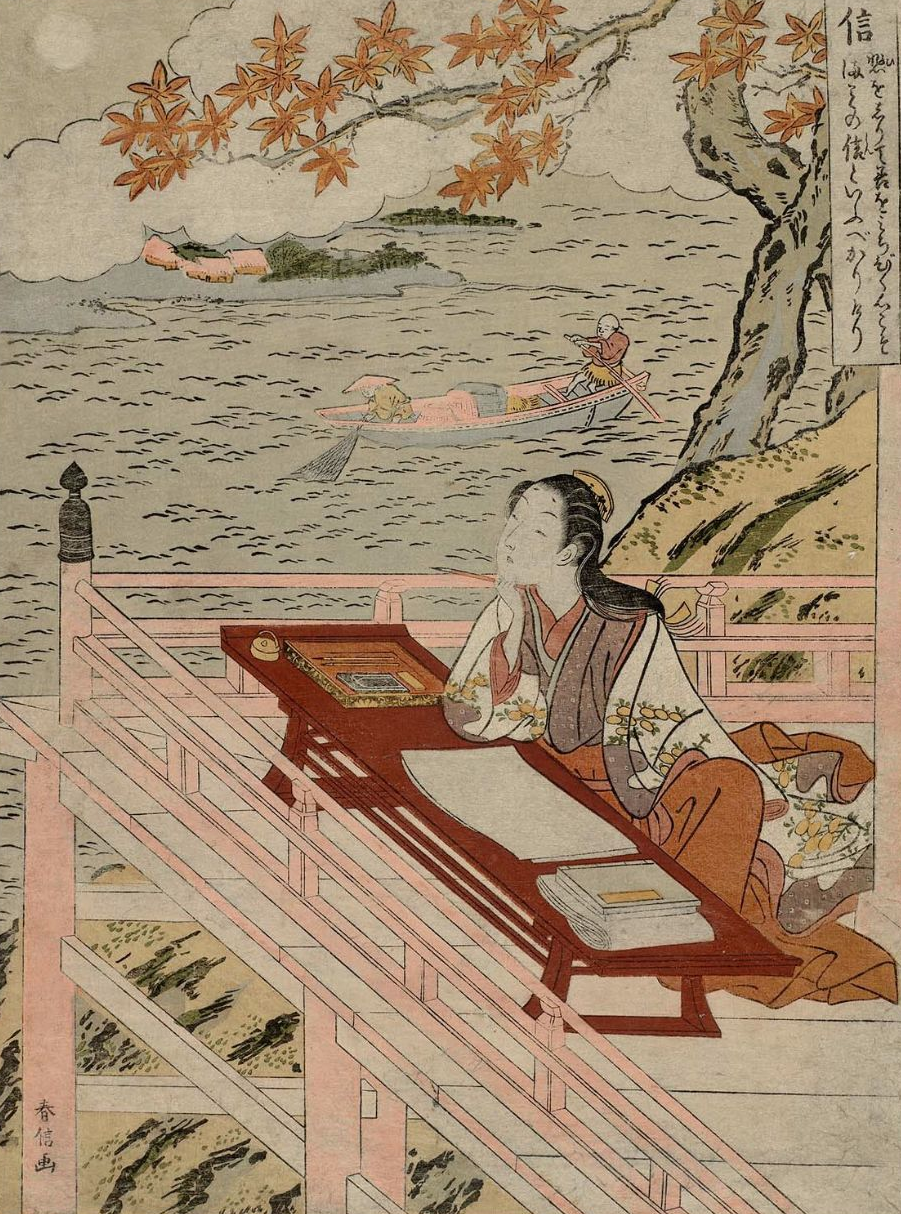
Murasaki shown writing at her desk at Ishiyama-dera inspired by the Moon, ukiyo-e by Suzuki Harunobu, c. 1767

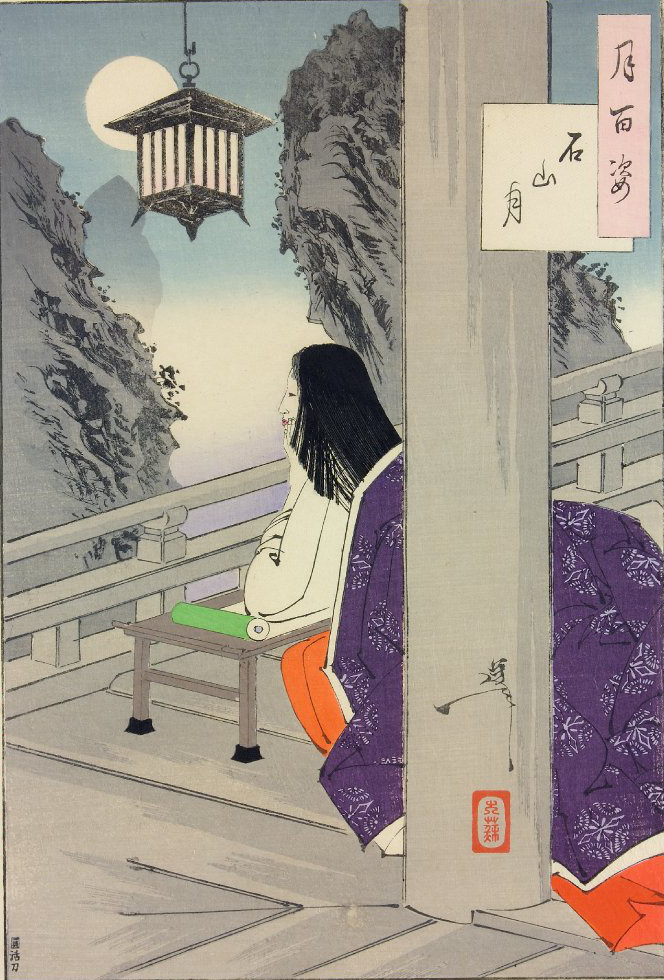
Murasaki depicted gazing at the Moon for inspiration at Ishiyama-dera by Yoshitoshi (1889)

The couple's daughter, Kenshi (Kataiko), was born in 999. Two years later Nobutaka died during a cholera epidemic. As a married woman Murasaki would have had servants to run the household and care for her daughter, giving her ample leisure time. She enjoyed reading and had access to romances (monogatari) such as The Tale of the Bamboo Cutter and The Tales of Ise. Scholars believe she may have started writing The Tale of Genji before her husband's death; it is known she was writing after she was widowed, perhaps in a state of grief. In her diary she describes her feelings after her husband's death: "I felt depressed and confused. For some years I had existed from day to day in listless fashion ... doing little more than registering the passage of time ... The thought of my continuing loneliness was quite unbearable".

According to legend, Murasaki retreated to Ishiyama-dera at Lake Biwa, where she was inspired to write The Tale of Genji on an August night while looking at the Moon. Although scholars dismiss the factual basis of the story of her retreat, Japanese artists often depicted her at Ishiyama Temple staring at the Moon for inspiration. She may have been commissioned to write the story and may have known an exiled courtier in a similar position to her hero Prince Genji. Murasaki would have distributed newly written chapters of Genji to friends who in turn would have re-copied them and passed them on. By this practice the story became known and she gained a reputation as an author.

In her early to mid-thirties, she became a lady-in-waiting (nyōbō) at court, most likely because of her reputation as an author. Chieko Mulhern writes in Japanese Women Writers, a Biocritical Sourcebook that scholars have wondered why Murasaki made such a move at a comparatively late period in her life. Her diary evidences that she exchanged poetry with Michinaga after her husband's death, leading to speculation that the two may have been lovers. Bowring sees no evidence that she was brought to court as Michinaga's concubine, although he did bring her to court without following official channels. Mulhern thinks Michinaga wanted to have Murasaki at court to educate his daughter Shōshi.

== Court life ==
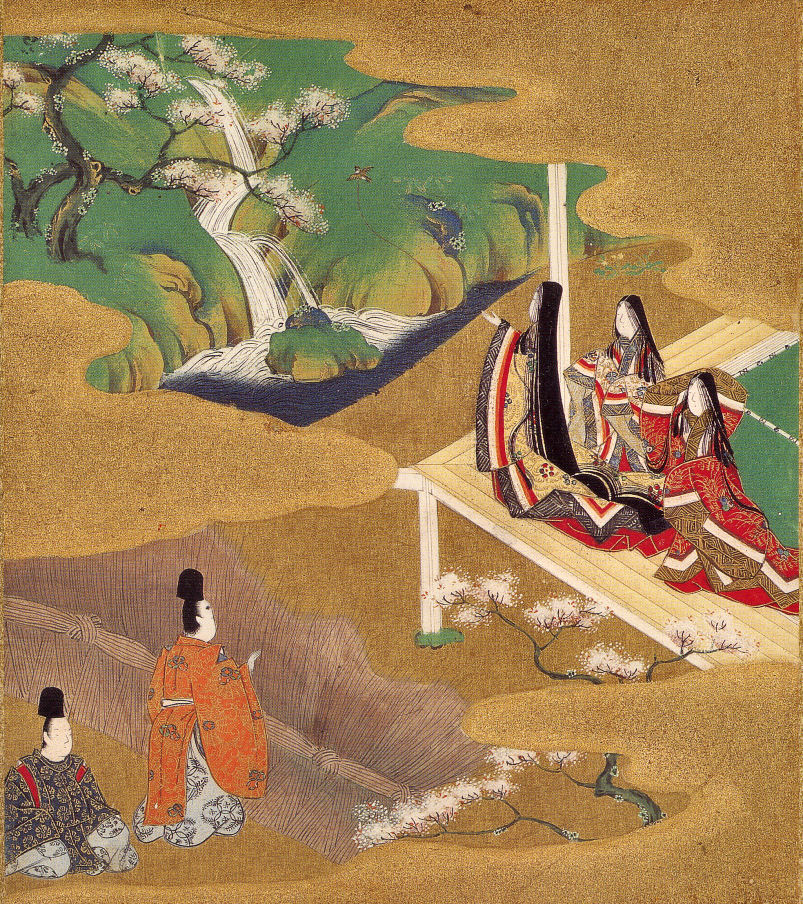
A Tosa-school mid- to late 17th century yamato-e of Heian courtiers by Tosa Mitsuoki, shows women dressed in jūnihitoe and with floor-length hair.

Heian culture and court life reached a peak early in the 11th century. The population of Kyoto grew to around 100,000 as the nobility became increasingly isolated at the Heian Palace in government posts and court service. Courtiers became overly refined with little to do, insulated from reality, preoccupied with the minutiae of court life, turning to artistic endeavors. Emotions were commonly expressed through the artistic use of textiles, fragrances, calligraphy, colored paper, poetry, and layering of clothing in pleasing color combinations—according to mood and season. Those who showed an inability to follow conventional aesthetics quickly lost popularity, particularly at court. Popular pastimes for Heian noblewomen—who adhered to rigid fashions of floor-length hair, whitened skin and blackened teeth—included having love affairs, writing poetry and keeping diaries. The literature that Heian court women wrote is recognized as some of the earliest and among the best literature written in Japanese canon.

=== Rival courts and women poets ===
When in 995 Michinaga's two brothers Fujiwara no Michitaka and Fujiwara no Michikane died, leaving the regency vacant, Michinaga quickly won a power struggle against his nephew Fujiwara no Korechika (brother to Teishi, Emperor Ichijō's wife), and, aided by his sister Senshi, he assumed power. Teishi had supported her brother Korechika, who was discredited and banished from court in 996 following a scandal involving his shooting at the retired Emperor Kazan, causing her to lose power. Four years later Michinaga sent Shōshi, his eldest daughter, to Emperor Ichijō's harem when she was about 12. A year after placing Shōshi in the imperial harem, in an effort to undermine Teishi's influence and increase Shōshi's standing, Michinaga had her named Empress although Teishi already held the title. As historian Donald Shively explains, "Michinaga shocked even his admirers by arranging for the unprecedented appointment of Teishi (or Sadako) and Shōshi as concurrent empresses of the same emperor, Teishi holding the usual title of "Lustrous Heir-bearer" kōgō and Shōshi that of "Inner Palatine" (chūgū), a toponymically derived equivalent coined for the occasion". About five years later, Michinaga brought Murasaki to Shōshi's court, in a position that Bowring describes as a companion-tutor.

Women of high status lived in seclusion at court and, through strategic marriages, were used to gain political power for their families. In the case of Shōshi and other such marriages to members of the imperial clan, it enabled the woman's clan to exercise influence over the emperor—this was how Michinaga, and other Fujiwara Regents, achieved their power. Despite their seclusion, some women wielded considerable influence, often achieved through competitive salons, dependent on the quality of those attending. Ichijō's mother and Michinaga's sister, Senshi, had an influential salon, and Michinaga probably wanted Shōshi to surround herself with skilled women such as Murasaki to build a rival salon.

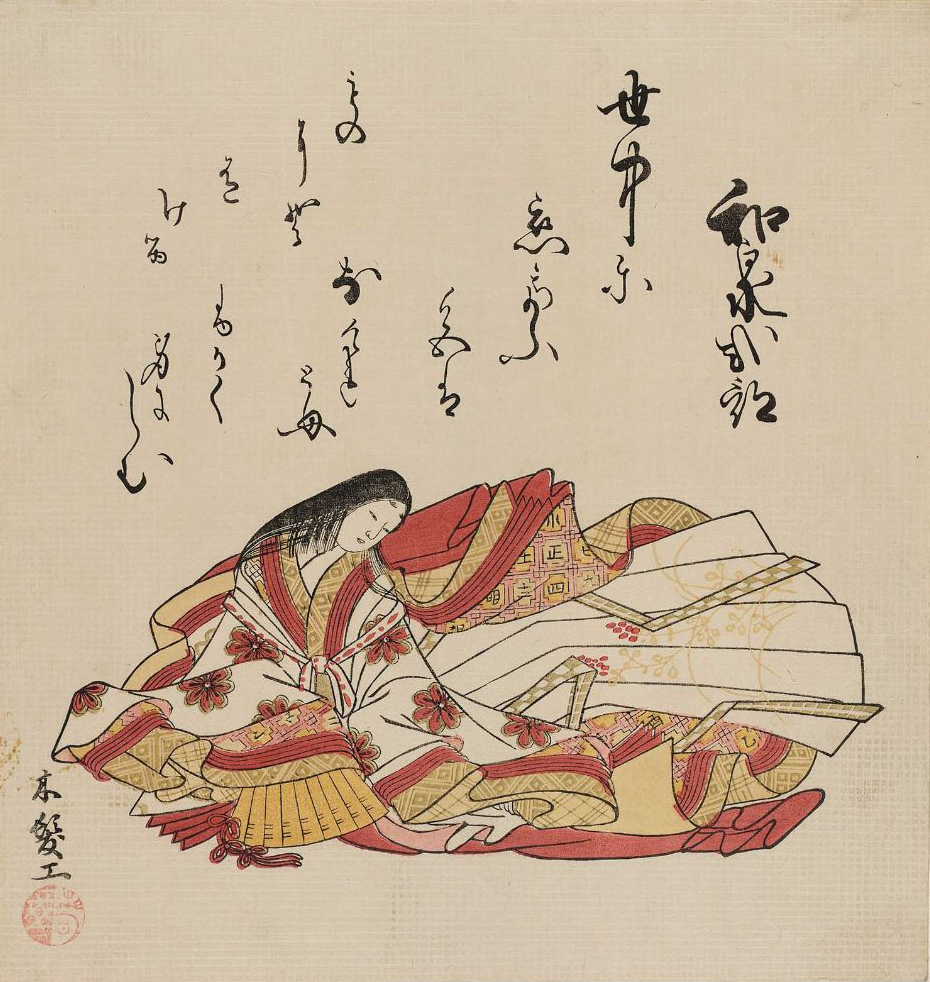
Izumi Shikibu, shown here in a Kusazōshi by Komatsuken from about 1765, was a poet at Empress Teishi's court.

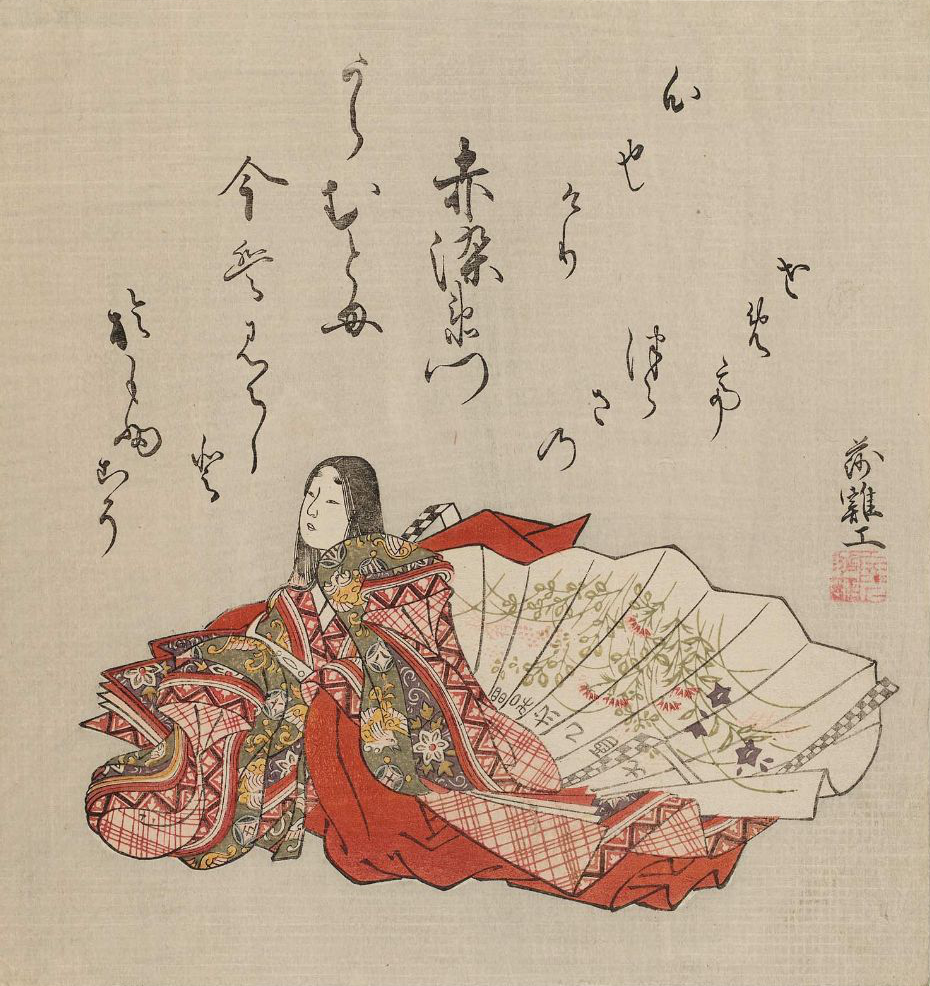
Akazome Emon, a rival court poet, depicted in a c. 1765 ink and color Kusazōshi by Komatsuken

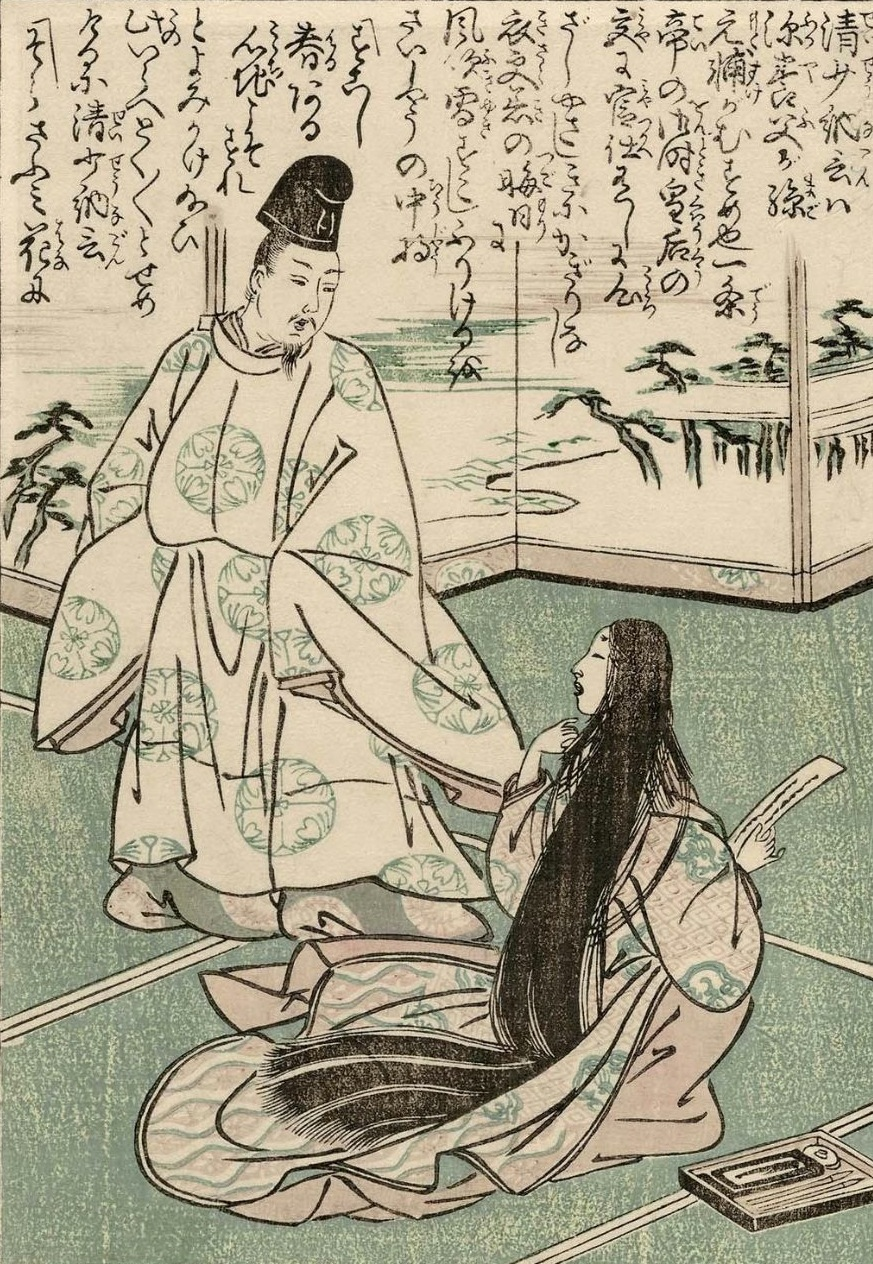
Sei Shōnagon, Murasaki's court rival, depicted in a Benizuri-e (c. 1760s)

Shōshi was 16 to 19 when Murasaki joined her court, either in 1005 or 1006. According to Arthur Waley, Shōshi was a serious-minded young lady, whose living arrangements were divided between her father's household and her court at the Imperial Palace. She gathered around her talented women writers such as Izumi Shikibu and Akazome Emon—the author of an early vernacular history, The Tale of Flowering Fortunes. The rivalry that existed among the women is evident in Murasaki's diary, where she wrote disparagingly of Izumi: "Izumi Shikibu is an amusing letter-writer; but there is something not very satisfactory about her. She has a gift for dashing off informal compositions in a careless running-hand; but in poetry she needs either an interesting subject or some classic model to imitate. Indeed it does not seem to me that in herself she is really a poet at all."

Sei Shōnagon, author of The Pillow Book, had been in service as lady-in-waiting to Teishi when Shōshi came to court; it is possible that Murasaki was invited to Shōshi's court as a rival to Shōnagon. Teishi died in 1001, before Murasaki entered service with Shōshi, so the two writers were not there concurrently, but Murasaki, who wrote about Shōnagon in her diary, certainly knew of her, and to an extent was influenced by her. Shōnagon's The Pillow Book may have been commissioned as a type of propaganda to highlight Teishi's court, known for its educated ladies-in-waiting. Japanese literature scholar Joshua Mostow believes Michinaga provided Murasaki to Shōshi as an equally or better educated woman, so as to showcase Shōshi's court in a similar manner.

The two writers had different temperaments: Shōnagon was witty, clever, and outspoken; Murasaki was withdrawn and sensitive. Entries in Murasaki's diary show that the two may not have been on good terms. Murasaki wrote, "Sei Shōnagon ... was dreadfully conceited. She thought herself so clever, littered her writing with Chinese characters, [which] left a great deal to be desired." Keene thinks that Murasaki's impression of Shōnagon could have been influenced by Shōshi and the women at her court, as Shōnagon served Shōshi's rival empress. Furthermore, he believes Murasaki was brought to court to write Genji in response to Shōnagon's popular Pillow Book. Murasaki contrasted herself to Shōnagon in a variety of ways. She denigrated the pillow book genre and, unlike Shōnagon, who flaunted her knowledge of Chinese, Murasaki pretended to not know the language, regarding it as pretentious and affected.

=== "The Lady of the Chronicles" ===
Although the popularity of the Chinese language diminished in the late Heian era, Chinese ballads continued to be popular, including those written by Bai Juyi. Murasaki taught Chinese to Shōshi who was interested in Chinese art and Juyi's ballads. Upon becoming Empress, Shōshi installed screens decorated with Chinese script, causing outrage because written Chinese was considered the language of men, far removed from the women's quarters. The study of Chinese was thought to be unladylike and went against the notion that only men should have access to the literature. Women were supposed to read and write only in Japanese, which separated them through language from government and the power structure. Murasaki, with her unconventional classical Chinese education, was one of the few women available to teach Shōshi classical Chinese. Bowring writes it was "almost subversive" that Murasaki knew Chinese and taught the language to Shōshi. Murasaki, who was reticent about her Chinese education, held the lessons between the two women in secret, writing in her diary, "Since last summer ... very secretly, in odd moments when there happened to be no one about, I have been reading with Her Majesty ... There has of course been no question of formal lessons ... I have thought it best to say nothing about the matter to anybody."

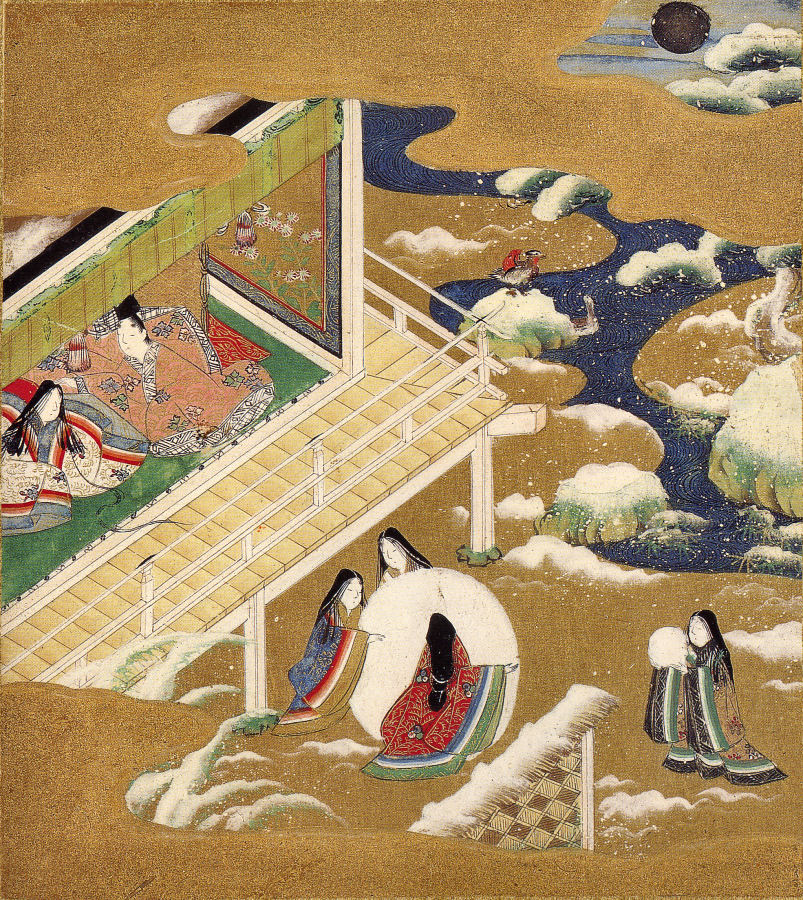
A Tosa Mitsuoki illustration of Heian court women in the winter, late 17th century

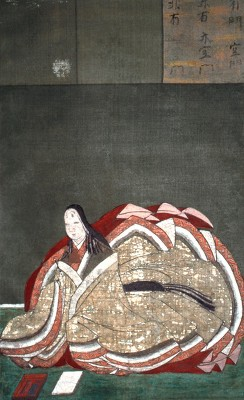
Late 16th-century (Azuchi–Momoyama period) depiction of Murasaki Shikibu, by Kanō Takanobu

Murasaki probably earned an ambiguous nickname, "The Lady of the Chronicles" (Nihongi no tsubone), for teaching Shōshi Chinese literature. A lady-in-waiting who disliked Murasaki accused her of flaunting her knowledge of Chinese and began calling her "The Lady of the Chronicles"—an allusion to the classic Chronicles of Japan—after an incident in which chapters from Genji were read aloud to the Emperor and his courtiers, one of whom remarked that the author showed a high level of education. Murasaki wrote in her diary, "How utterly ridiculous! Would I, who hesitate to reveal my learning to my women at home, ever think of doing so at court?" Although the nickname was apparently meant to be disparaging, Mulhern believes Murasaki was flattered by it.

The attitude toward the Chinese language was contradictory. In Teishi's court, the Chinese language had been flaunted and considered a symbol of imperial rule and superiority. Yet, in Shōshi's salon there was a great deal of hostility towards the language—perhaps owing to political expedience during a period when Chinese began to be rejected in favor of Japanese—even though Shōshi herself was a student of the language. The hostility may have affected Murasaki and her opinion of the court, and forced her to hide her knowledge of Chinese. Unlike Shōnagon, who was both ostentatious and flirtatious, as well as outspoken about her knowledge of Chinese, Murasaki seems to have been humble, an attitude which possibly impressed Michinaga. Although Murasaki used Chinese and incorporated it in her writing, she publicly rejected the language, a commendable attitude during a period of burgeoning Japanese culture.

Murasaki seems to have been unhappy with court life and was withdrawn and somber. No surviving records show that she entered poetry competitions; she appears to have exchanged few poems or letters with other women during her service. In general, unlike Shōnagon, Murasaki gives the impression in her diary that she disliked court life, the other ladies-in-waiting, and the drunken revelry. She did, however, become close friends with a lady-in-waiting named Lady Saishō, and she wrote of the winters that she enjoyed, "I love to see the snow here".

According to Waley, Murasaki may not have been unhappy with court life in general but bored in Shōshi's court. He speculates she would have preferred to serve with the Lady Senshi, whose household seems to have been less strict and more light-hearted. In her diary, Murasaki wrote about Shōshi's court, "[she] has gathered round her a number of very worthy young ladies ... Her Majesty is beginning to acquire more experience of life, and no longer judges others by the same rigid standards as before; but meanwhile her Court has gained a reputation for extreme dullness".

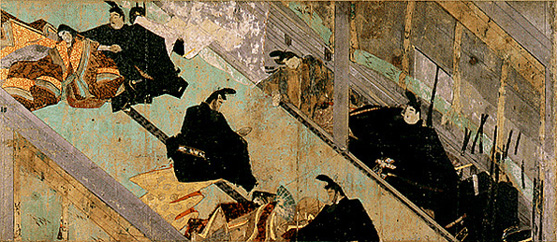
In this 13th century painting from the Murasaki Shikibu Diary Emaki, drunk, disarranged, and disordered Heian courtiers are shown joking and flirting with court ladies.

Murasaki disliked the men at court, whom she thought were drunken and stupid. However, some scholars, such as Waley, are certain she was involved romantically with Michinaga. At the least, Michinaga pursued her and pressured her strongly, and her flirtation with him is recorded in her diary as late as 1010. Yet, she wrote to him in a poem, "You have neither read my book, nor won my love." In her diary she records having to avoid advances from Michinaga—one night he sneaked into her room, stealing a newly written chapter of Genji. However, Michinaga's patronage was essential if she was to continue writing. Murasaki described her daughter's court activities: the lavish ceremonies, the complicated courtships, the "complexities of the marriage system", and in elaborate detail, the birth of Shōshi's two sons.

It is likely that Murasaki enjoyed writing in solitude. She believed she did not fit well with the general atmosphere of the court, writing of herself: "I am wrapped up in the study of ancient stories ... living all the time in a poetical world of my own scarcely realizing the existence of other people .... But when they get to know me, they find to their extreme surprise that I am kind and gentle". Inge says that she was too outspoken to make friends at court, and Mulhern thinks Murasaki's court life was comparatively quiet compared to other court poets. Mulhern speculates that her remarks about Izumi were not so much directed at Izumi's poetry but at her behavior, lack of morality and her court liaisons, of which Murasaki disapproved.

Rank was important in Heian court society and Murasaki would not have felt herself to have much, if anything, in common with the higher ranked and more powerful Fujiwaras. In her diary, she wrote of her life at court: "I realized that my branch of the family was a very humble one; but the thought seldom troubled me, and I was in those days far indeed from the painful consciousness of inferiority which makes life at Court a continual torment to me." A court position would have increased her social standing, but more importantly she gained a greater experience to write about. Court life, as she experienced it, is well reflected in the chapters of Genji written after she joined Shōshi. The name Murasaki was most probably given to her at a court dinner in an incident she recorded in her diary: in 1008 the well-known court poet Fujiwara no Kintō inquired after the "Young Murasaki"—an allusion to the character named Murasaki in Genji—which would have been considered a compliment from a male court poet to a female author.

== Later life and death ==
Genji-Garden at Rozan-ji, a temple in Kyoto associated with her former mansion

When Emperor Ichijō died in 1011, Shōshi retired from the Imperial Palace to live in a Fujiwara mansion in Biwa, most likely accompanied by Murasaki, who is recorded as being there with Shōshi in 1013. George Aston explains that when Murasaki retired from court she was again associated with Ishiyama-dera: "To this beautiful spot, it is said, Murasaki no Shikibu [sic] retired from court life to devote the remainder of her days to literature and religion. There are sceptics, however, Motoori being one, who refuse to believe this story, pointing out ... that it is irreconcilable with known facts. On the other hand, the very chamber in the temple where the Genji was written is shown—with the ink-slab which the author used, and a Buddhist Sutra in her handwriting, which, if they do not satisfy the critic, still are sufficient to carry conviction to the minds of ordinary visitors to the temple."

Murasaki may have died in 1014. Her father made a hasty return to Kyoto from his post at Echigo Province (modern Niigata) that year, possibly because of her death. Writing in A Bridge of Dreams: A Poetics of "The Tale of Genji", Shirane mentions that 1014 is generally accepted as the date of Murasaki Shikibu's death and 973 as the date of her birth, making her 41 when she died. Bowring considers 1014 to be speculative, and believes she may have lived with Shōshi until as late as 1025. Waley agrees given that Murasaki may have attended ceremonies with Shōshi held for Shōshi's son, Emperor Go-Ichijō around 1025.

Murasaki's brother Nobunori died in around 1011, which, combined with the death of his daughter, may have prompted her father to resign his post and take vows at Miidera temple where he died in 1029. Murasaki's daughter entered court service in 1025 as a wet nurse to the future Emperor Go-Reizei (1025–1068). She went on to become a well-known poet as Daini no Sanmi.

== Works ==
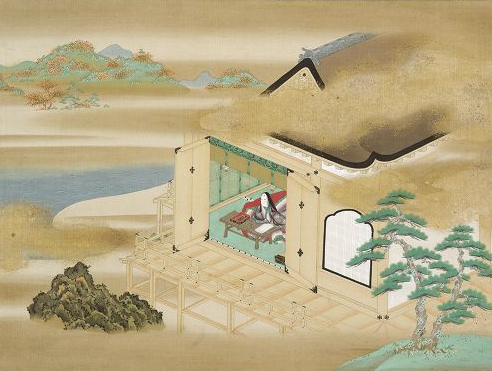
Murasaki is depicted writing at Ishiyama-dera in this late 17th century silk painting on the Harvard Genji Album frontispiece by Tosa Mitsuoki, housed at the Sackler Museum.

Three works are attributed to Murasaki: The Tale of Genji, The Diary of Lady Murasaki and Poetic Memoirs, a collection of 128 poems. Her work is considered important for its reflection of the creation and development of Japanese writing, during a period when Japanese shifted from an unwritten vernacular to a written language. Until the 9th century, Japanese language texts were written in Chinese characters using the man'yōgana writing system. A revolutionary achievement was the development of kana, a true Japanese script, in the mid-to late 9th century. Japanese authors began to write prose in their own language, which led to genres such as tales (monogatari) and poetic journals (Nikki Bungaku). Historian Edwin Reischauer writes that genres such as the monogatari were distinctly Japanese and that Genji, written in kana, "was the outstanding work of the period".

=== Diary and poetry ===
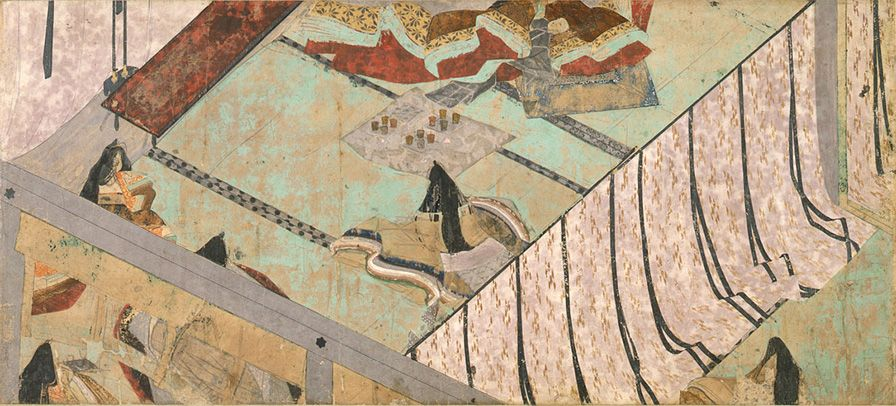
13th century illustration (emakimono) of The Diary of Lady Murasaki showing Empress Shōshi with the infant Emperor Go-Ichijō and ladies-in-waiting secluded behind a kichō.

Murasaki began her diary after she entered service at Shōshi's court. Much of what is known about her and her experiences at court comes from the diary, which covers the period from about 1008 to 1010. The long descriptive passages, some of which may have originated as letters, cover her relationships with the other ladies-in-waiting, Michinaga's temperament, the birth of Shōshi's sons—at Michinaga's mansion rather than at the Imperial Palace—and the process of writing Genji, including descriptions of passing newly written chapters to calligraphers for transcriptions. Typical of contemporary court diaries written to honor patrons, Murasaki devotes half to the birth of Shōshi's son Emperor Go-Ichijō, an event of enormous importance to Michinaga: he had planned for it with his daughter's marriage which made him grandfather and de facto regent to an emperor.

Poetic Memoirs is a collection of 128 poems Mulhern describes as "arranged in a biographical sequence". The original set has been lost. According to custom, the verses would have been passed from person to person and often copied. Some appear written for a lover—possibly her husband before he died—but she may have merely followed tradition and written simple love poems. They contain biographical details: she mentions a sister who died, the visit to Echizen province with her father and that she wrote poetry for Shōshi. Murasaki's poems were published in 1206 by Fujiwara no Teika, in what Mulhern believes to be the collection that is closest to the original form; at around the same time Teika included a selection of Murasaki's works in an imperial anthology, New Collections of Ancient and Modern Times.

=== The Tale of Genji ===
Murasaki is best known for her The Tale of Genji, a three-part novel spanning 1100 pages and 54 chapters, which is thought to have taken a decade to complete. The earliest chapters were possibly written for a private patron either during her marriage or shortly after her husband's death. She continued writing while at court and probably finished while still in service to Shōshi. She would have needed patronage to produce a work of such length. Michinaga provided her with costly paper and ink, and with calligraphers. The first handwritten volumes were probably assembled and bound by ladies-in-waiting.

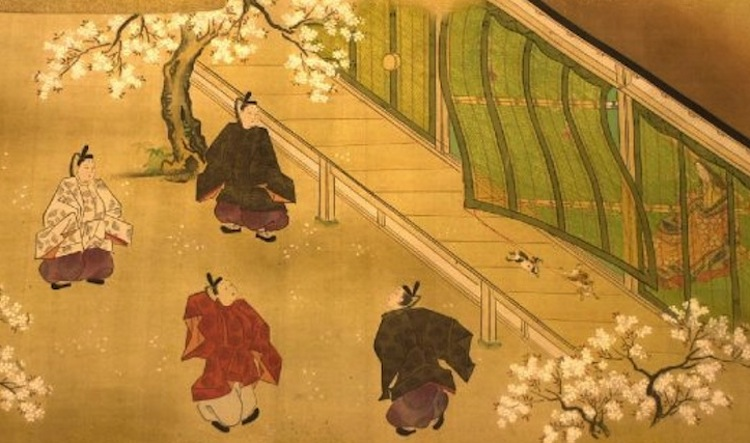
Late 17th century or early 18th century silk scroll painting of a scene from chapter 34 of The Tale of Genji showing men playing in the garden watched by a woman sitting behind a screen.

In his The Pleasures of Japanese Literature, Keene claims Murasaki wrote the "supreme work of Japanese fiction" by drawing on traditions of waka court diaries, and earlier monogatari—written in a mixture of Chinese script and Japanese script—such as The Tale of the Bamboo Cutter or The Tales of Ise. She drew on and blended styles from Chinese histories, narrative poetry and contemporary Japanese prose. Adolphson writes that the juxtaposition of formal Chinese style with mundane subjects resulted in a sense of parody or satire, giving her a distinctive voice. Genji follows the traditional format of monogatari—telling a tale—particularly evident in its use of a narrator, but Keene claims Murasaki developed the genre far beyond its bounds, and by doing so created a form that is utterly modern. The story of the "shining prince" Genji is set in the late 9th to early 10th centuries, and Murasaki eliminated from it the elements of fairy tales and fantasy frequently found in earlier monogatari.

The themes in Genji are common to the period, and are defined by Shively as encapsulating "the tyranny of time and the inescapable sorrow of romantic love". The main theme is that of the fragility of life, "the sorrow of human existence" (mono no aware), a term used over a thousand times in Genji. Keene speculates that in her tale of the "shining prince", Murasaki may have created for herself an idealistic escape from court life, which she found less than savory. In Prince Genji she formed a gifted, comely, refined, yet human and sympathetic protagonist. Keene writes that Genji gives a view into the Heian period; for example love affairs flourished, although women typically remained unseen behind screens, curtains or fusuma.

Helen McCullough describes Murasaki's writing as of universal appeal and believes The Tale of Genji "transcends both its genre and age. Its basic subject matter and setting—love at the Heian court—are those of the romance, and its cultural assumptions are those of the mid-Heian period, but Murasaki Shikibu's unique genius has made the work for many a powerful statement of human relationships, the impossibility of permanent happiness in love ... and the vital importance, in a world of sorrows, of sensitivity to the feelings of others." Prince Genji recognizes in each of his lovers the inner beauty of the woman and the fragility of life, which according to Keene, makes him heroic. The story was popular: Emperor Ichijō had it read to him, even though it was written in Japanese. By 1021 all the chapters were known to be complete and the work was sought after in the provinces where it was scarce.

== Legacy ==
Murasaki's reputation and influence have not diminished since her lifetime when she, with other Heian women writers, was instrumental in developing Japanese into a written language. Her writing was required reading for court poets as early as the 12th century as her work began to be studied by scholars who generated authoritative versions and criticism. Within a century of her death she was highly regarded as a classical writer. In the 17th century, Murasaki's work became emblematic of Confucian philosophy and women were encouraged to read her books. In 1673, Kumazawa Banzan argued that her writing was valuable for its sensitivity and depiction of emotions. He wrote in his Discursive Commentary on Genji that when "human feelings are not understood the harmony of the Five Human Relationships is lost."

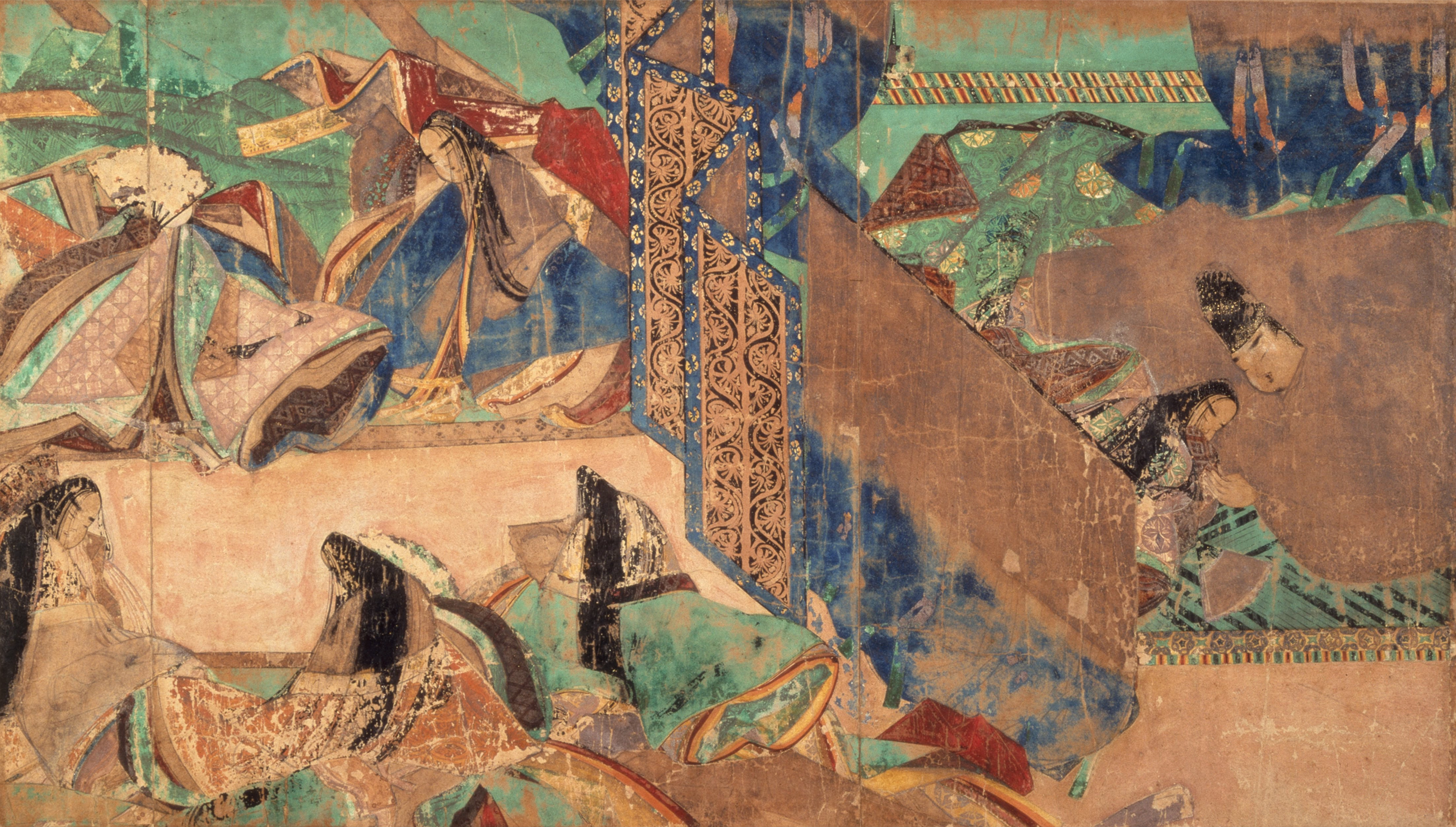
Early 12th century handscroll scene from Genji, showing lovers separated from ladies-in-waiting by two screens, a kichō and a byōbu.

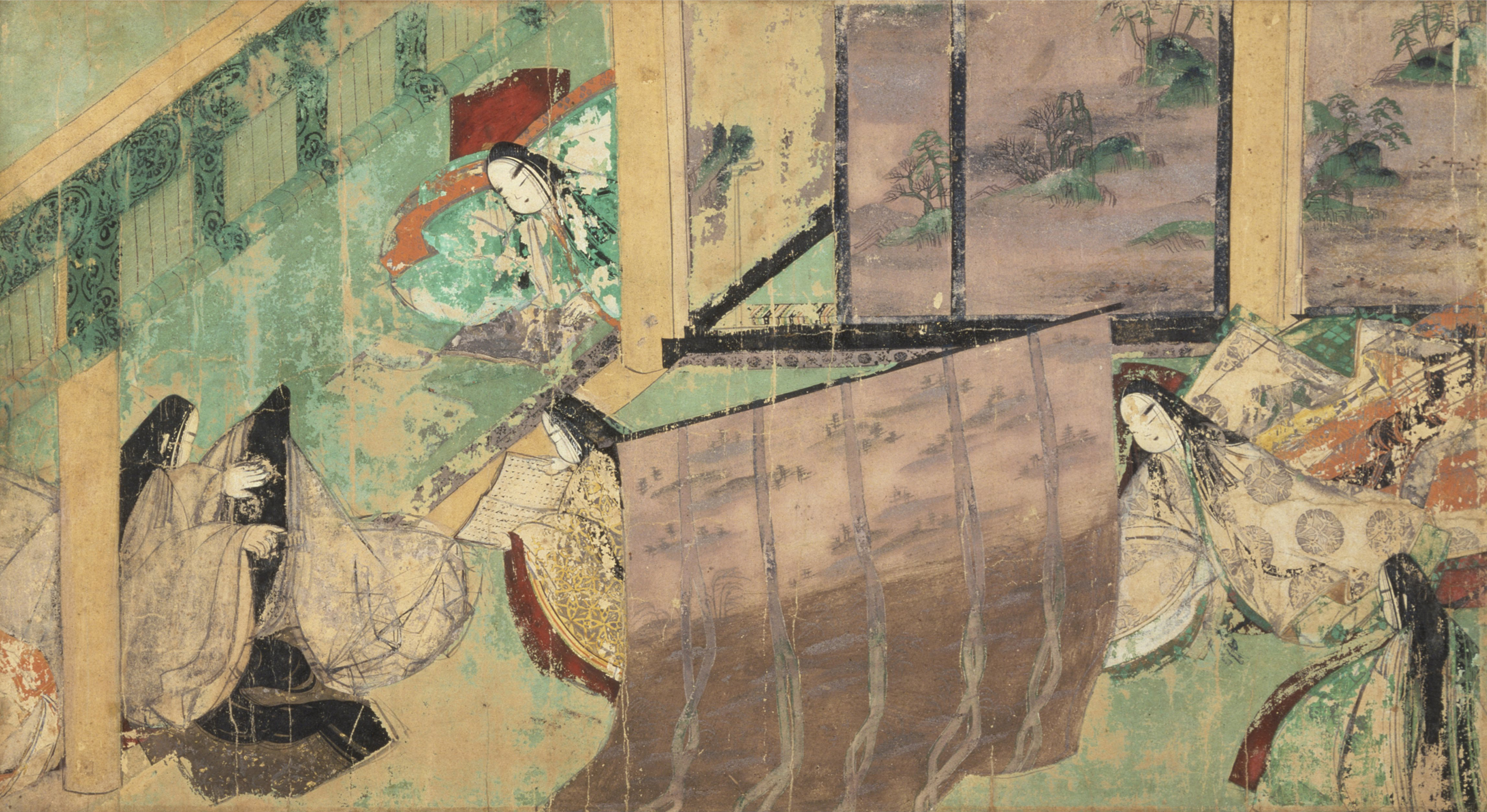
Early 12th century painting showing a scene from Genji of women in a traditional room partitioned by fusuma, shōji and a kichō. This work is listed as National Treasure of Japan.

The Tale of Genji was copied and illustrated in various forms as early as a century after Murasaki's death. The Genji Monogatari Emaki, is a late Heian era 12th century handscroll, consisting of four scrolls, 19 paintings, and 20 sheets of calligraphy. The illustrations, definitively dated to between 1110 and 1120, have been tentatively attributed to Fujiwara no Takachika and the calligraphy to various well-known contemporary calligraphers. The scroll is housed at the Gotoh Museum and the Tokugawa Art Museum.

Female virtue was tied to literary knowledge in the 17th century, leading to a demand for Murasaki or Genji inspired artifacts, known as genji-e. Dowry sets decorated with scenes from Genji or illustrations of Murasaki became particularly popular for noblewomen: in the 17th century genji-e symbolically imbued a bride with an increased level of cultural status; by the 18th century they had come to symbolize marital success. In 1628, Tokugawa Iemitsu's daughter had a set of lacquer boxes made for her wedding; Prince Toshitada received a pair of silk genji-e screens, painted by Kanō Tan'yū as a wedding gift in 1649.

Murasaki became a popular subject of paintings and illustrations highlighting her as a virtuous woman and poet. She is often shown at her desk in Ishiyama Temple, staring at the Moon for inspiration. Tosa Mitsuoki made her the subject of hanging scrolls in the 17th century. The Tale of Genji became a favorite subject of Japanese ukiyo-e artists for centuries with artists such as Hiroshige, Kiyonaga, and Utamaro illustrating various editions of the novel. While early Genji art was considered symbolic of court culture, by the middle of the Edo period the mass-produced ukiyo-e prints made the illustrations accessible for the samurai classes and commoners.

In Envisioning the "Tale of Genji" Shirane observes that "The Tale of Genji has become many things to many different audiences through many different media over a thousand years ... unmatched by any other Japanese text or artifact." The work and its author were popularized through its illustrations in various media: emaki (illustrated handscrolls); byōbu-e (screen paintings), ukiyo-e (woodblock prints); films, comics, and in the modern period, manga. In her fictionalized account of Murasaki's life, The Tale of Murasaki: A Novel, Liza Dalby has Murasaki involved in a romance during her travels with her father to Echizen Province.

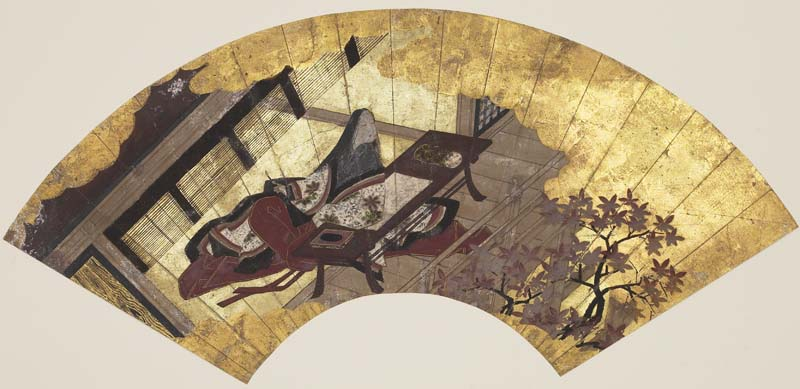
17th century ink and gold paper fan showing Murasaki's writing

The Tale of the Genji is recognized as an enduring classic. McCullough writes that Murasaki "is both the quintessential representative of a unique society and a writer who speaks to universal human concerns with a timeless voice. Japan has not seen another such genius." Keene writes that The Tale of Genji continues to captivate, because, in the story, her characters and their concerns are universal. When Waley's translation (The Tale of Genji: A Novel in Six Parts) was published in 1933, reviewers compared Genji to Austen, Proust, and Shakespeare. Mulhern says of Murasaki that she is similar to Shakespeare, who represented his Elizabethan England, in that she captured the essence of the Heian court and as a novelist "succeeded perhaps even beyond her own expectations." Like Shakespeare, her work has been the subject of reams of criticism and many books.

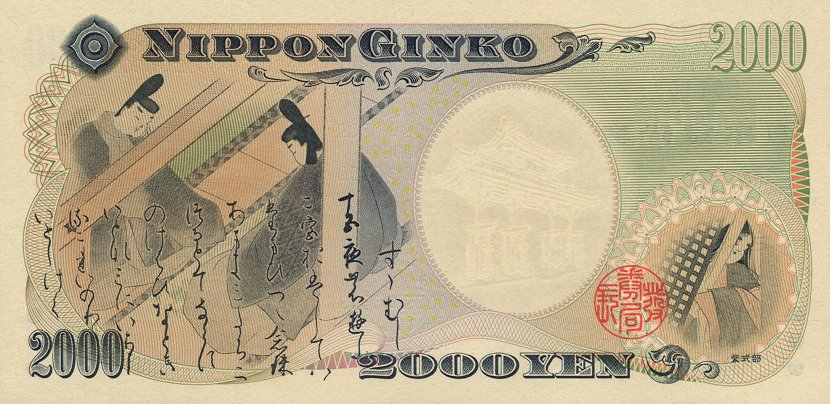
The design of the 2000-yen note was created in Murasaki's honour.

Kyoto held a year-long celebration commemorating the 1000th anniversary of Genji in 2008, with poetry competitions, visits to the Tale of Genji Museum in Uji and Ishiyama-dera (where a life size rendition of Murasaki at her desk was displayed), and women dressing in traditional 12-layer Heian court jūnihitoe and ankle-length wigs. The author and her work inspired museum exhibits and Genji manga spin-offs. The design on the reverse of the first 2000 yen note commemorated her and The Tale of Genji. A plant bearing purple berries has been named after her.

A Genji Album, only in the 1970s dated to 1510, is housed at Harvard University. The album is considered the earliest of its kind and consists of 54 paintings by Tosa Mitsunobu and 54 sheets of calligraphy on shikishi paper in five colors, written by master calligraphers. The leaves are housed in a case dated to the Edo period, with a silk frontispiece painted by Tosa Mitsuoki, dated to around 1690. The album contains Mitsuoki's authentication slips for his ancestor's 16th century paintings.

=== Gallery ===
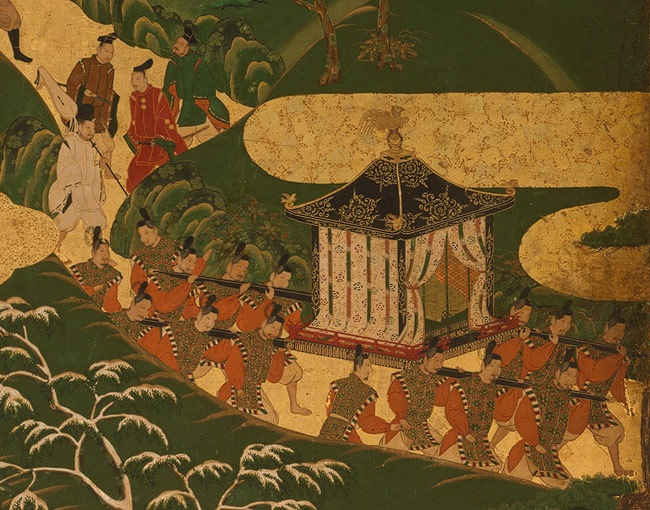
In The Tale of Genji, Murasaki described court life, as depicted in this exterior scene titled "Royal Outing", late 16th century by Tosa Mitsuyoshi.

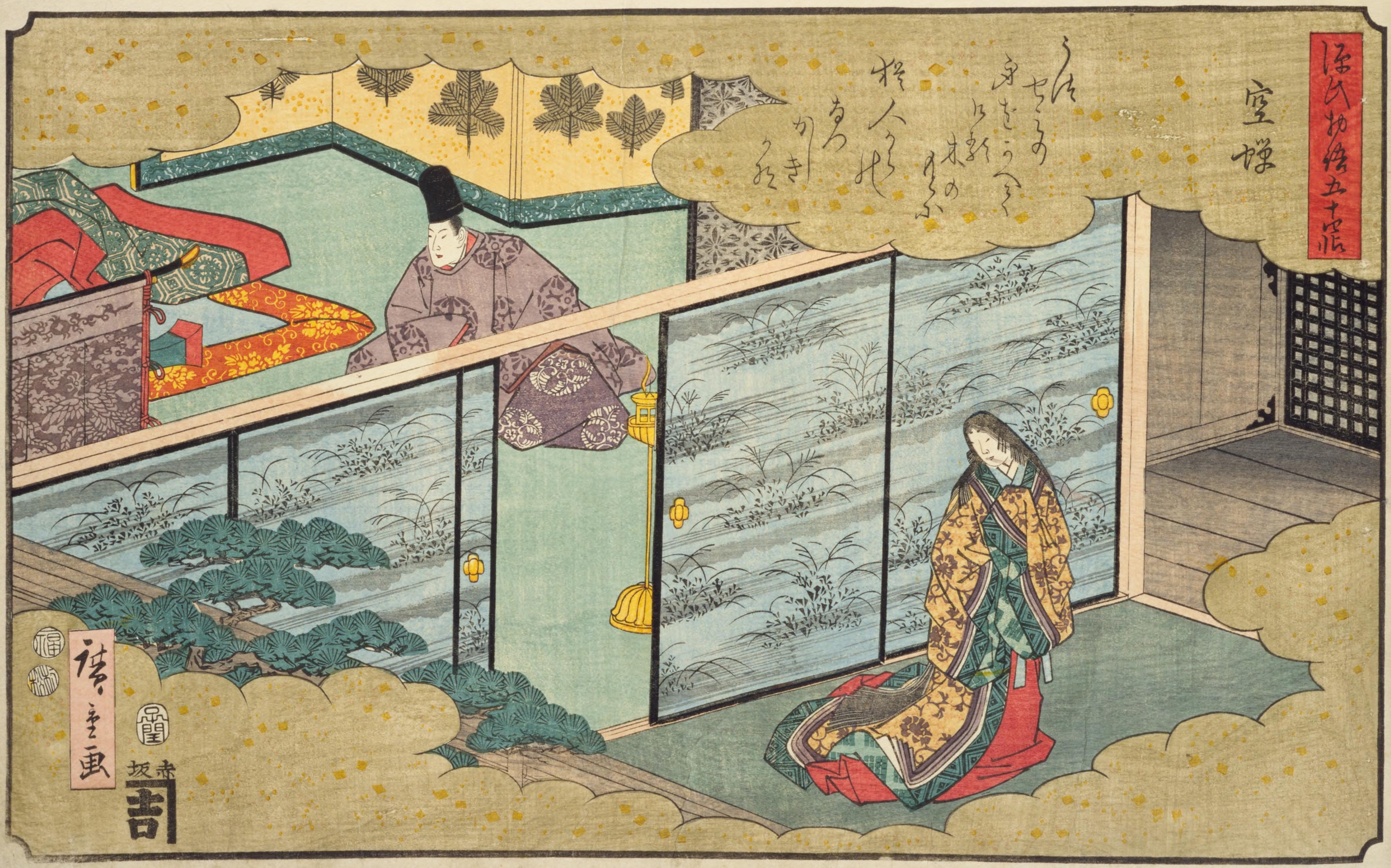
Hiroshige ukiyo-e print (1852) shows an interior court scene from The Tale of Genji.

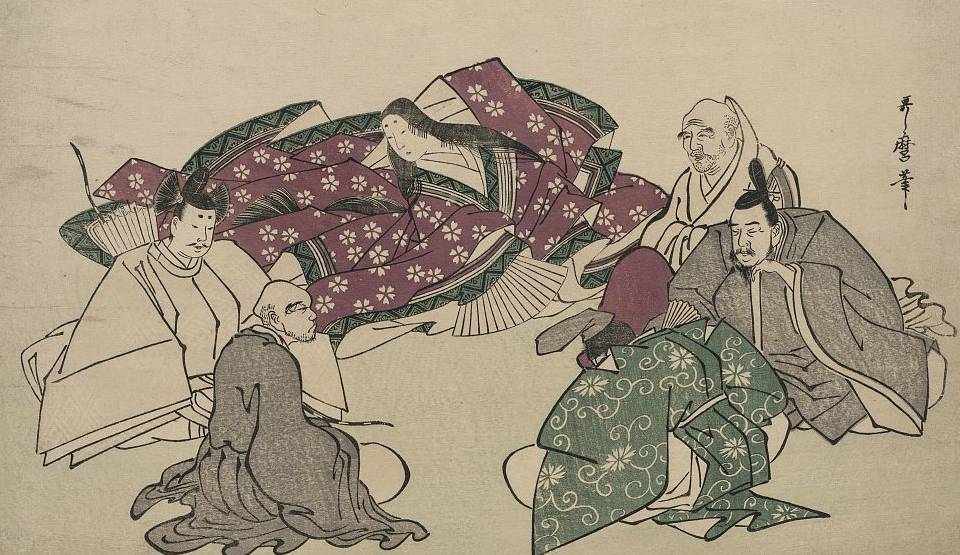
In this 1795 woodcut, Murasaki is shown in discussion with five male court poets.

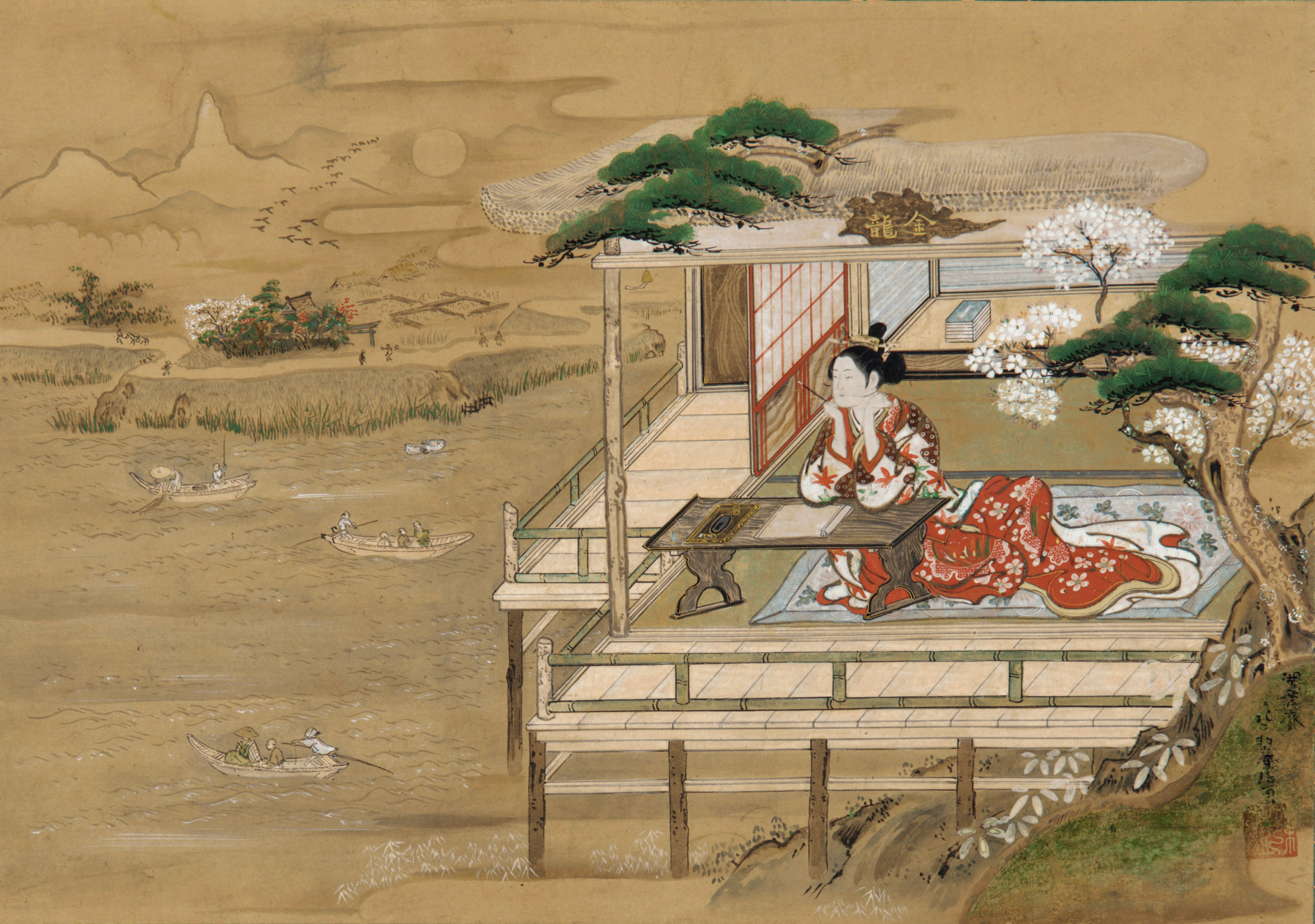
Murasaki Shikibu composing The Tale of Genji, by Yashima Gakutei (1786–1868).

== Sources ==
- Adolphson, Mikhael; Kamens, Edward and Matsumoto, Stacie. Heian Japan: Centers and Peripheries. (2007). Honolulu: Hawaii UP. ISBN 978-0-8248-3013-7
- Aston, William. A History of Japanese Literature. (1899). London: Heinemann.
- Bowring, Richard John (ed). "Introduction". in The Diary of Lady Murasaki. (1996). London: Penguin. ISBN 978-0-14-043576-4
- Bowring, Richard John (ed). "The Cultural Background". in The Tale of Genji. (2004). Cambridge: Cambridge UP. ISBN 978-0-521-83208-3
- Frédéric, Louis. Japan Encyclopedia. (2005). Cambridge, MA: Harvard UP. ISBN 978-0-674-01753-5
- Geczy, Adam. Art: Histories, Theories and Exceptions. (2008). London: Oxford International Publishers. ISBN 978-1-84520-700-7
- Inge, Thomas. "Lady Murasaki and the Craft of Fiction". (May 1990) Atlantic Review. (55). 7–14.
- Henshall, Kenneth G. A History of Japan. (1999). New York: St. Martin's. ISBN 978-0-312-21986-4
- Kodansha Encyclopedia of Japan. (1983) New York: Kōdansha. ISBN 978-0-87011-620-9
- Keene, Donald. Seeds in the Heart: Japanese Literature from Earliest times to the Late Sixteenth Century. (1999). New York: Columbia UP. ISBN 978-0-231-11441-7
- Keene, Donald. The Pleasures of Japanese Literature. (1988). New York: Columbia UP. ISBN 978-0-231-06736-2
- The Japan Book: A Comprehensive Pocket Guide. (2004). New York: Kodansha International. ISBN 978-4-7700-2847-1
- Lillehoj, Elizabeth. Critical Perspectives on Classicism in Japanese Painting, 1600–17. (2004). Honolulu: Hawaii UP. ISBN 978-0-8248-2699-4
- Lockard, Craig. Societies, Networks, and Transitions, Volume I: To 1500: A Global History. (2008). Boston: Wadsworth. ISBN 978-1-4390-8535-6
- Mason, R.H.P. and Caiger, John Godwin. A History of Japan. (1997). North Clarendon, VT: Tuttle Publishing. ISBN 978-0-8048-2097-4
- McCormick, Melissa. "Genji Goes West: The 1510 Genji Album and the Visualization of Court and Capital". (March 2003). Art Bulletin. (85). 54–85
- McCullough, Helen. Classical Japanese Prose: An Anthology. (1990). Stanford CA: Stanford UP. ISBN 978-0-8047-1960-5
- Mostow, Joshua. "Mother Tongue and Father Script: The relationship of Sei Shonagon and Murasaki Shikibu". in Copeland, Rebecca L. and Ramirez-Christensen Esperanza (eds). The Father-Daughter Plot: Japanese Literary Women and the Law of the Father. (2001). Honolulu: Hawaii UP. ISBN 978-0-8248-2438-9
- Mulhern, Chieko Irie. Heroic with Grace: Legendary Women of Japan. (1991). Armonk NY: M.E. Sharpe. ISBN 978-0-87332-527-1
- Mulhern, Chieko Irie. Japanese Women Writers: a Bio-critical Sourcebook. (1994). Westport CT: Greenwood Press. ISBN 978-0-313-25486-4
- Perez, Louis G. The History of Japan. (1990). Westport CT: Greenwood Press. ISBN 978-0-313-30296-1
- Puette, William J. The Tale of Genji: A Reader's Guide. (1983). North Clarendon VT: Tuttle Publishing. ISBN 978-0-8048-3331-8
- Reschauer, Edwin. Japan: The Story of a Nation. (1999). New York: McGraw-Hill. ISBN 978-0-07-557074-5
- Shirane, Haruo. The Bridge of Dreams: A Poetics of "The Tale of Genji". (1987). Stanford CA: Stanford UP. ISBN 978-0-8047-1719-9
- Shirane, Haruo. Envisioning the Tale of Genji: Media, Gender, and Cultural Production. (2008a). New York: Columbia UP. ISBN 978-0-231-14237-3
- Shirane, Haruo. Traditional Japanese Literature: An Anthology, Beginnings to 1600. (2008b). New York: Columbia UP. ISBN 978-0-231-13697-6
- Shively, Donald and McCullough, William H. The Cambridge History of Japan: Heian Japan. (1999). Cambridge UP. ISBN 978-0-521-22353-9
- Tsunoda, Bunei. "Real name of Murasahiki Shikibu". Kodai Bunka (Cultura antiqua). (1963) (55). 1–27.
- Ueno, Chizuko. The Modern Family in Japan: Its Rise and Fall. (2009). Melbourne: Transpacific Press. ISBN 978-1-876843-56-4
- Waley, Arthur. "Introduction". in Shikibu, Murasaki, The Tale of Genji: A Novel in Six Parts. translated by Arthur Waley. (1960). New York: Modern Library.
