= Daini no Sanmi =

Japanese poet in the Heian period; daughter of Murasaki Shikibu

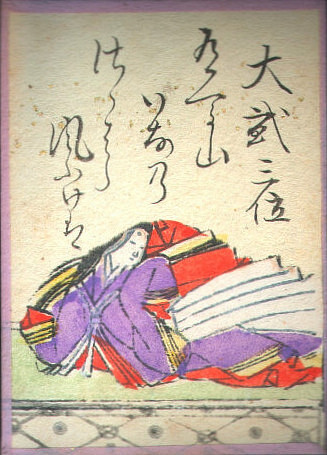
- Daini no Sanmi, from the Ogura Hyakunin Isshu
- Born: c. 999
- Occupation(s): Lady-in-waiting to Empress Shōshi, poet, wet nurse to Emperor Go-Reizei
- Spouse: Takashina no Nariakira
- Children: Son by spouse, and daughter with Fujiwara no Kanetaka (unknown identity)
- Parents: Fujiwara no Nobutaka (father); Murasaki Shikibu (mother)

Daini no Sanmi (大弐三位, dates unknown but born c. 999) was a Japanese waka poet of the mid-Heian period.

== Biography ==
She was the daughter of Murasaki Shikibu and Fujiwara no Nobutaka. Her given name was Katako (賢子), although the kanji can also be read as Kenshi.

In 1017, she joined to the court and served as a lady-in-waiting for Grand Empress Dowager Shoshi, the mother of Emperor Go-Ichijo. She was married to Takashina no Nariakira and produced a son in 1038, and she had a daughter with Fujiwara no Kanetaka in 1026. She also served as the nurse of Imperial Princess Teishi and Emperor Go-Reizei. When Emperor Go-Reizei ascended the throne, she was promoted.

== Poetry ==
Thirty-seven or thirty-eight of her poems were included in imperial anthologies from the Goshūi Wakashū onward.

One of her poems was included as the fifty-eighth in the Ogura Hyakunin Isshu:

有馬山猪名の笹原風吹けば
いでそよ人を忘れやはする
Arima-yama ina no sasahara kaze fukeba
ide soyo hito o wasure ya wa suru
At the foot of Mt. Arima the wind rustles through bamboo grasses wavering yet constant—there will never be a moment that I forget about you.
(Goshūi Wakashū 12:709)

She also produced a private collection called the Daini no Sanmi-shū (大弐三位集).

== Possible partial authorship of The Tale of Genji ==
Some scholars have attributed the final ten chapters of her mother's magnum opus, The Tale of Genji, to her.

== Bibliography ==
- Keene, Donald (1999) [paperback edition originally published in 1993]. A History of Japanese Literature, Vol. 1: Seeds in the Heart — Japanese Literature from Earliest Times to the Late Sixteenth Century. New York: Columbia University Press. pp. 301, 478, 480. ISBN 978-0-231-11441-7.
- McMillan, Peter (2010) [first edition published in 2008]. One Hundred Poets, One Poem Each. New York: Columbia University Press.
- Suzuki, Hideo; Yamaguchi, Shin'ichi; Yoda, Yasushi (2009) [first edition published in 1997]. Genshoku: Ogura Hyakunin Isshu (in Japanese). Tokyo: Bun'eidō.
