= The Tale of Genji Museum =

Literary museum in Uji, Japan

Coordinates: 34°53′39″N 135°48′37″E

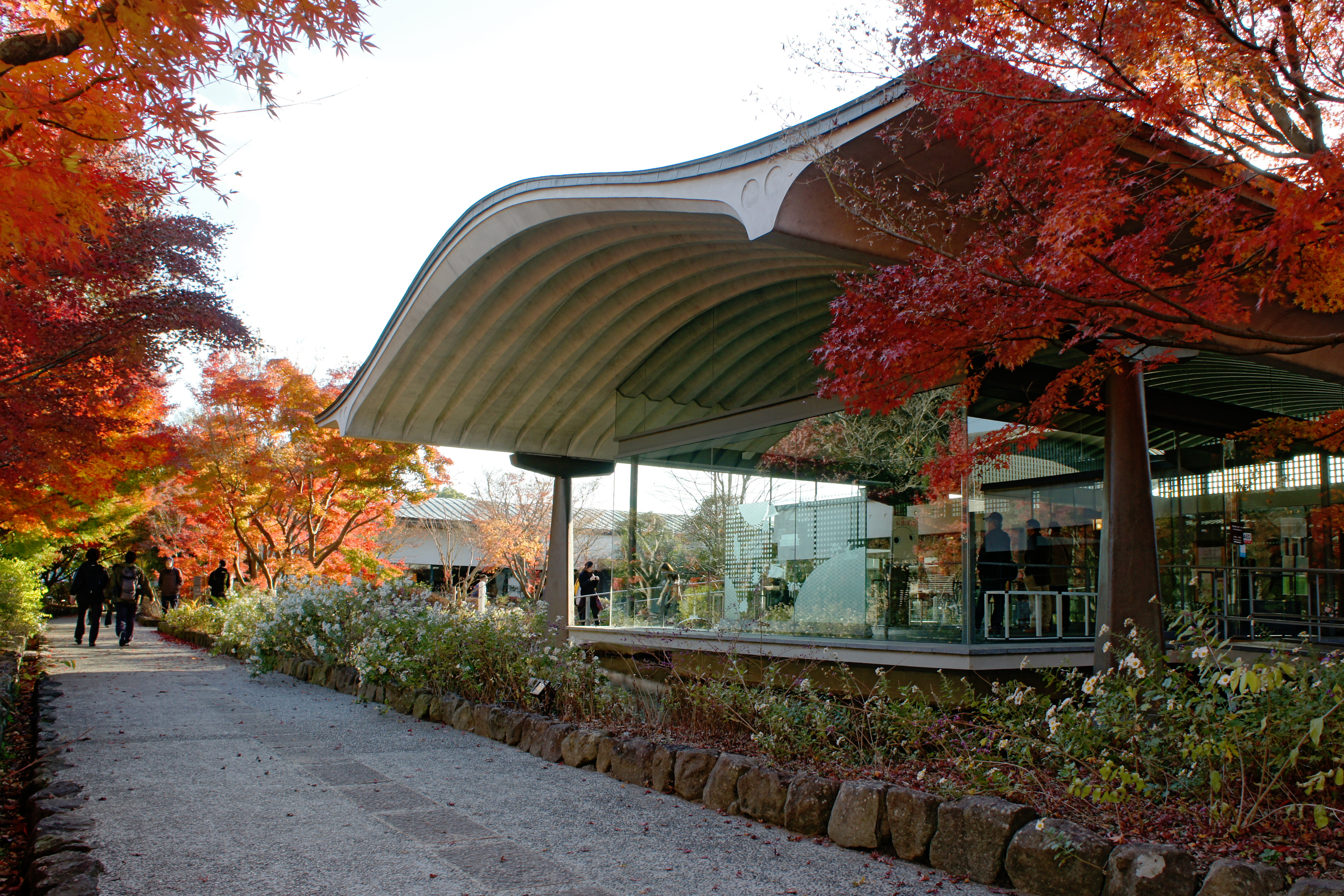
The Tale of Genji Museum

The Tale of Genji Museum is in Uji, Kyoto, Japan. It displays the world of the early 11th century Japanese classic novel The Tale of Genji with projected images, models, and exhibitions. The culture of the Imperial Court of the Heian period, the aristocrats' costumes, and the furnishings of their residences are shown.

The last ten chapters of The Tale of Genji are set in Uji; the hero is Kaoru Genji (a son of Hikaru Genji). The story of these chapters is reproduced with great realism using a scrim and life-size set. Visitors are introduced to the story line and main characters. A short film based on the "Uji chapters" and created solely for the museum is presented in the movie room.

There is a library with a collection of books about The Tale of Genji.

The museum opened in 1998.

== Gallery ==
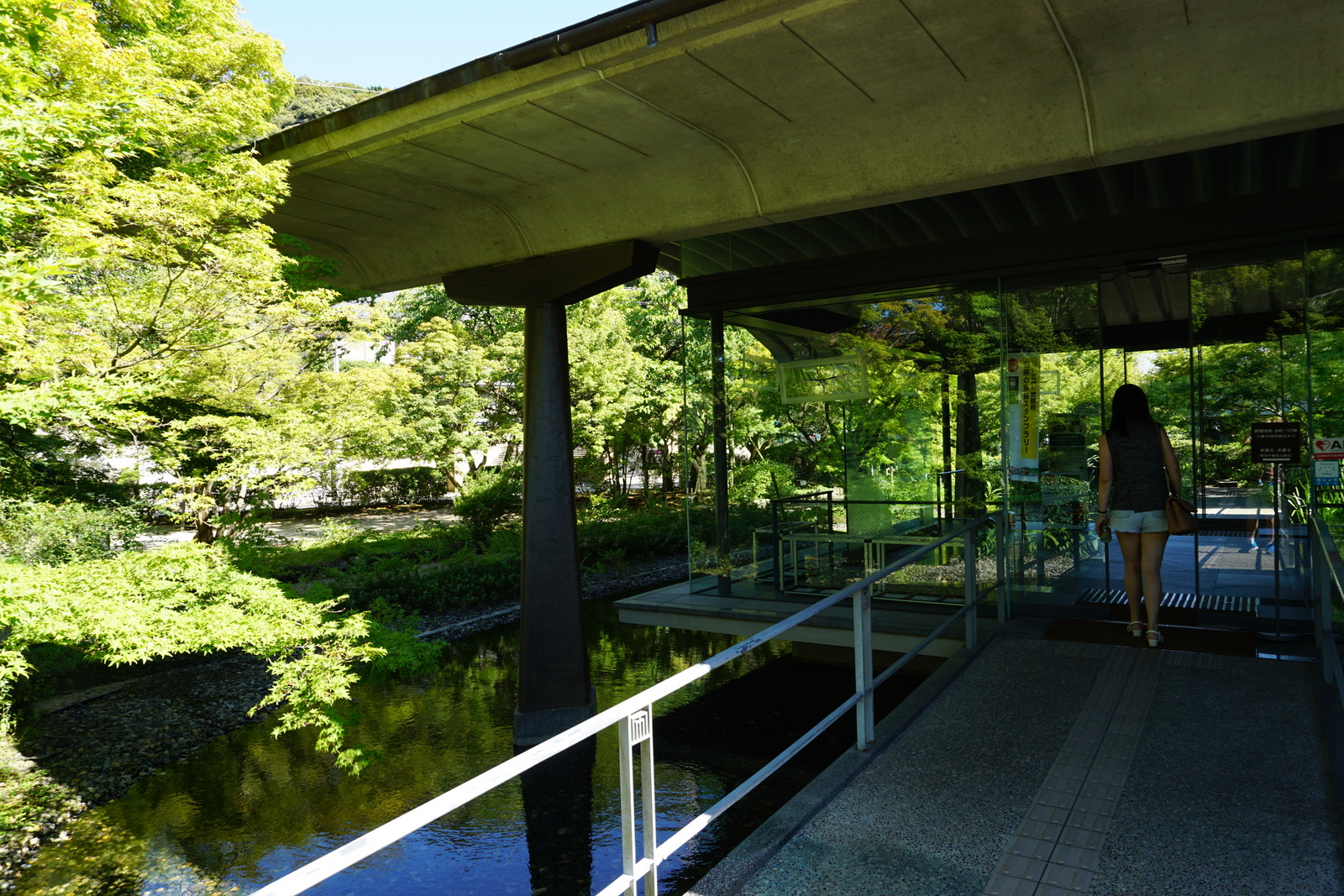
Entrance to Tale of Genji museum in Uji

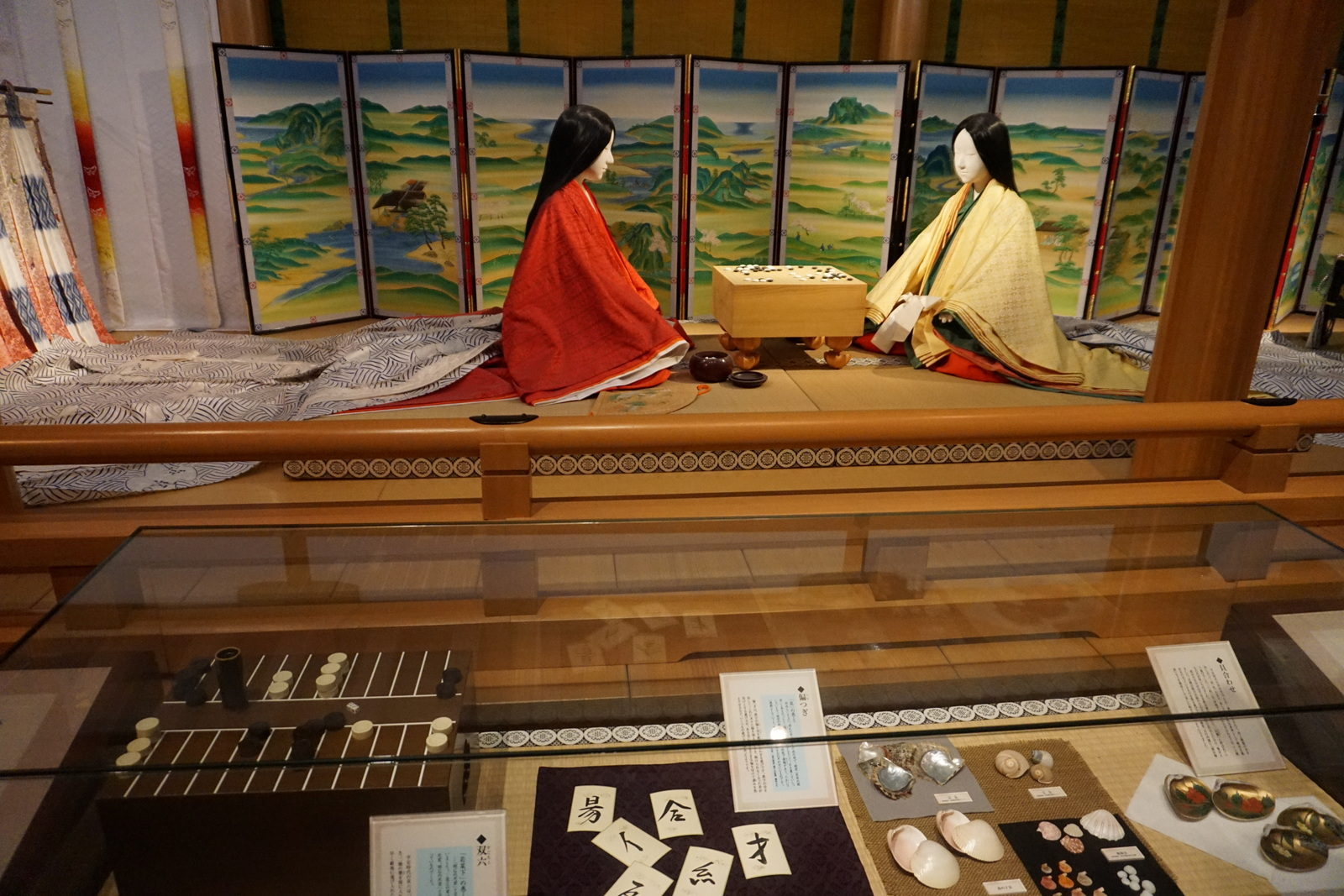
Court ladies in Tale of Genji museum showing a scene from the book

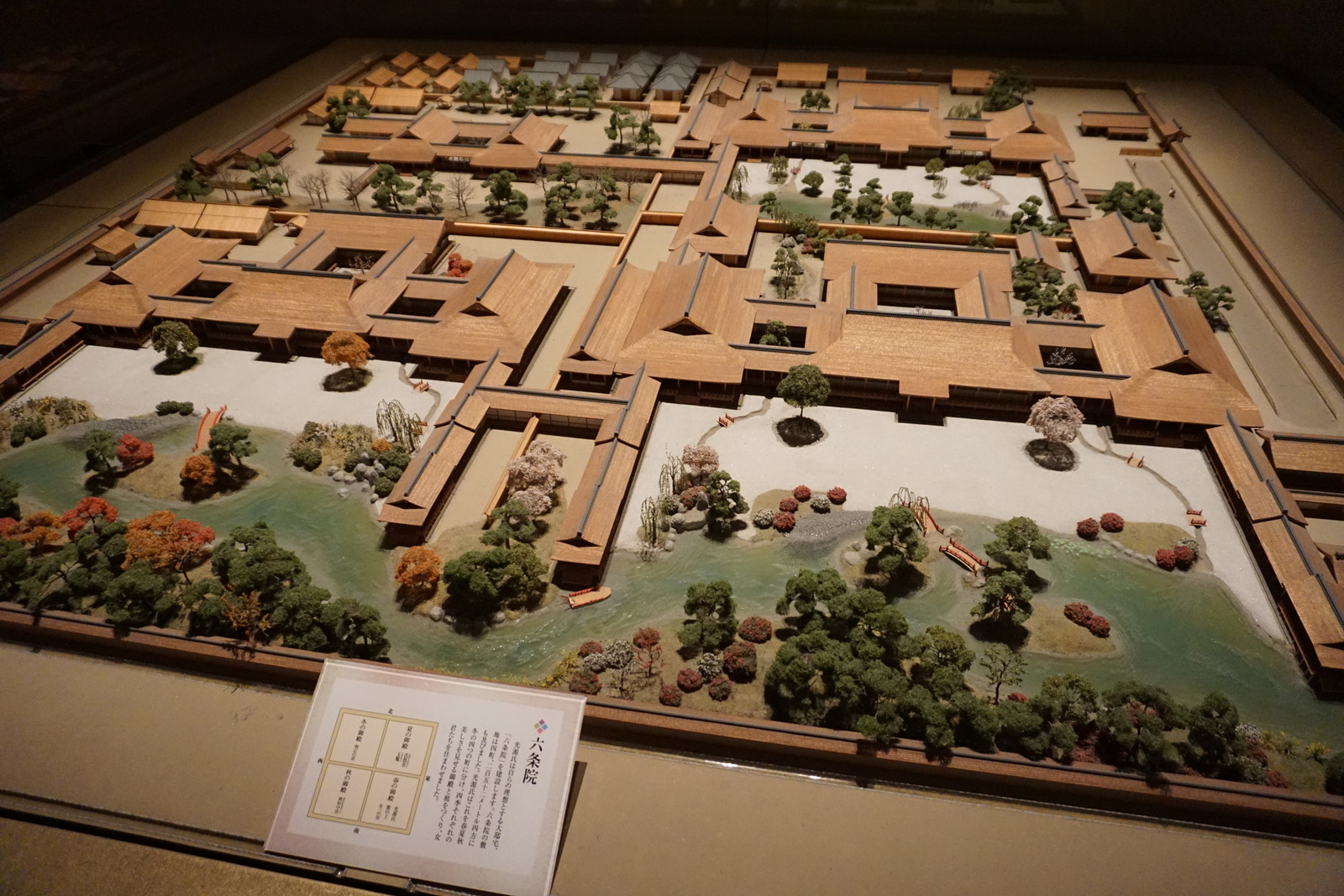
The "four-seasons" house in Tale of Genji museum

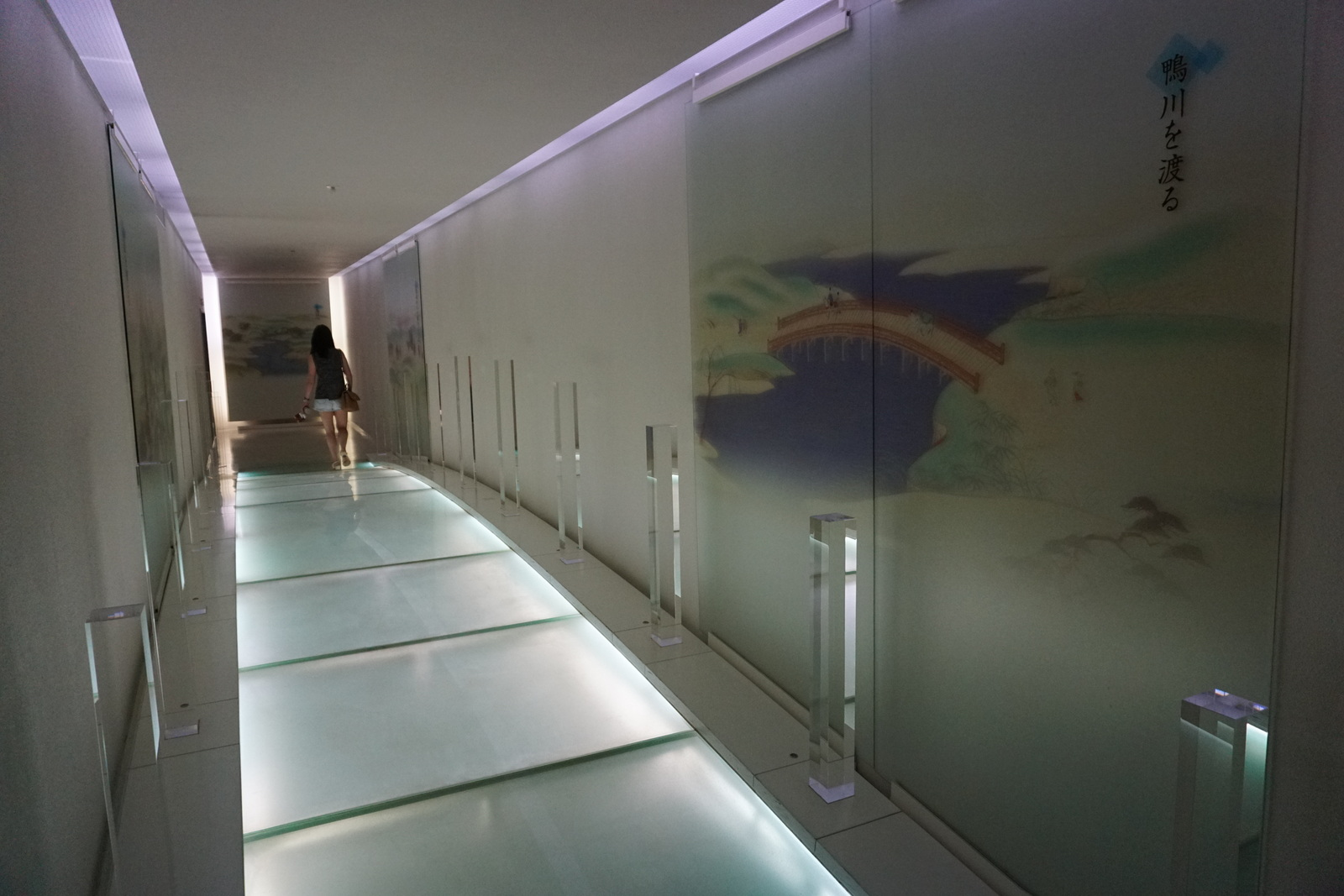
Glass bridge in Tale of Genji museum

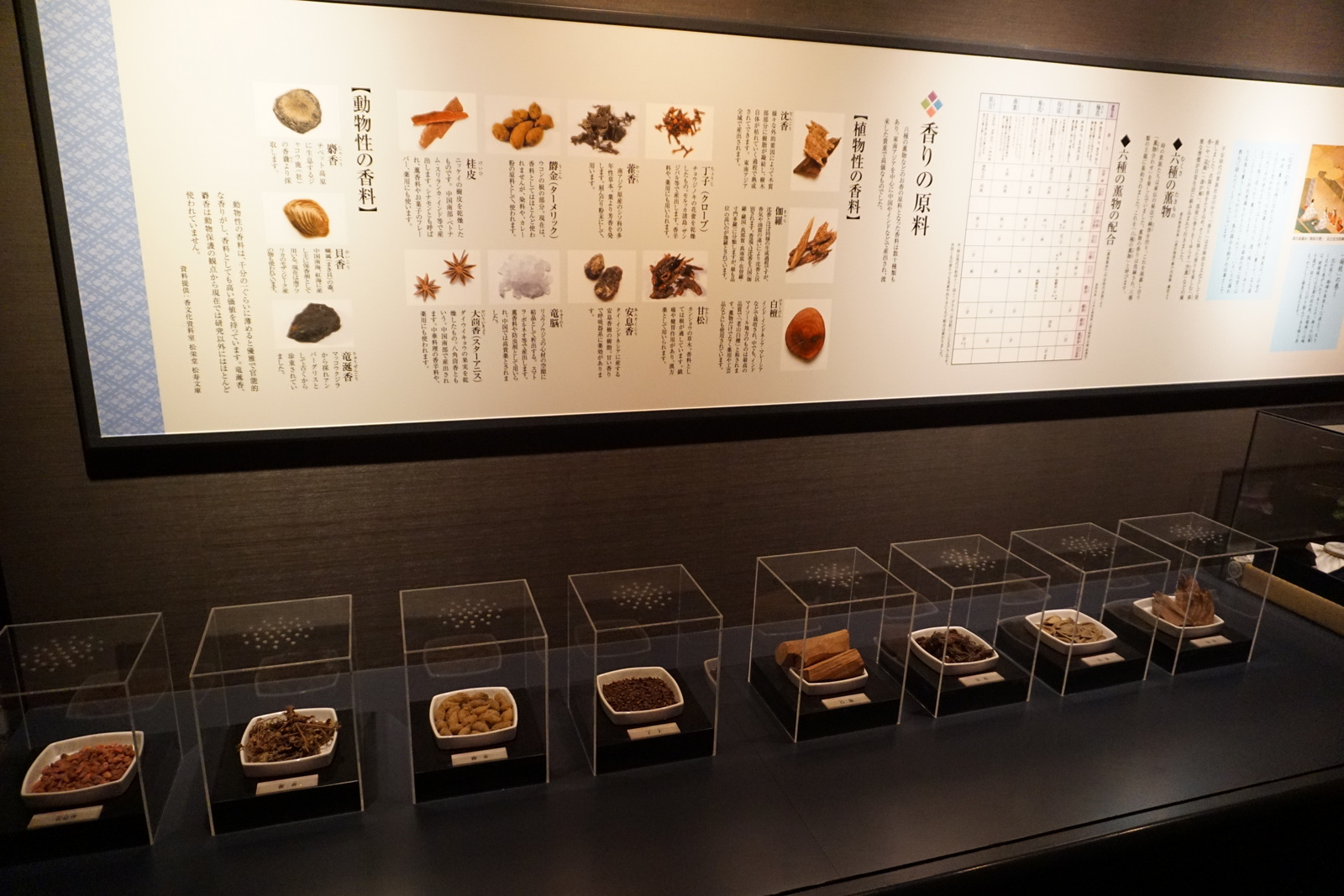
Exhibit of seasonings in Tale of Genji museum

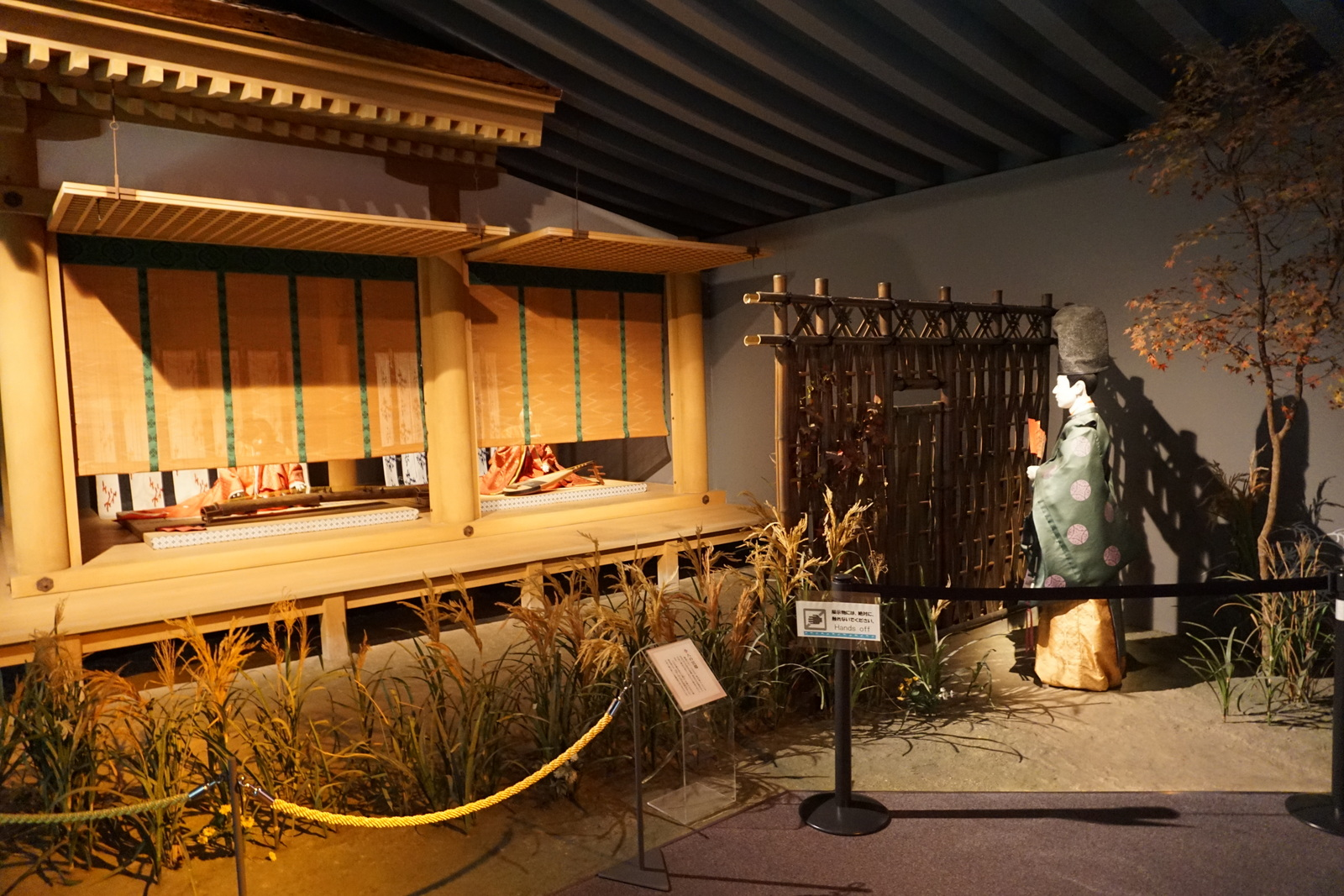
A scene from the book in the Tale of Genji museum

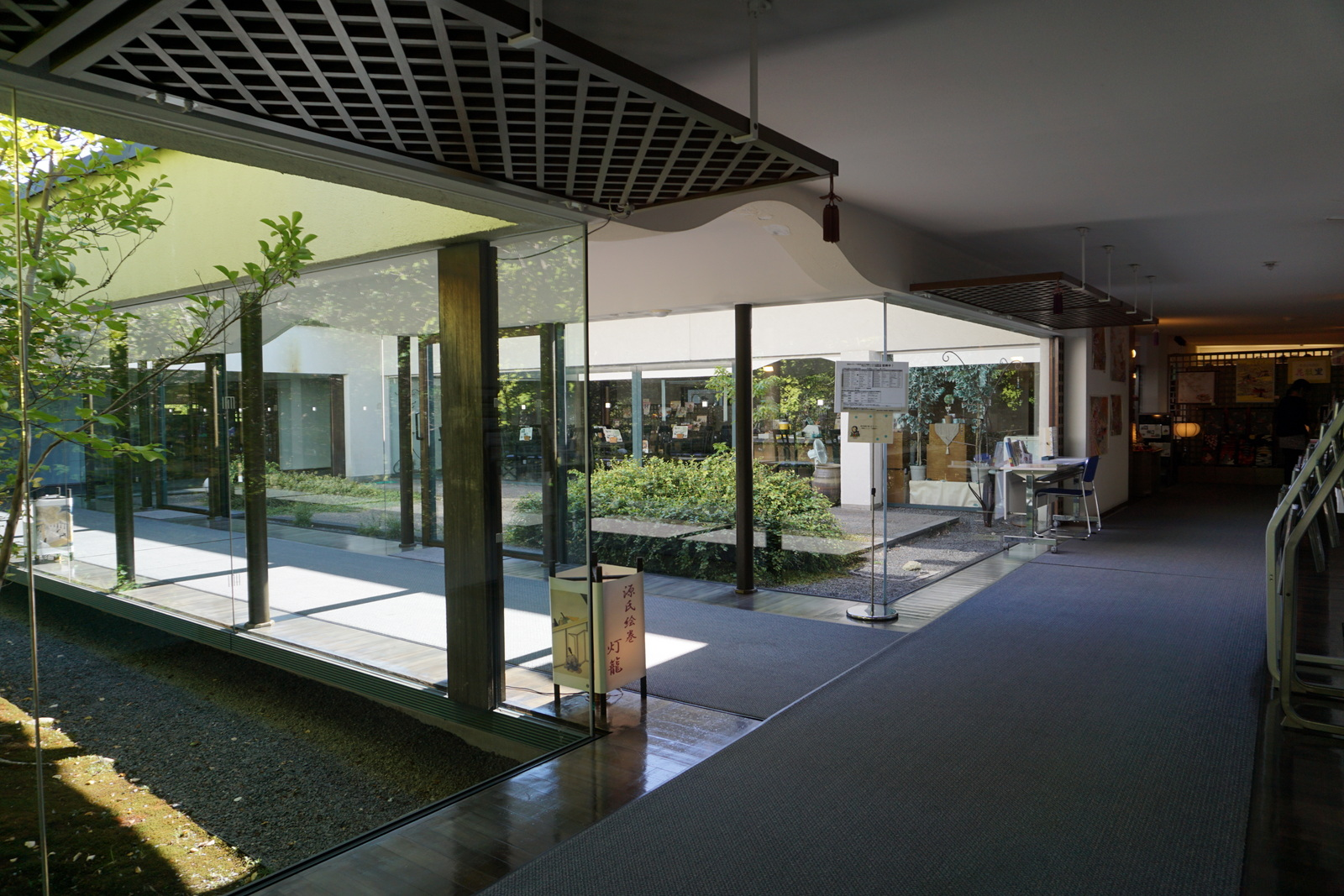
Interior of Tale of Genji museum in Uji, Kyoto

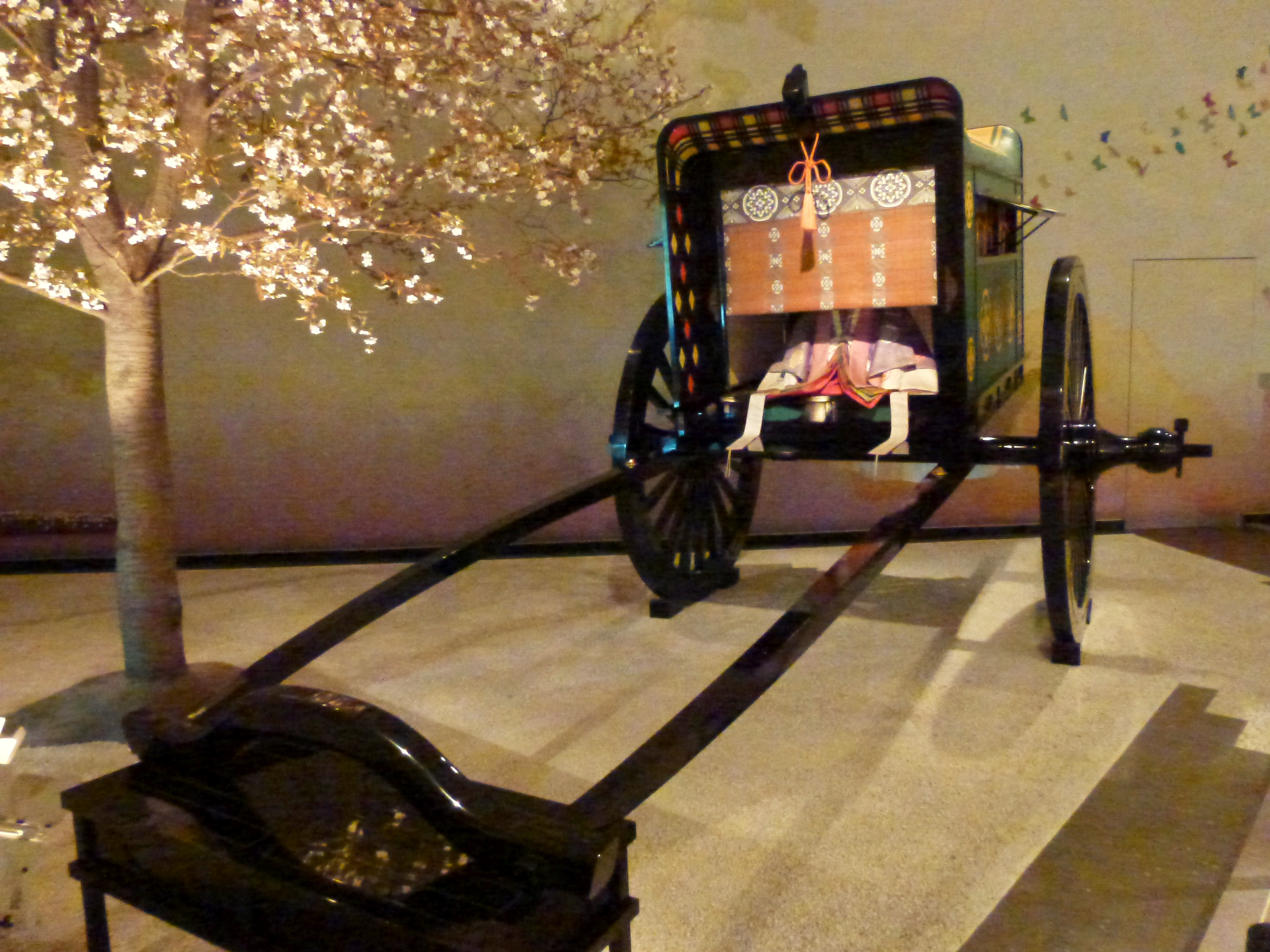
The oxen-drawn carriage

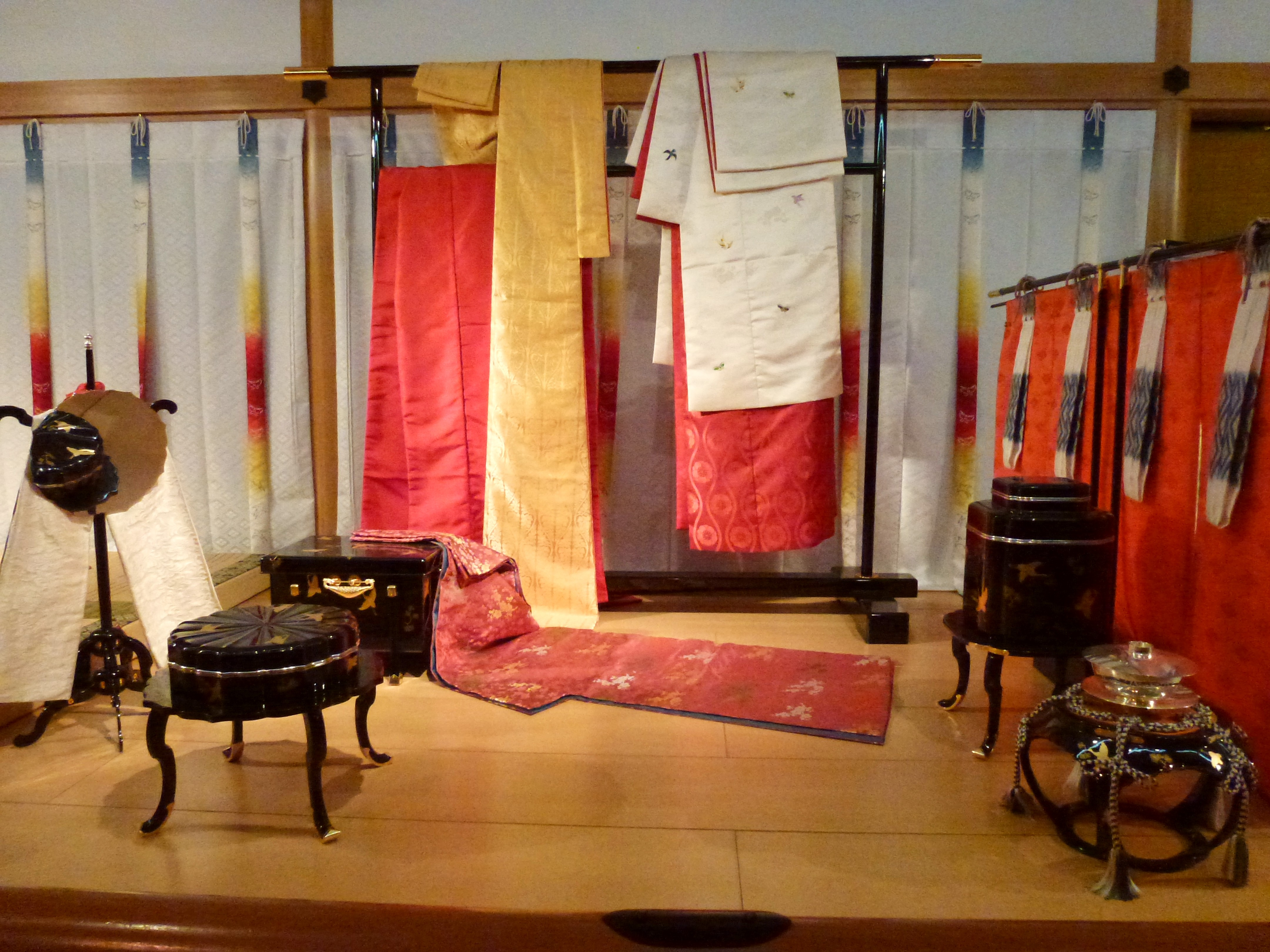
The attire and the furnishings

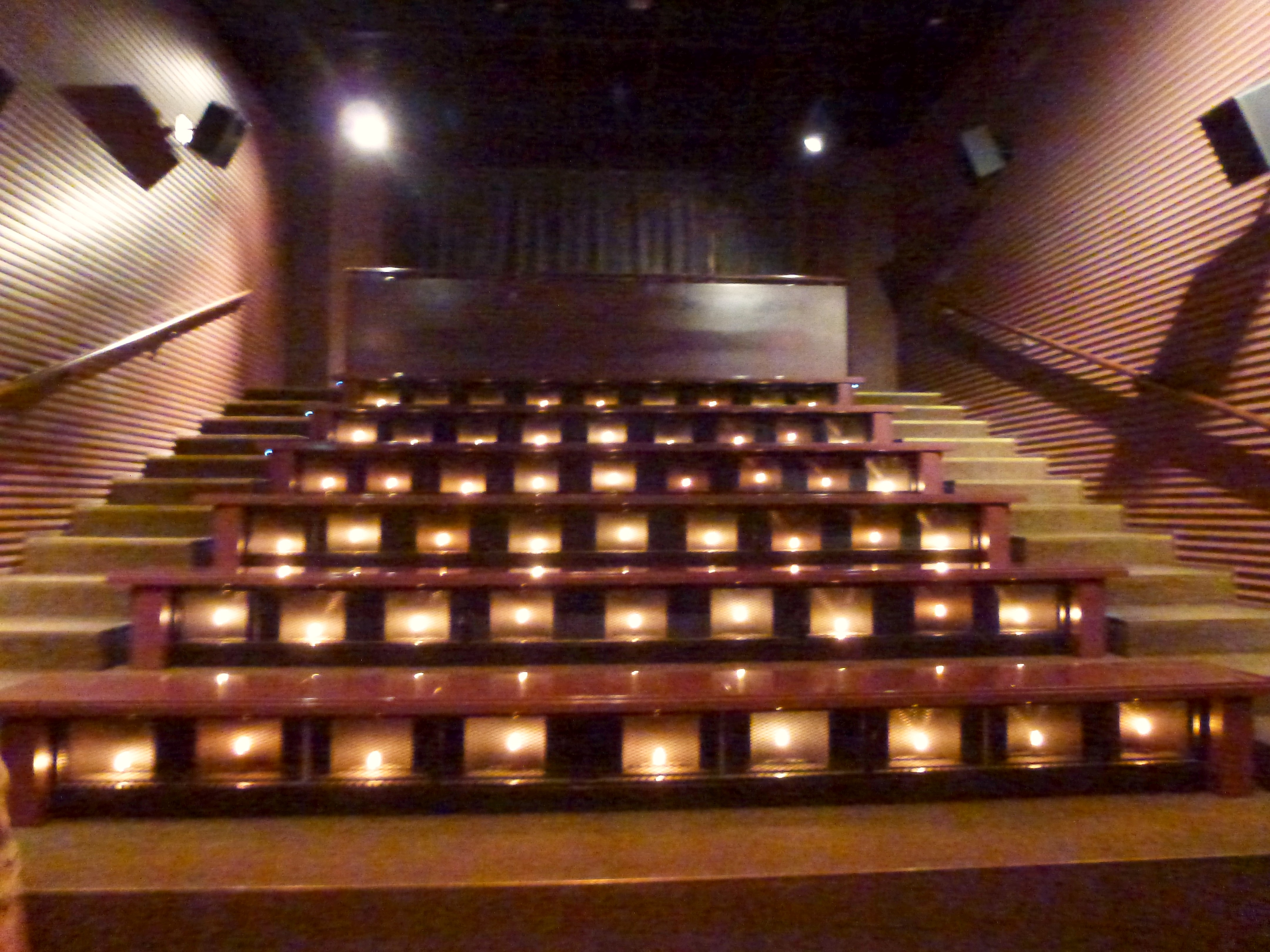
The movie room
