= Asakusa Culture Tourist Information Center =

Tourist information center in Tokyo, Japan

- 浅草文化観光センター
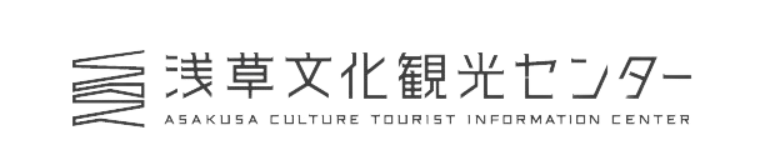

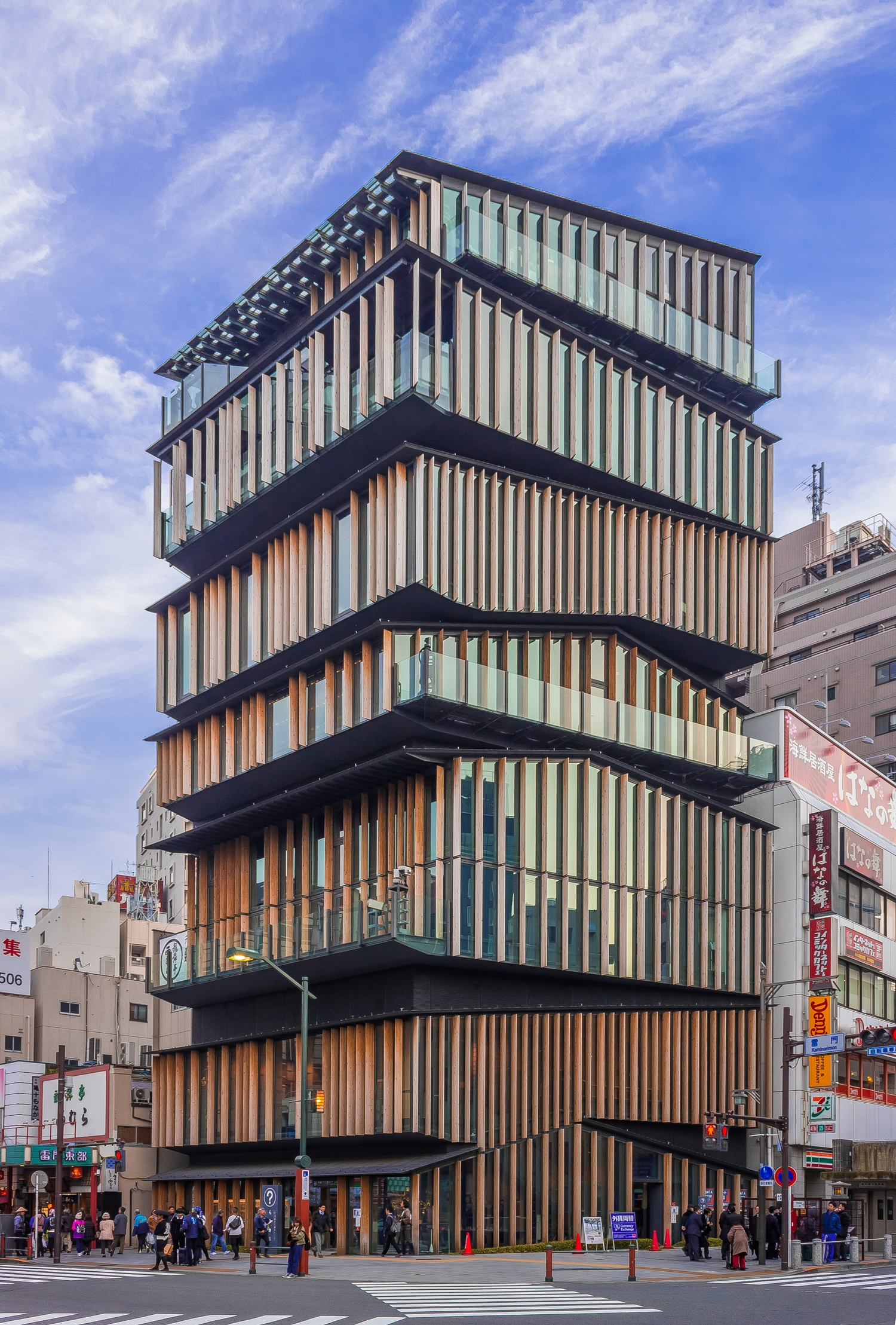
- The center in 2016

- Location within Special wards of Tokyo Asakusa Culture Tourist Information Center (Japan)

General information
- Location: Asakusa, Taitō, Tokyo, 2 Chome-18-9 Kaminarimon, Taitō, Tokyo 111-0034, Japan
- Coordinates: 35°42′38″N 139°47′47″E
- Year built: 2010-2012
- Opened: 20 April 2012
- Cost: 1.2 billion JPY (with tax) (Note: Precisely 1,187,392,500 JPY, including tax.)
- Owner: Japan Tourism Agency

Height
- Height: 38.9 m (128 ft)

Technical details
- Material: Steel, wood, and glass
- Floor count: 8
- Floor area: 2,159.52 m^{2} (23,244.9 ft^{2})
- Grounds: 326.23 m^{2} (3,511.5 ft^{2})

Design and construction
- Architects: Kengo Kuma & Associates
- Developer: Taitō City
- Structural engineer: Makino Structural Design
- Other designers: Electrical Engineer: Izumi Okayasu Lighting Design; Decorators: Yoko Ando, Kensaku Kato
- Awards and prizes: 2012 Good Design Award

The Asakusa Culture Tourist Information Center is a building primarily containing tourist facilities, amongst other amenities in the Asakusa district of Tokyo's Taitō ward. Along with its features, the building is also an attraction due to its architecture, as it was designed by Kengo Kuma, a noted architect. It is located directly across the street from the Kaminarimon and is open from 9:00 am to 8:00 pm. The center's motto is "Finding, Showing and Supporting".

It was a recipient of the 2012 Good Design Award.

== History ==
The plot of land that the center stands on was previously occupied by a two-story bank. After the bank moved, the land was bought by Taitō to create a building for tourists, which opened in 1985. It was fairly popular, receiving about 550,000 visitors in 2008. By 2008, the building had deteriorated and a competition was held to design a new building, with Kengo Kuma being the winner. The center was originally going to be 41.3 m (135 ft) tall, but the city's assembly raised concerns that it could disrupt the scenery around the building. Because of this, its height was reduced to 38.9 m (128 ft).

Designing took place from January 2009 to January 2010, and the building was built from August 2010 to February 2012. The center opened on 20 April 2012.

== Features ==
=== Design ===
The steel-based building is essentially "a stack of separate wooden buildings that have been piled up on top of each other at different angles", according to architecture media company Architizer. The exterior focuses mostly on wood (mainly Japanese cedar) and glass, which reflects traditional Japanese architecture while adding a contemporary twist. Due to Tokyo's infamy in the past as being prone to fire, Kuma processed the wood first to make sure it was fireproof. The louvers are vertical to emphasize the roof and floor.

When designing the center, Kuma was reminded of the traditional nagaya houses from Tokyo's Edo period, stacking a more modern version of these dwellings on top of each other, trying to create an unbalanced void in between each of the floors. Because of the slanted style of the roofs, there was some extra space between each floor. Kuma used these voids to store equipment and technical facilities, saying "We are too used to the idea that the floors have to be flat, but I hope I was able to inspire people to re-think the relationships of buildings and floors." The windows have black curtains to add to the depth of the building and the windows are double glazed to have low emissivity. The roof is made from a large galvalume steel sheet.

The first and second floors have an atrium, while the sixth floor takes advantage of the slanted roof to create a terraced floor that functions as a theater.

=== Amenities ===
The center contains a café, an exhibition space, a currency exchange, a conference hall, free Wi-Fi, computers, and restrooms. It also organizes free English language tours around Asakusa each weekend. The information counter near the entrance offers services in English, Chinese, Korean, and Japanese. Maps and brochures can be found there as well. There is also a miniature model of the district with most of its landmarks labeled.

The exhibition space, on the seventh floor, presents panels that display the history of Asakusa and Taitō. The eighth floor is a covered observation deck. There, people can experience views of Sensō-ji, Sumida River, the Tokyo Skytree, and the Asahi Beer Hall. Miharashi Café, on the same floor, offers light refreshments.
