= Kaminarimon =

Gate entrance in Asakusa, Japan

- Gate
- 雷門
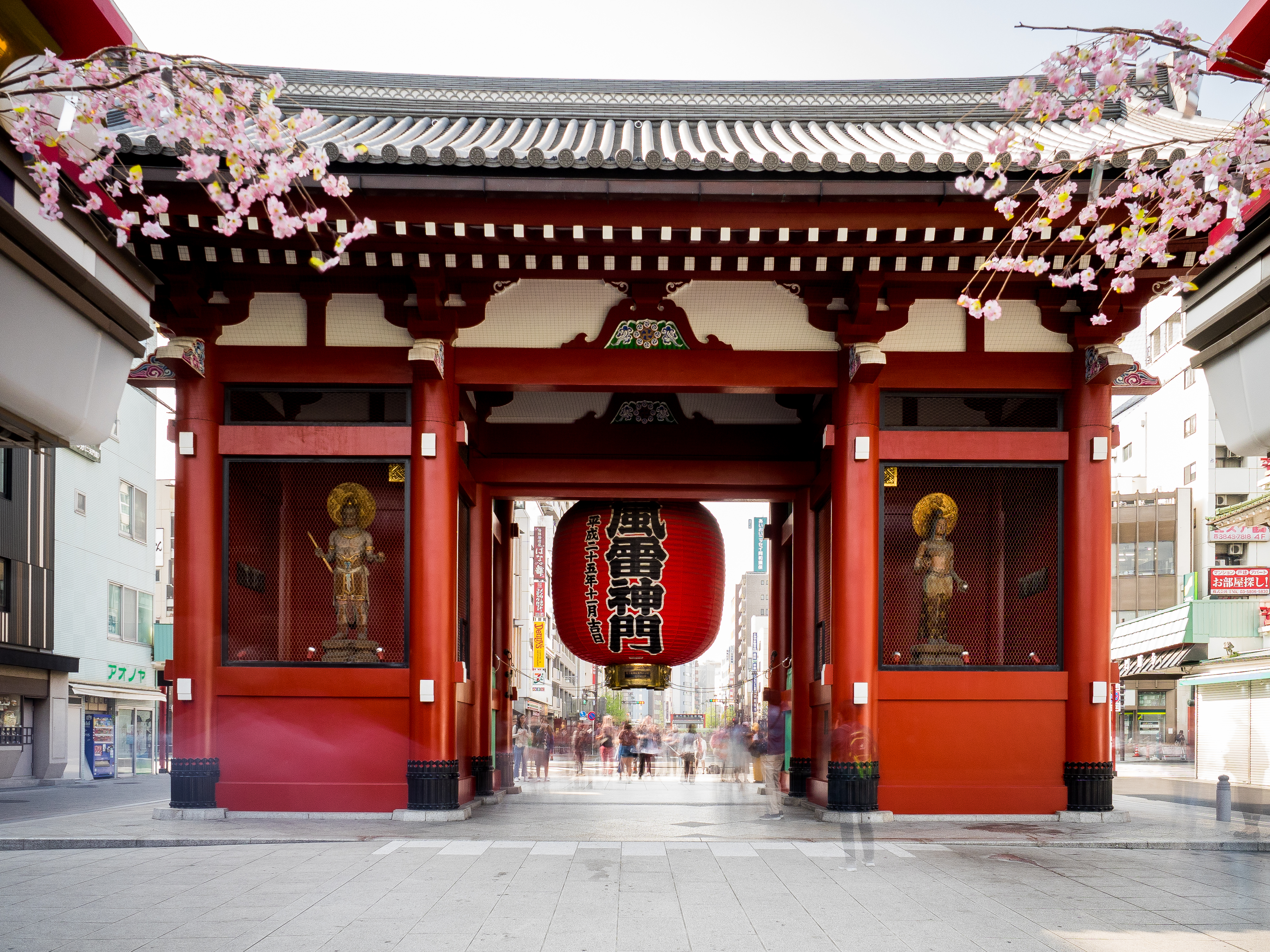
- The back of the Kaminarimon
- Completed: 941 (Current gate: 1960)
- Height: 11.7 m (38 ft)
- Length: 11.4 m (37 ft)
- Area: 69.3 m^{2} (746 sq ft)
- Location: Asakusa, Tokyo, Japan
- Location within Special wards of Tokyo Location within Japan
- Coordinates: 35°42′40″N 139°47′47″E

The Kaminarimon (雷門; lit."Thunder Gate") is the outer of two large entrance gates that ultimately leads to the Sensō-ji (the inner being the Hōzōmon) in Asakusa, Tokyo, Japan. The gate, with its lantern and statues, is popular with tourists. It stands at 11.7 m tall, 11.4 m wide and covers an area of 69.3 m^{2}. The first gate was built in 941, but the current gate dates from 1960, after the previous gate was destroyed in a fire in 1865.

== History ==
The Kaminarimon was first built in 941 AD by Taira no Kinmasa, a military commander. It was originally located near Komagata, but it was reconstructed in its current location in 1635. This is believed to be when the gods of wind and thunder were first placed on the gate. The gate has been destroyed many times throughout the ages. Four years after its relocation, the Kaminarimon burned down, and in 1649 AD, Tokugawa Iemitsu had the gate rebuilt along with several other of the major structures in the temple complex. The gate burned to the ground in 1757 AD and again in 1865 AD. The Kaminarimon's current structure was dedicated in December 1960 AD. Ninety-five years after the last fire, Kōnosuke Matsushita, the founder of Matsushita Electric Industrial Company (now Panasonic), was asked to rebuild the gate. With monetary donations from Matsushita, the gate was rebuilt in 1960.

== Features ==
Four statues are housed in the Kaminarimon, two in the front alcoves and two on the other side. On the front of the gate, the statues of the Shinto gods Fūjin and Raijin are displayed. Fūjin, the god of wind, is located on the east side of the gate, while Raijin, the god of thunder, is located on the west side. The original sculptures were severely damaged in the fire of 1865, with only the heads being saved, and the statues restored for the gate's 1960 reconstruction.

Two additional statues stand on the reverse of the gate: the Buddhist god Tenryū on the east, and the goddess Kinryū on the west side. These were donated in 1978 to commemorate the 1350th anniversary of the first appearance of the bodhisattva Kannon (Avalokiteśvara) at Asakusa, which led to the founding of Sensō-ji. The statues were carved by then-106-year-old master sculptor Hirakushi Denchū.

A giant red lantern (chōchin) hangs under the center of the gate. It is 3.9 meters tall, 3.3 meters wide and weighs approximately 700 kilograms (1,500 lb). The fifth iteration was built by Takahashi Chōchin K.K in 2013 and has the same metallic base on the bottom as the previous lantern. The current iteration is the sixth. The base has a name plate that says "Matsushita Denki", an abbreviated form of Panasonic's old Japanese name, Matsushita Denki Sangyo Kabushiki Gaisha. The front of the lantern displays the gate's name, Kaminarimon (雷門). Painted on the back is the gate's official name, Fūraijinmon (風雷神門). During festivals such as Sanja Matsuri, the lantern is collapsed to let tall objects pass through the gate.

The characters 金龍山 (Kinryū-zan) on the tablet above the lantern read from right to left and reference the Sensō-ji.

The Asakusa Culture Tourist Information Center is directly across the street from the gate.

The wooden carving of a dragon on the bottom of the great red lantern on the Kaminarimon, 2006	Entering Kaminarimon on a sunny day, 2020
