= Sanja Matsuri =

Shinto festival in Tokyo, Japan

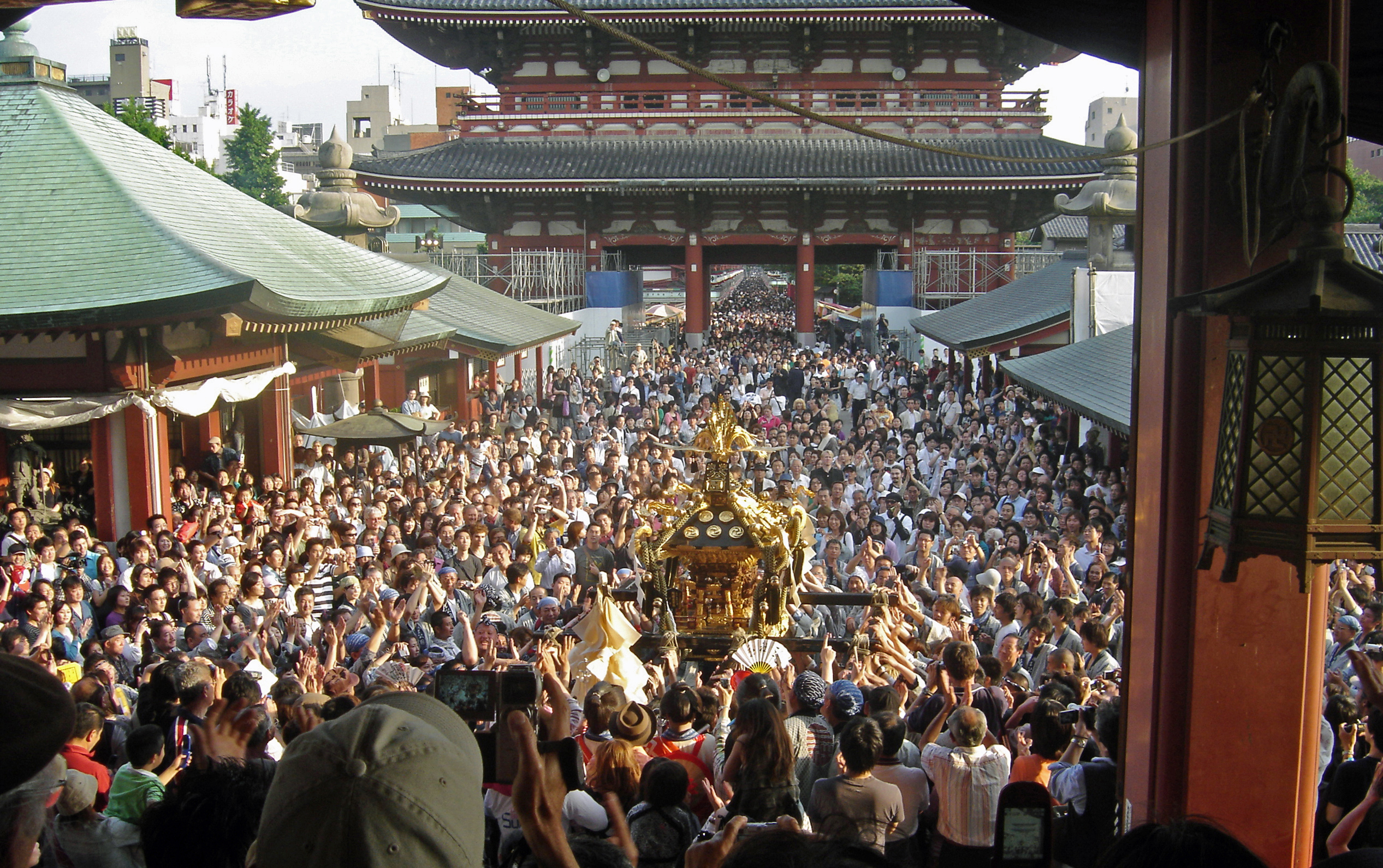
- A view of the Hōzōmon as well as one of the main mikoshi as seen from the top of the steps of the Sensō-ji
- Observed by: Tokyo
- Type: Religious
- Significance: Honors Hinokuma Hamanari, Hinokuma Takenari and Hajino Nakatomo, the three founders of Sensō-ji
- Begins: Friday
- Ends: Sunday
- Date: third Friday in May, third Saturday in May, third Sunday in May
- 2025 date: May 16, 2025
- 2026 date: May 15, 2026
- 2027 date: May 21, 2027
- 2028 date: May 19, 2028
- Duration: 3 days
- Frequency: annual

Scenes from Sanja Matsuri in 2013

Sanja Matsuri (三社祭; literally "Three Shrine Festival"), or Sanja Festival, is one of the three largest Shinto festivals in Tokyo. It is considered one of the wildest and largest in Japan. The festival is held in honor of Hinokuma Hamanari, Hinokuma Takenari, and Hajino Nakatomo, the three men who established and founded the Sensō-ji Buddhist temple. Sanja Matsuri is held on the third weekend of every May at Asakusa Shrine. Its prominent parades revolve around three mikoshi (the portable shrines referenced in the festival's name), as well as traditional music and dancing. Over the course of three days, the festival attracts 1.5–2 million locals and tourists every year.

== History ==
Like many Japanese festivals, Sanja Matsuri is a religious celebration, but it is an unusual survival of a cross-faith festival: it is a weekend-long Shinto festival that is dedicated to the kami (spirits) of three men who founded a Buddhist temple. It is believed that two fishermen—brothers named Hinokuma Hamanari and Hinokuma Takenari—found a statuette of the Bodhisattva Kannon caught in a fishing net in the Sumida River on the early morning of March 18, 628. The third man, a wealthy landlord named Hajino Nakatomo, heard about the discovery, approached the brothers and converted them to Buddhism. The three men then devoted their lives to the Buddhist faith and consecrated the statue in a small temple. This temple, now known as the Sensō-ji, currently houses the Kannon statue and is the oldest temple in Tokyo.

The Sanja Matsuri appears to have many forms that date back as early as the 7th century, as well as several names such as "Kannon Matsuri" and "Asakusa Matsuri". Sanja Matsuri's present day form was established during the Edo period. In 1649, shōgun Tokugawa Iemitsu commissioned the construction of Asakusa Shrine, a Shinto shrine dedicated to the three kami. The existence of this shrine helped to solidify the festival's importance as well as its current structure and organization.

== Description of events ==
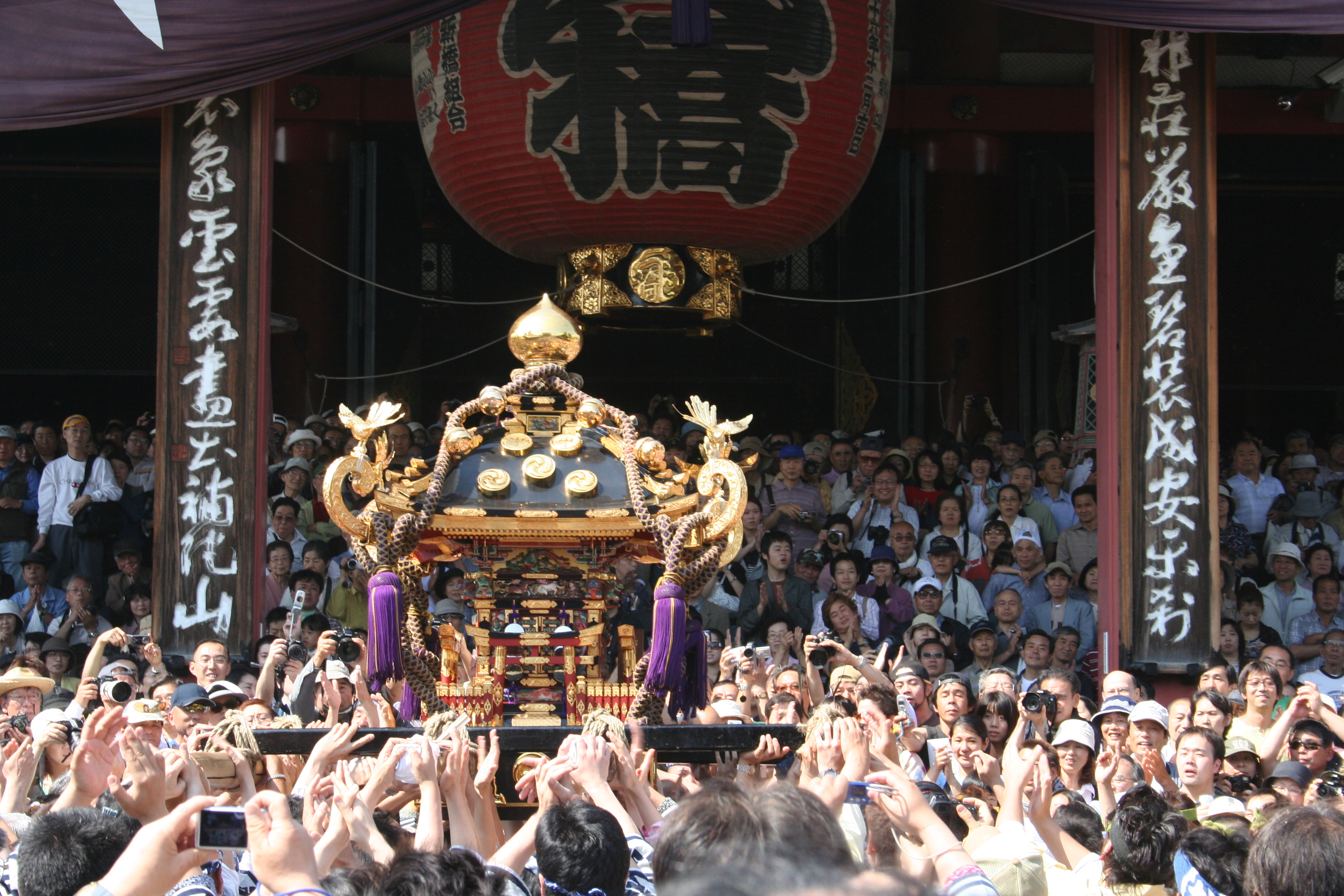
Asakusa Sanja Festival – a portable Shrine lifted in front of Sensō-ji temple.

Religious in origin, Sanja Matsuri is primarily a festival of celebration. The atmosphere around Asakusa during the weekend of the festival is charged and energetic. People continuously flood the streets surrounding the Sensō-ji and flutes, whistles, chanting and taiko (traditional Japanese drums) can be heard throughout the district.

The festival's main attractions are three Asakusa Shrine-owned mikoshi that appear on the third and final day of the festival. These three elaborate, black lacquered-wood shrines are built to act as miniature, portable versions of Asakusa Shrine. Decorated with gold sculptures and painted with gold leaf, each mikoshi weighs approximately one ton and cost ¥40 million ($390,760 in 2008) to construct. They are carried on four long poles lashed together with ropes, and each needs approximately 40 people dispersed evenly to safely carry them. Throughout the day, a total of about 500 people participate in carrying each shrine.

Mikoshi paraded in front of Asakusa Subway Station during Sanja Matsuri on may 17th, 2026

Because of the importance of these three mikoshi, they are spectacles as they are carried through the streets. The areas immediately surrounding each shrine are busy with people, and as they are carried, they are shaken and bounced vigorously. This action is believed to intensify the power of the kami that are seated in the shrines and helps to bestow good luck upon their respective neighborhoods. It is not unusual for there to be someone standing on the poles supporting the mikoshi shouting and waving in order to help direct the people carrying the shrine. This sense of direction can be essential when trying to keep the one ton mikoshi from accidentally colliding with street-side shops and causing considerable damage.

While the three primary mikoshi are the most important objects roaming the streets during the Sanja Matsuri, approximately 100 other smaller mikoshi are paraded through the neighborhood on Saturday. Of these shrines, several are solely carried by women or small children.

=== Day by day ===
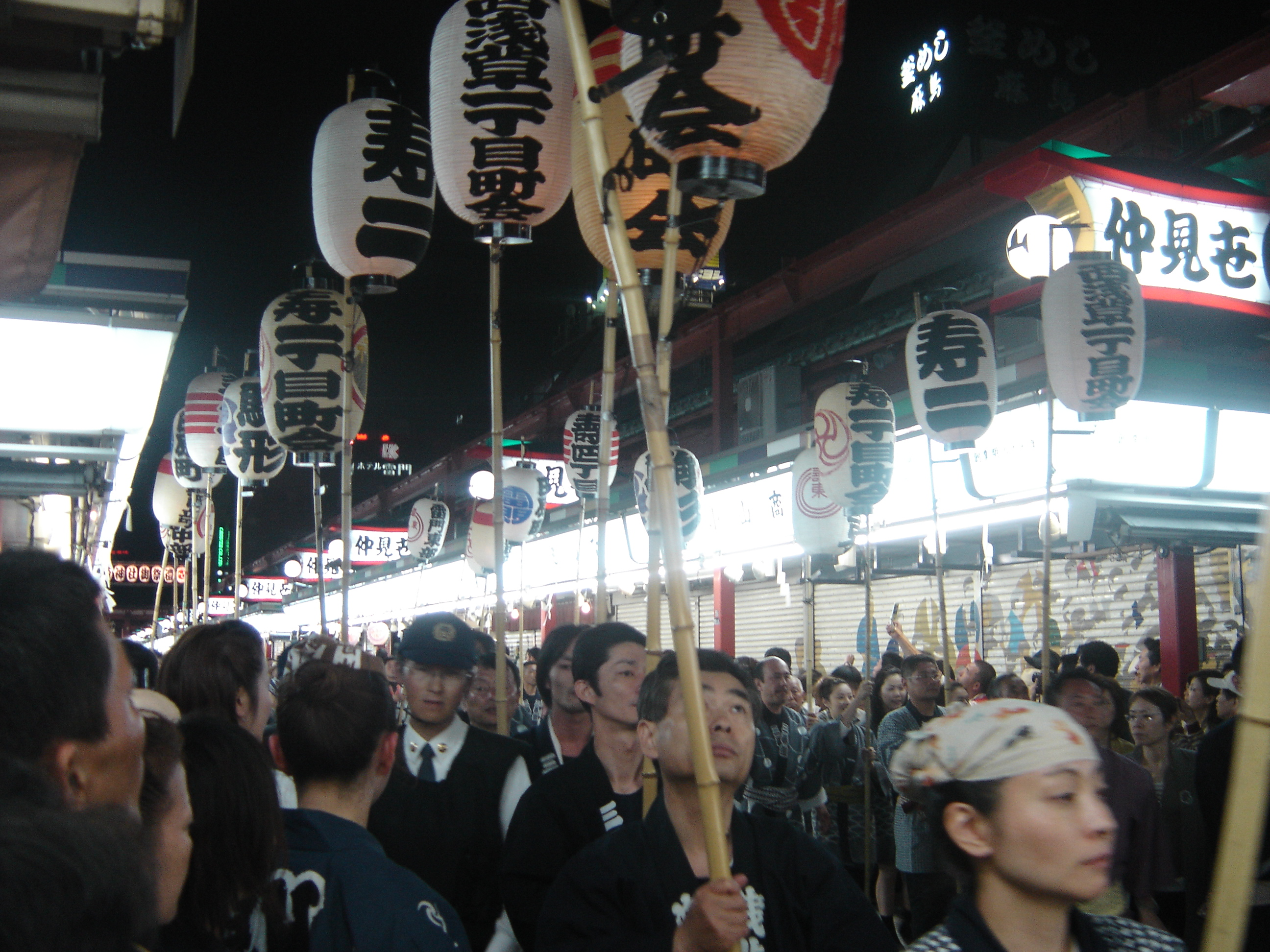
People paraded through the Nakamise during Sanja Matsuri.

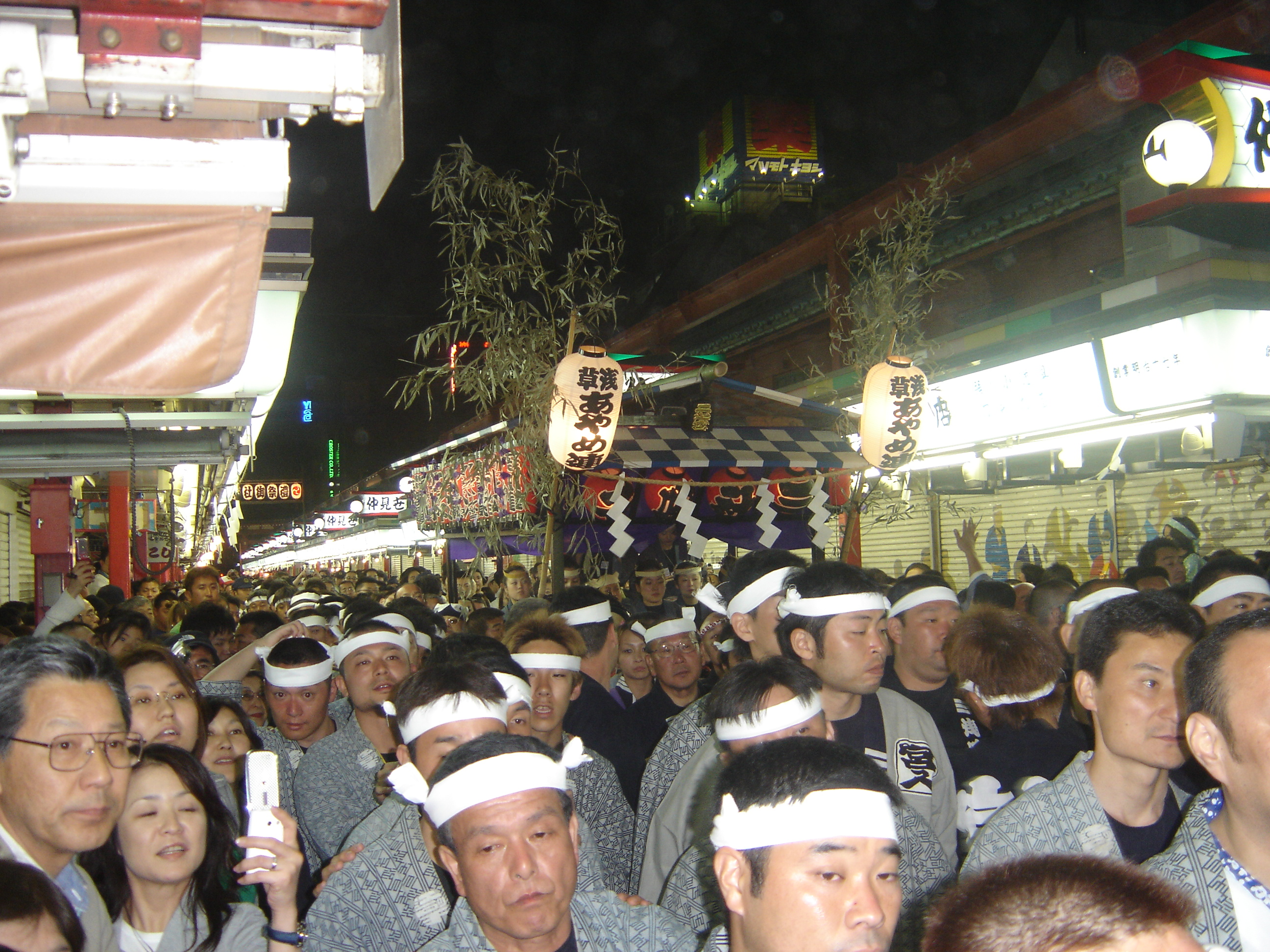
A music float is carried down Nakamise-dōri late Sunday night

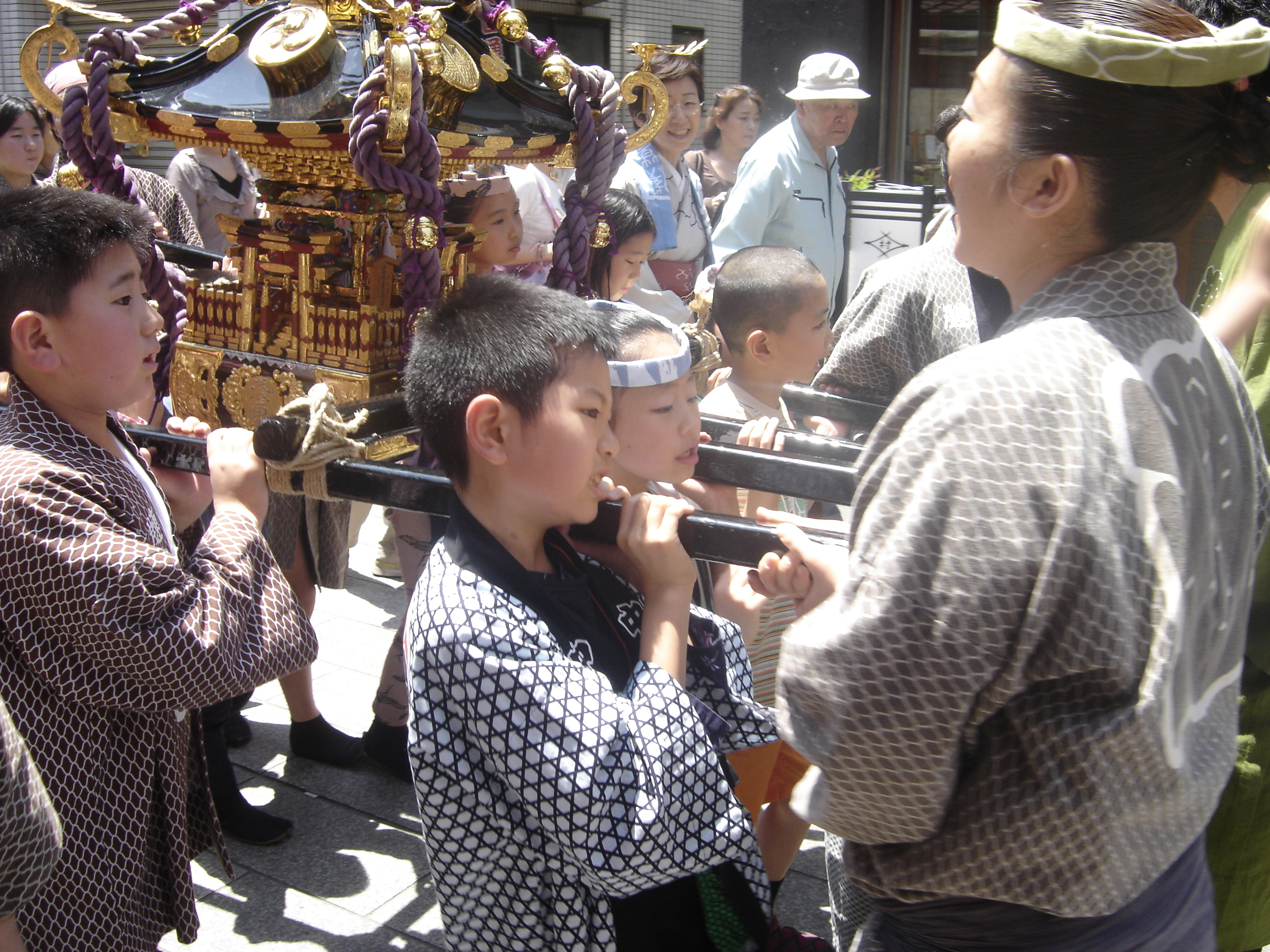
Children mikoshi

Though not a part of the festivities, the official start of the Sanja Matsuri begins on Thursday with an important religious ceremony. This ceremony requires Asakusa Shrine's head priest to perform a ritual that moves the enshrined kami of the three men at Asakusa Shrine to the three mikoshi that will be paraded around the Asakusa during the weekend. By opening the small doors located on each mikoshi (the interior is obscured to the public by a small cotton curtain), the three spirits are invited into the miniature shrines where they will reside for the duration of the festival.

The festival's more publicized beginning starts on Friday when the Daigyōretsu (大行列; literally "large parade") is held. This famous 19-block grand procession down Yanagi Street and Nakamise-dōri to Asakusa Shrine is an event that is used to energize the community. It is most known for its participants' lavish costumes, such as heron-hooded dancers, geisha and city officials wearing hakama (traditional Japanese clothing). Musicians, performers and dancers also parade down the streets of Asakusa in traditional Japanese attire during the procession. In the evening, six mikoshi from the most central neighborhoods are sent parading through the streets on the shoulders of several dozen people.

On the following day, Saturday, approximately 100 mikoshi from the 44 Asakusa districts gather at the Kaminarimon. They are then paraded through Nakamise-dōri and stop at the Hōzōmon where they pay their respects to Kannon. Afterwards, the mikoshi are carried to Asakusa Shrine where Shinto priests bless and purify them for the coming year. When the ceremony is completed, they are then carried back and paraded through their respective neighborhoods.

Sanja Matsuri's most important events occurs on the following Sunday. The procession of the three Asakusa Shrine-owned mikoshi begin their march down Nakamise-dōri toward the Kaminarimon early Sunday morning. These three elaborate shrines honor and represent the three men responsible for founding the Sensō-ji. During this final day of the festival, these important mikoshi are split up in order to visit and bestow blessing to all 44 districts of downtown and residential Asakusa. When evening falls, the three shrines find their way back to Asakusa Shrine in another grand procession that lasts late into the night.

== Other attractions ==
In addition to the traditional events, Sanja Matsuri has several other popular draws. For example, festival goers can visit hundreds of shops found in the Nakamise, a street connecting the Kaminarimon and the Hōzōmon. Many small food stands are also erected in the surrounding areas for the entire weekend. Yakuza members also proudly show off their tattoos.

Other spectacles that draw crowds are the Geisha and taiko performances that take place at specific times throughout the weekend. On Saturday and Sunday, Geisha that don their traditional attire put on performances from 1–3 p.m. on the second floor of the Asakusa Kenban. These performances, which require visitors to purchase tickets, have been ranked as one of the 10 best Geisha shows in all of Japan. On Sunday afternoon, members of the Nihon Taiko Dojo, a prominent Tokyo taiko academy, perform a free half-hour traditional music show at Asakusa Shrine.

== Festival schedule ==
Though there are many activities during Sanja Matsuri that are not time dependent, there are a few events that start and stop at specific times throughout the weekend.

Time	Event	Description	Location	Notes
Preparation, Thursday
7 a.m.	Asakusa Shrine's Kami Relocation	The head priest moves the kami from Asakusa Shrine to the respective mikoshi	Asakusa Shrine	
Day 1, Friday
1 p.m.	Daigyōretsu begins	Large parade involving many people and floats	Yanagi St. & Nakamise-dōri	
2:20 p.m.	Binzasara Dance	Traditional dance used to pray for prosperity and a good harvest	Haiden (hall in Asakusa Shrine)	
3 p.m.	Binzasara Dance	Traditional dance used to pray for prosperity and a good harvest	Kaguraden (pavilion in Asakusa Shrine)	
Day 2, Saturday
12:30 p.m.	Local mikoshi depart	About 100 mikoshi from 44 districts of Asakusa begin their tour of the town	Asakusa Shrine	
Day 3, Sunday
6 a.m.	Three main mikoshi depart	3 main mikoshi depart from Asakusa shrine to start their tour of the districts of Asakusa	Asakusa Shrine	
8 p.m.	Three main mikoshi return	After touring the districts of Asakusa, the 3 main mikoshi return	Asakusa Shrine	

== See also ==
- Culture of Japan
- Japanese calendar
