= Hōzōmon =

Main gate of Senso-ji, Tokyo

Coordinates: 35°42′50.26″N 139°47′48″E

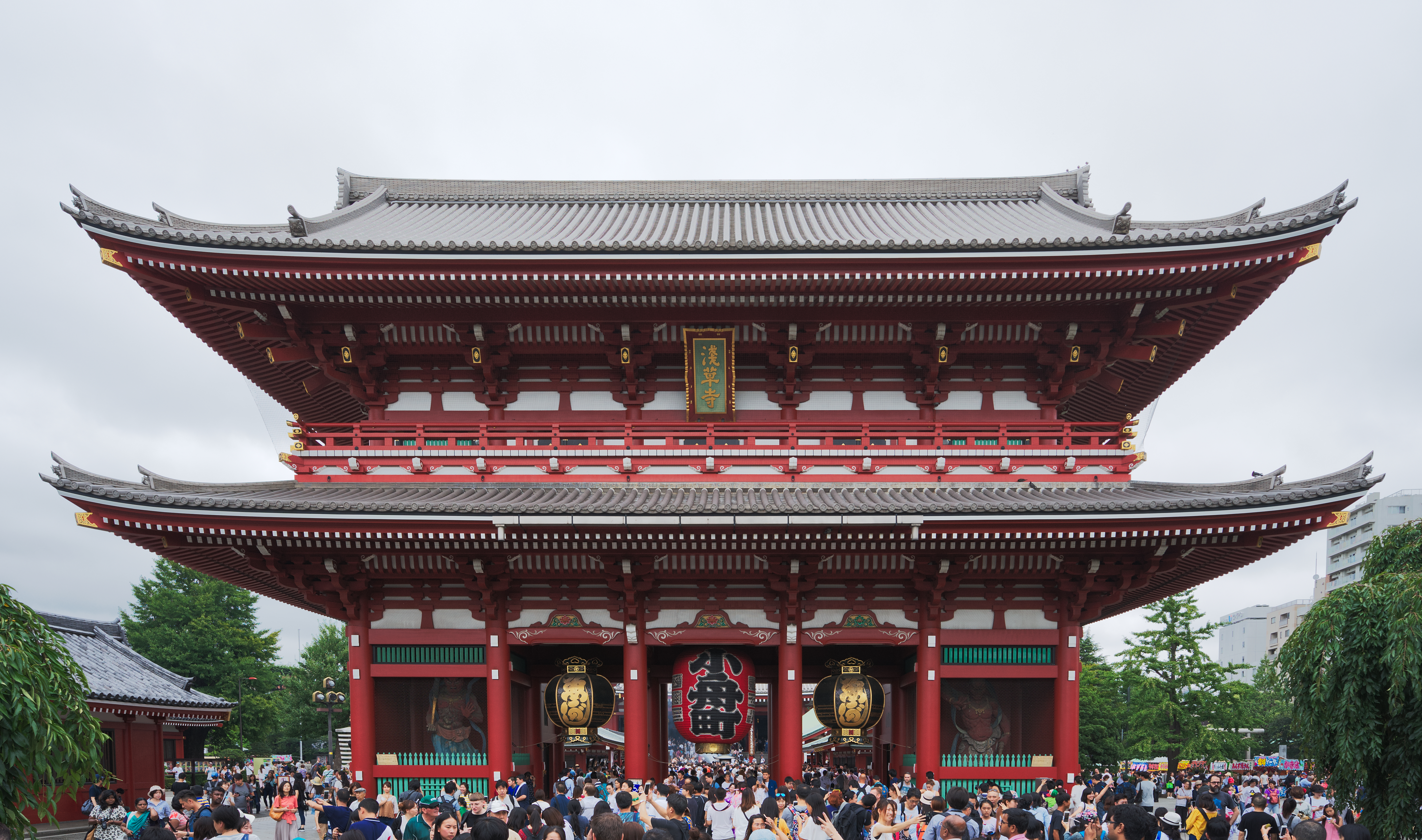
The south face of the hōzōmon

The Hōzōmon (宝蔵門, "Treasure-House Gate") is the inner of two large entrance gates that ultimately leads to the Sensō-ji (the outer being the Kaminarimon) in Asakusa, Tokyo. A two-story gate (nijūmon), the Hōzōmon's second story houses many of the Sensō-ji's treasures. The first story houses two statues, three lanterns and two large sandals. It stands 22.7 metres (74 ft) tall, 21 metres (69 ft) wide, and 8 metres (26 ft) deep.

== History ==
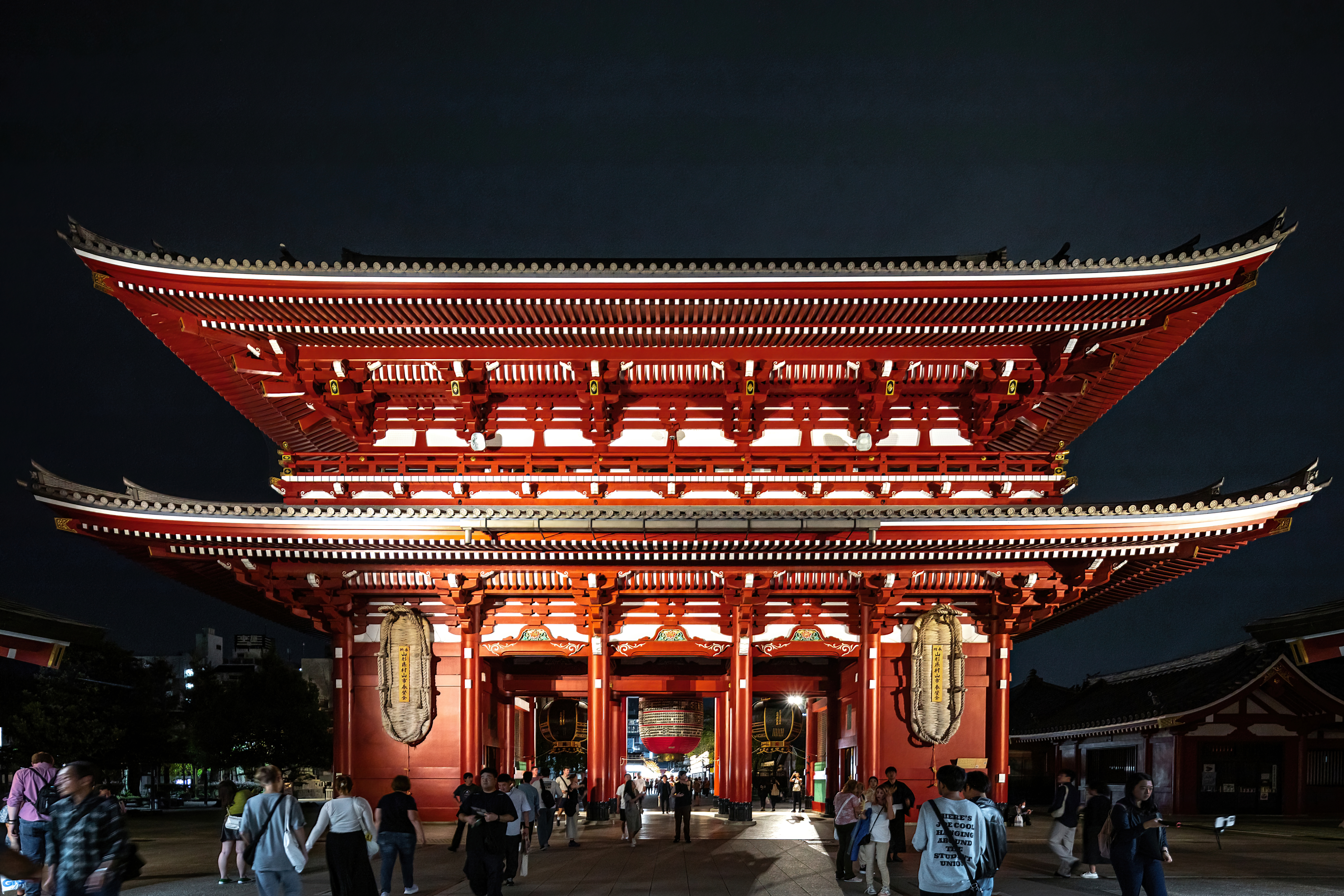
The gate's north face

The Hōzōmon was first built in 942 AD by Taira no Kinmasa. Destroyed by fire in 1631, it was rebuilt by Tokugawa Iemitsu in 1636. It stood for 300 more years until it was once again burned down during the Tokyo air raids of 1945. In 1964, the present steel-reinforced concrete structure was built with a donation of ¥150 million from Yonetarō Otani and his wife.

Since the gate was reconstructed using flame-resistant materials, the upper story of the Hōzōmon stores the Sensō-ji's treasured sutras. These treasures include a copy of the Lotus Sutra that is designated a Japanese National Treasure and the Issai-kyō, a complete collection of Buddhist scriptures that has been designated an Important Cultural Property.

== Features ==
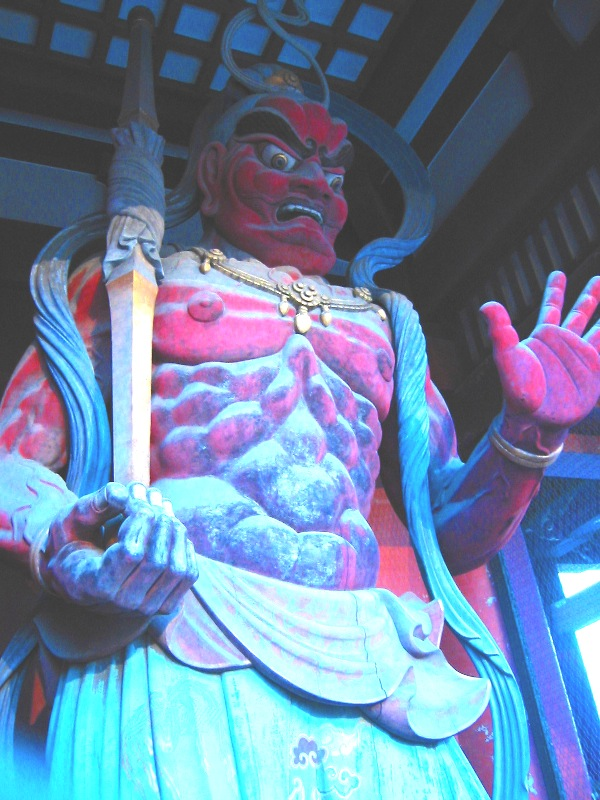
One of the Niō statues that stand on either side of the gate's south face

Unlike the Kaminarimon, which houses four different statues, the Hōzōmon houses two guardian statues that are located on either side of the gate's south face. These 5.45-metre-tall statues represent Niō, the guardian deities of the Buddha. Because of these statues, the gate was originally called the Niōmon (仁王門, "Niō Gate") before it was renamed the Hōzōmon.

The gate also features three large lanterns. The largest and most prominent lantern is a red chōchin that hangs under the center of the gate's opening. With a height of 3.75 m, a diameter of 2.7 m and a weight of 400 kg, the lantern displays the name of the town Kobunachō (小舟町). The current iteration of the lantern dates back to 2003 when ¥5 million was donated by the people of Kobunachō. Its donation commemorated the 400th-year-anniversary of the start of the Edo period. On either side of the chōchin hangs two 2.75 metre-tall copper Tōrō weighing approximately 1000 kg each. All three lanterns are completely removed during festivals such as Sanja Matsuri.

On the Hōzōmon's north (back) face are the waraji, two 4.5 m long, 1.5 m wide straw sandals that weigh 400 kg each.

== See also ==
- Asakusa Shrine
- Traditional lighting equipment of Japan
