= Asakusa Shrine =

Shinto shrine in Asakusa district, Tokyo, Japan

Asakusa Shrine 浅草神社
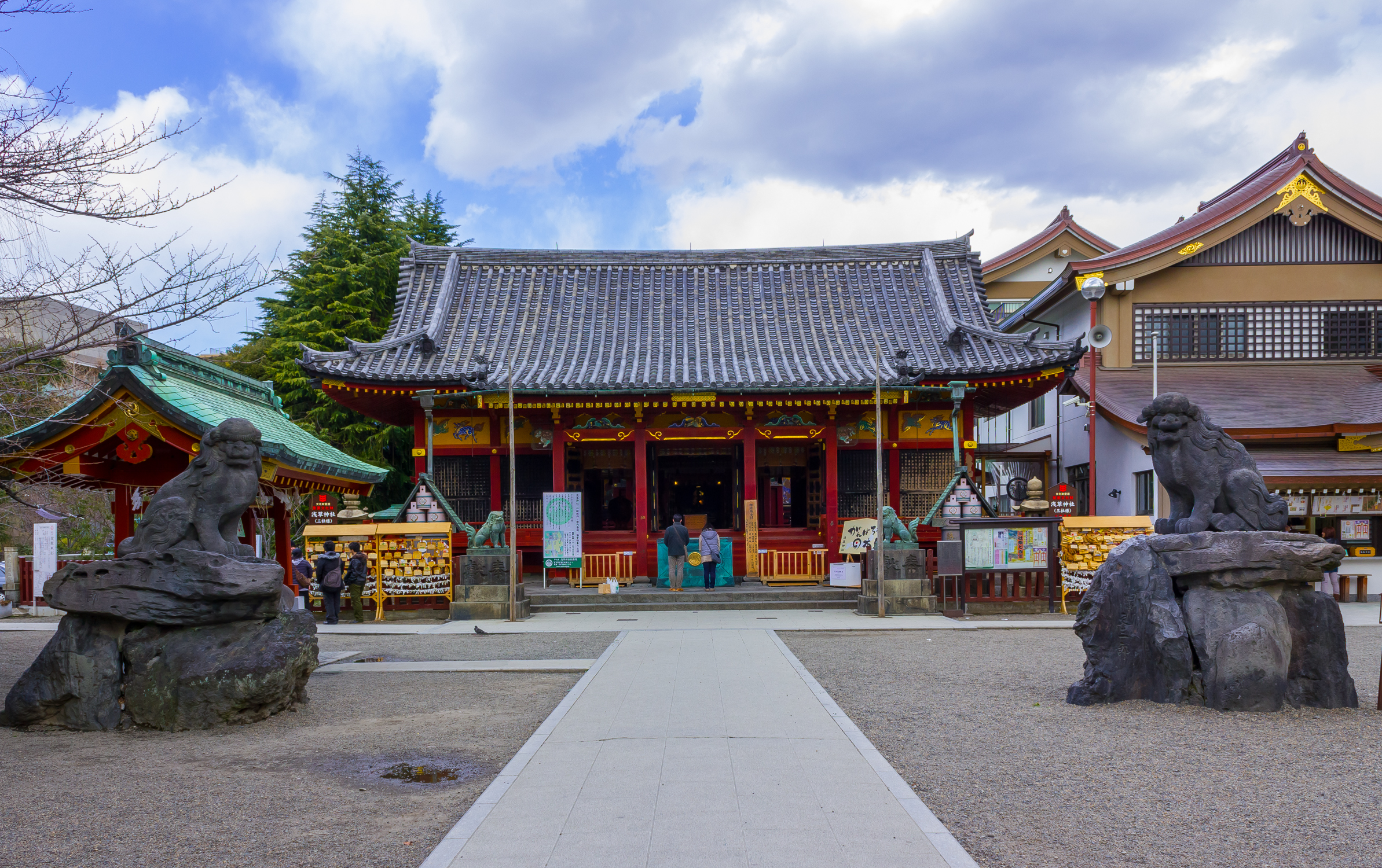

- Location within Japan

Religion
- Affiliation: Shinto
- Deity: Hinokuma Hamanari; Hinokuma Takenari; Hajino Matsuchi; Ebisu

Location
- Location: 2-26-1, Asakusa, Taitō-ku; Tokyo 111-0032
- Interactive map of Asakusa Shrine 浅草神社
- Coordinates: 35°42′54.50″N 139°47′50.77″E

Architecture
- Style: Gongen-zukuri
- Founder: Tokugawa Iemitsu
- Established: 1649

Website
- www.asakusajinja.jp/english/

Asakusa Shrine (浅草神社, Asakusa-jinja) is a Shinto shrine in the Asakusa district of Tokyo, Japan. Also known as Sanja-sama (Shrine of the Three gods), it is one of the most famous Shinto shrines in the city.

The shrine honors the three men who founded the neighboring Sensō-ji. Part of a larger grouping of sacred buildings in the area, Asakusa Shrine is on the east side of the Sensō-ji, down a street marked by a large stone torii. One of the only two buildings in the area to survive World War II, it is designated an Important Cultural Property due to its long history.

== History ==
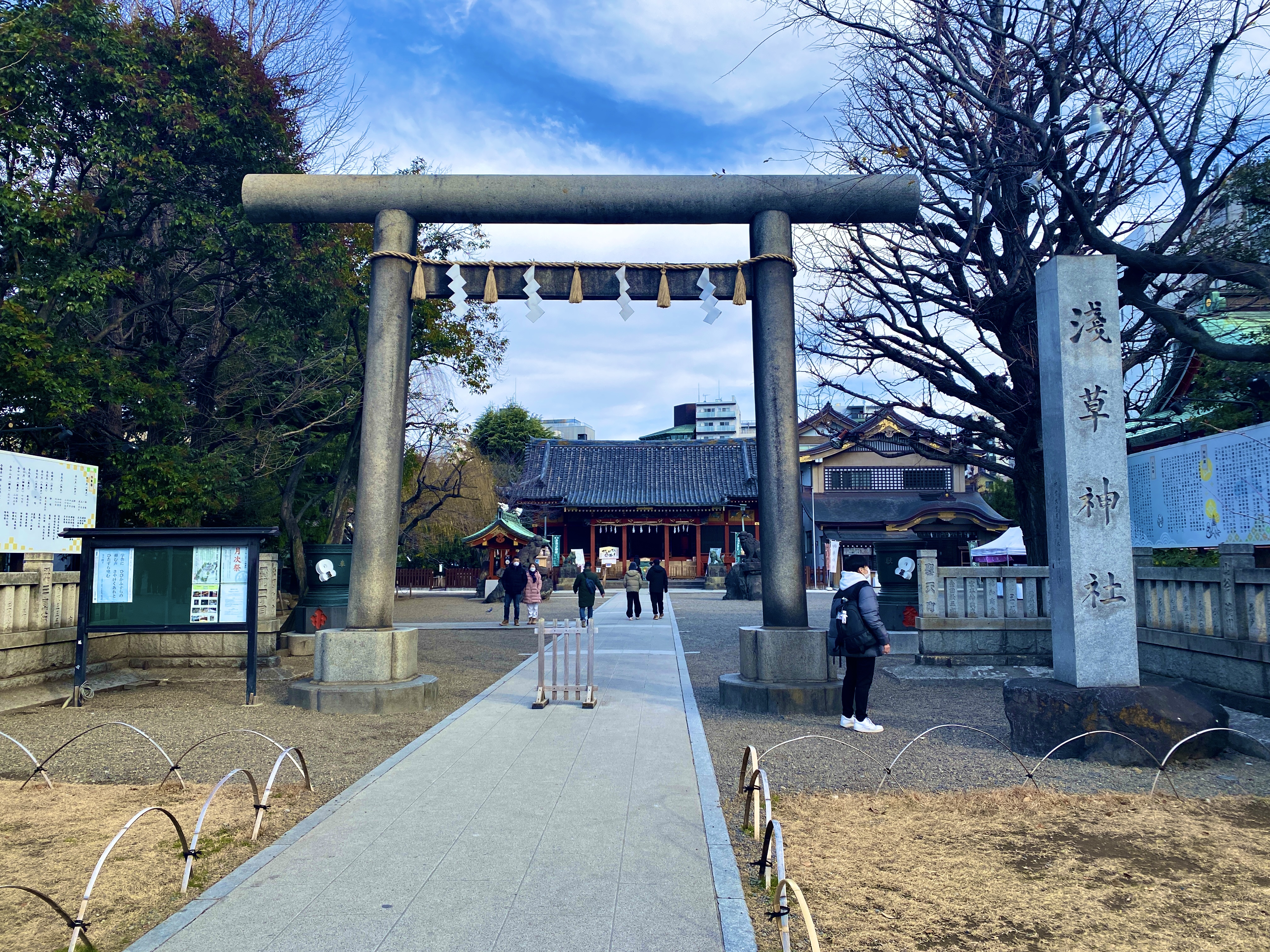
A torii marking the entrance to Asakusa Shrine

An example of the gongen-zukuri style of architecture, Asakusa Shrine was commissioned by Tokugawa Iemitsu and built in 1649 during Japan's Edo period. It was constructed to honor the three men who established and built the Sensō-ji.

Legend states that two brothers, fishermen named Hinokuma Hamanari and Hinokuma Takenari, found a bosatsu Kannon statuette caught in a fishing-net in the Sumida River on May 17, 628. The third man, a wealthy landlord named Haji no Matsuchi (Haji no Nakatomo), heard about the discovery and approached the brothers to whom he delivered an impassioned sermon about the Buddha. The brothers were very impressed and subsequently converted to the Buddhist religion. The Kannon statue was consecrated in a small temple by the landlord and the brothers who thereafter devoted their lives to preaching the way of Buddhism. This temple is now known as the Sensō-ji. Asakusa Shrine was built in order to worship these men as deities.

The shrine and its surrounding area and buildings have also been the site of many Shinto and Buddhist festivals for centuries. The most important and famous of these festivals is Sanja Matsuri, held in late May.

Unlike many other structures in the area, including the Sensō-ji, the shrine (along with the nearby Nitenmon gate to the Sensō-ji) survived the Tokyo air raids of 1945. Because of this rich history, it was designated an Important Cultural Property by the Japanese Government in 1951.

Buildings in addition to the main shrine include a kagura-den (kagura dance hall) and the Hikan Inari Shrine.

A Nishinomiya Inari shrine was once located near the Hōzōmon gate to Sensō-ji. After the Meiji government ordered the separation of Shinto and Buddhism in 1868, the Nishinomiya shrine became part of the Asakusa Shrine and was located near the kagura-den, where it was destroyed in the 10 March 1945 firebombing.
