= Sensō-ji =

Buddhist temple in Tokyo, Japan

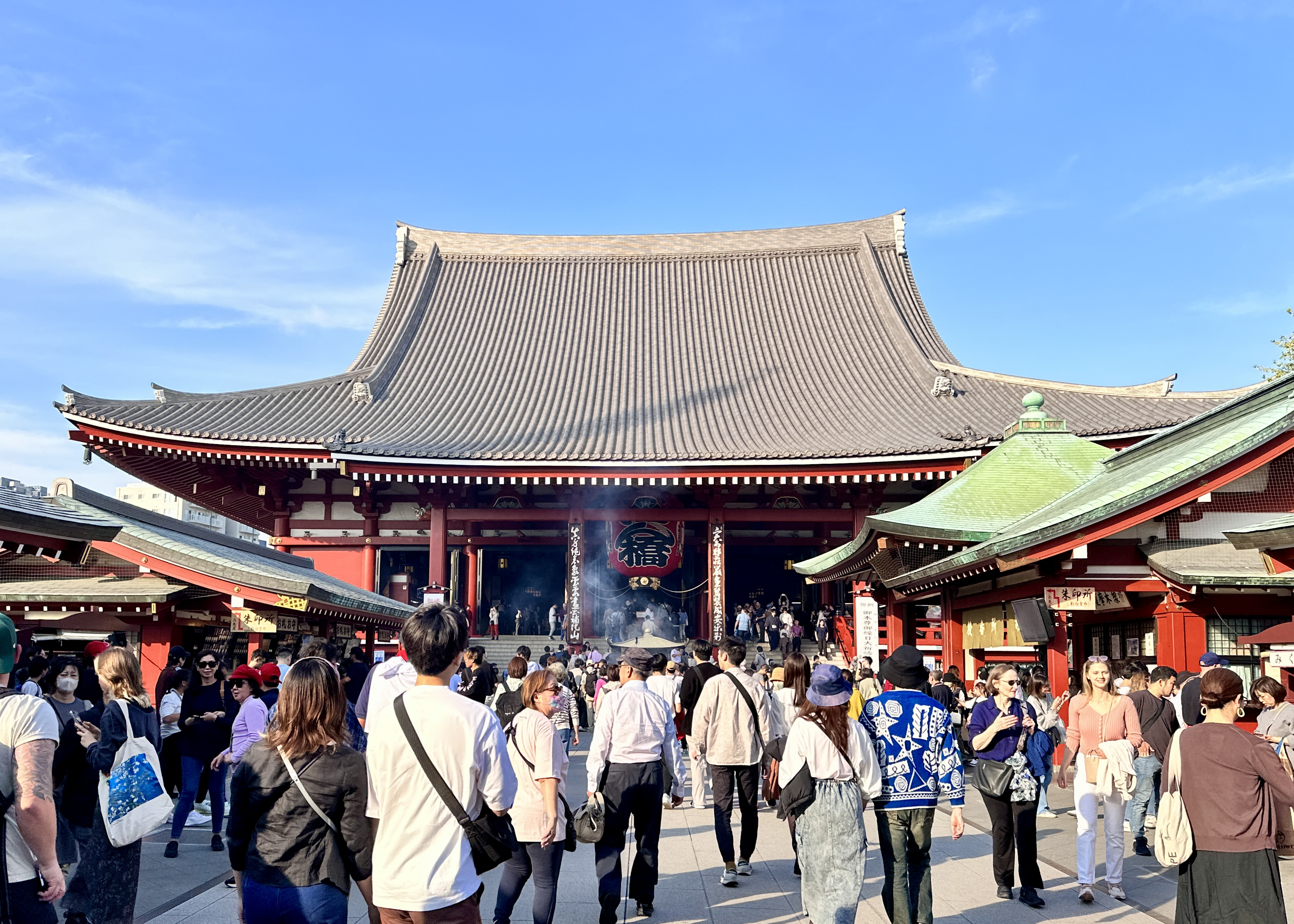
- Sensō-ji Main Hall in 2023

- Sensō-ji Sensō-ji (Japan)

Religion
- Affiliation: Buddhist
- Sect: Shō-Kannon (independent school)
- Deity: Shō Kannon Bosatsu (Āryāvalokiteśvara)

Location
- Location: 2-3-1 Asakusa, Taitō-ku, Tokyo
- Country: Japan
- Coordinates: 35°42′53″N 139°47′48.3″E

Architecture
- Founder: Kaishō
- Completed: 645

Website
- www.senso-ji.jp
- National Treasure National Important Cultural Property National Place of Scenic Beauty

Sensō-ji (浅草寺 [sẽ̞ꜜɰ̃so̞ːʑi], Sensō-ji; officially Kinryū-zan Sensō-ji (金龍山浅草寺), also known as Asakusa Kannon (浅草観音)), is an ancient Buddhist temple in Asakusa, Tokyo, Japan. It is Tokyo's oldest established temple and one of its most significant. It is dedicated to Kannon, the bodhisattva of compassion. Structures in the temple complex include the main hall, a five-story pagoda and large gates. It is the most widely visited religious site in the world with over 30 million visitors annually. The temple is the 13th stop on the Bandō Sanjūsankasho pilgrimage route.

The temple was destroyed during a 10 March 1945 firebombing air raid on Tokyo during World War II. The main hall was rebuilt in the 1950s. Formerly associated with the Tendai sect of Buddhism, the temple became independent in 1950 after the war. Leading to it is Nakamise-dōri street, containing many shops with traditional goods. Adjacent to the east of Sensō-ji is the Asakusa Shrine of the Shinto religion.

== History ==
The origins of Sensō-ji are uncertain. According to legends found in sources such as the "Sensō Engi", the temple began in the Asuka period when the brothers Hinokuma Hamanari and Takenari discovered a statue of Kannon while fishing in the Sumida River in 628. The headman of their village, Haji no Nakatomo became a monk and converted his home into a temple. In 645, a monk named Katsumi renovated the temple and, following a revelation in a dream, designated the statue as a hibutsu image. The statue is said to be made of gold and measuring approximately 5.5 centimeters in height, but its true details is unknown as it is never displayed to the public. If this account is true, it would make Sensō-ji the oldest-established temple in Tokyo. In 857, during the early Heian period and in 828, Ennin visited the temple and carved a maedachi Kannon statue (a statue for people to worship in place of the secret image). In 942, when Taira no Kinmasa was appointed Musashi-no-kami, he renovated the shichidō garan, and the Kaminarimon Gate and Niōmon Gate were constructed at this time.

However, the first documented reference to Sensō-ji is in the Kamakura-period "Azuma Kagami." According to this chronicle, in 1181, carpenters were called in by Minamoto no Yoritomo from Asakusa to build Tsurugaoka Hachiman-gū in Kamakura. Additionally, in 1192, monks from Sensō-ji participated in the 49th day memorial service for Emperor Goshirakawa held at Shōchōjū-in in Kamakura. Lady Nijō described her visit to Sensō-ji in her Towazugatari in 1290. In 1590, Tokugawa Ieyasu, who was in Edo, designated Senso-ji as an official place of prayer for the shogunate and granted the temple 500 koku of land. Sensō-ji's buildings had burned down many times before the Edo period, and after the start of the Tokugawa shogunate, they were destroyed by fire twice, in 1631 and 1642. However, with the assistance of the third shogun, Tokugawa Iemitsu, the five-story pagoda was rebuilt in 1648 and the main hall in 1649. In 1685, shops that would become "Nakamise" were established on the main approach to the temple. The temple granted these businesses permission in exchange for charging local residents for cleaning the grounds. By the mid-Edo period, street performances and other events began to take place in the area at the back west of the temple grounds, commonly known as "Okuyama," and the temple grounds became a place of entertainment for the common people. Between 1843 and the following year, the three Edo theaters moved to Asakusa, further strengthening this trend.

Asakusa continued to thrive as a popular entertainment district into the Meiji period. In 1873, much of the temple grounds were designated as Asakusa Park. In 1890, the 12-story Ryōunkaku (commonly known as the "Asakusa Twelve-Story Tower"), a commercial facility and observation tower, was completed. While much of the Asakusa district was destroyed in the 1923 Great Kantō earthquake, a local construction master led the evacuees within the temple grounds in a bucket brigade firefighting operation, limiting damage to only a few buildings at Sensō-ji. However, the main hall (Kannon Hall), a former national treasure, and the five-story pagoda were destroyed in the 10 March 1945 firebombing air raid on Tokyo. The main hall was rebuilt in 1951–58 The temple now has a titanium tiled roof that maintains a historic image but is stronger and lighter. The Kaminarimon gate was rebuilt in 1960, the Hōzōmon gate in 1964, and the pagoda in 1973. After World War II, Asakusa temporarily declined due to the diversification of entertainment options and the development of other entertainment districts in Tokyo. However, thanks to efforts by the local shopping district, it gradually regained its former vitality and has become a representative tourist destination in Tokyo as a town that retains its old-fashioned atmosphere, with annual events such as the Hagoita Market and Hozuki Market attracting large crowds.

== Temple grounds ==
Sensō-ji is the focus of Tokyo's largest and most popular festival, Sanja Matsuri. This takes place over 3 to 4 days in late spring, and sees the surrounding streets closed to traffic from dawn until late evening.

Dominating the entrance to the temple is the Kaminarimon or "Thunder Gate". This imposing Buddhist structure features a massive paper lantern dramatically painted in vivid red-and-black tones to suggest thunderclouds and lightning. Beyond the Kaminarimon is Nakamise-dori with its shops, followed by the Hōzōmon or "Treasure House Gate", which provides the entrance to the inner complex. Within the precincts stand a stately five-story pagoda and the main hall, devoted to Kannon.

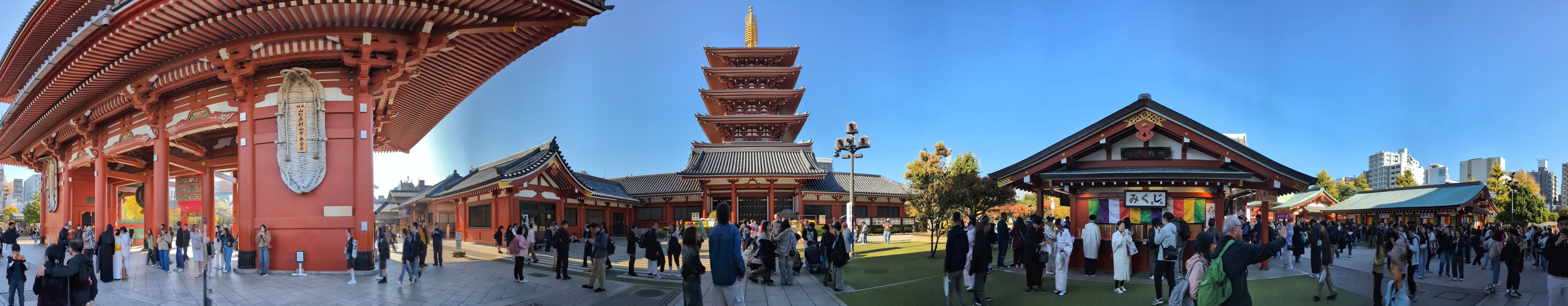
Hōzōmon Gate(left)・five-story pagoda(center)・Fortune Slip Shop(right)

Many tourists, both Japanese and from abroad, visit Sensō-ji every year. Catering to the visiting crowds, the surrounding area has many traditional shops and eating places that feature traditional dishes (hand-made noodles, sushi, tempura, etc.). Nakamise-Dori, the street leading from the Thunder Gate to the temple itself, is lined with small shops selling souvenirs ranging from fans, ukiyo-e (woodblock prints), kimono and other robes, Buddhist scrolls, traditional sweets, to Godzilla toys, t-shirts and mobile phone straps. These shops themselves are part of a living tradition of selling to pilgrims who walked to Sensō-ji.

Within the temple itself, and also at many places on its approach, there are o-mikuji stalls. For a suggested donation of 100 yen, visitors may consult the oracle and divine answers to their questions. Querents shake labelled sticks from enclosed metal containers and read the corresponding answers they retrieve from one of 100 possible drawers.

Within the temple is a quiet contemplative garden kept in the distinctive Japanese style.

The Nishinomiya Inari shrine was located within the precincts of Sensō-ji and a torii identified the entry into the hallowed ground of the shrine. A bronze plaque on the gateway structure listed those who contributed to the construction of the torii, which was erected in 1727 (Kyōhō 12, 11th month). After the Meiji government ordered the separation of Shinto and Buddhism in 1868, the Inari shrine was moved to the grounds of the Asakusa Shrine, where it was destroyed in the 10 March 1945 firebombing.

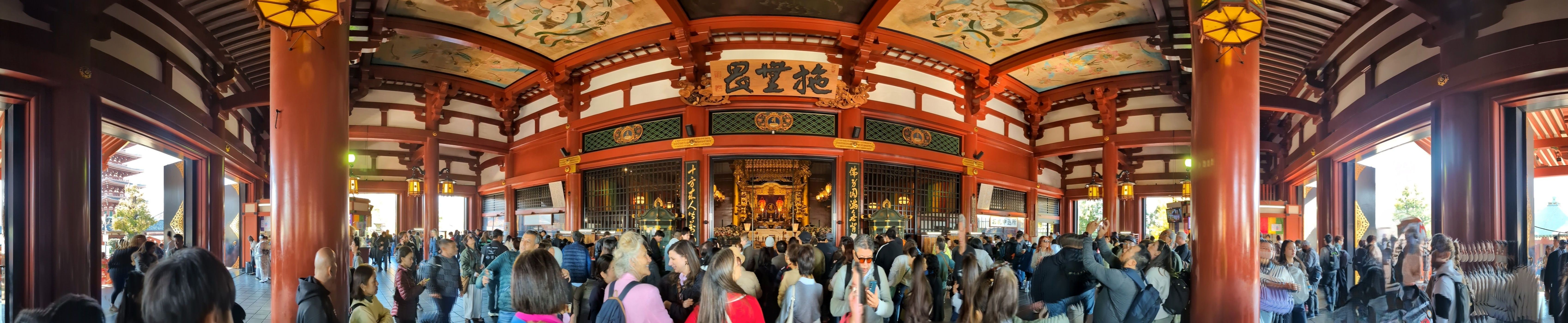
Inside the main hall

=== Kaminarimon ===
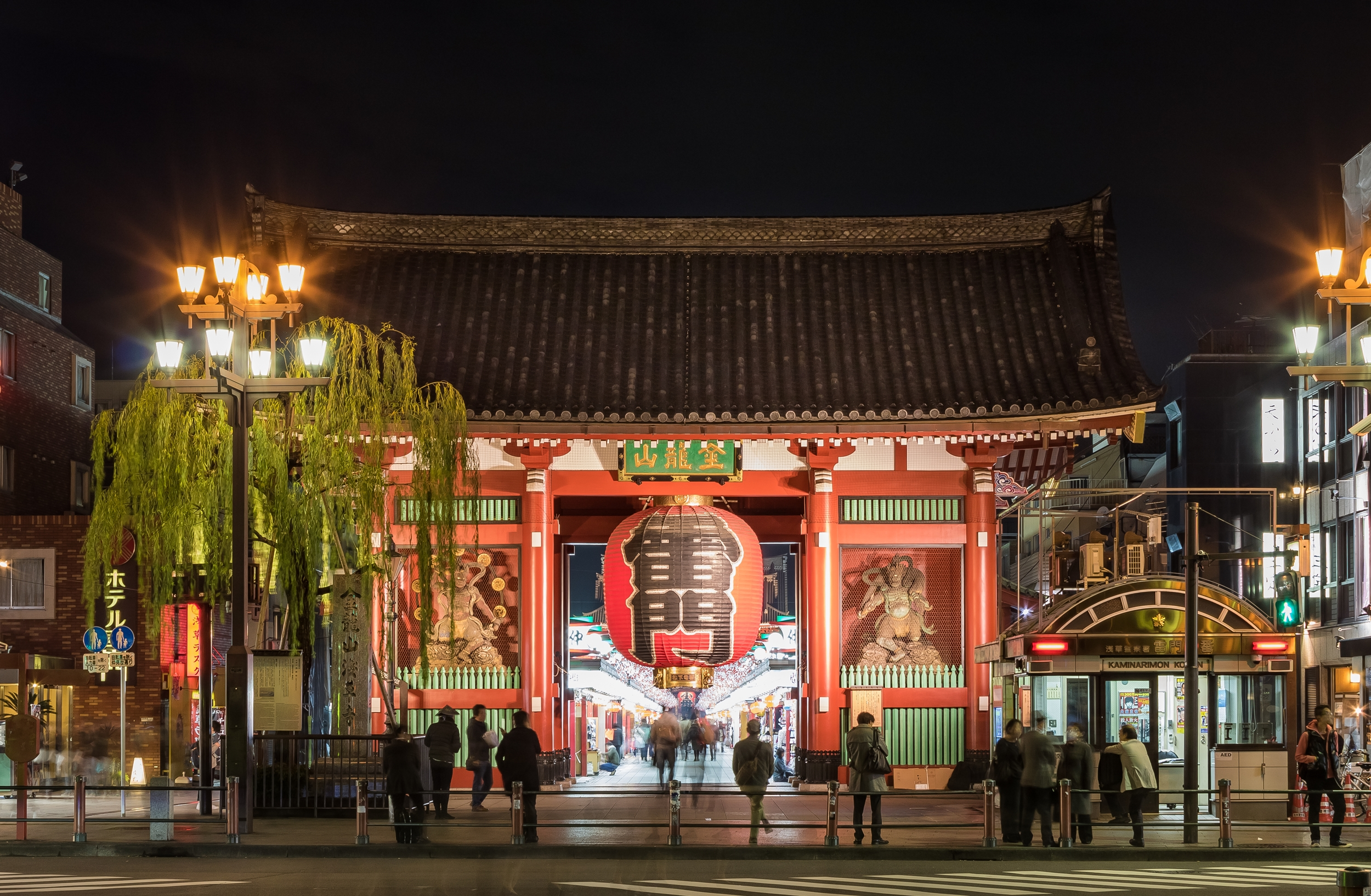
Kaminarimon. A statue of Fūjin stands on the right and that of Raijin on the left.

The Kaminarimon (雷門, "Thunder Gate") is the outer of two large entrance gates that ultimately lead to the Sensō-ji (the inner being the Hōzōmon) in Asakusa. The gate, with its lantern and statues, is popular with tourists. It stands 11.7 metres (38 ft) tall, 11.4 metres (37 ft) wide and covers an area of 69.3 square metres (746 sq ft). The first gate was built in 941, but the current gate dates back to 1960, after the previous gate was destroyed in a fire in 1865.

==== History ====
The Kaminarimon was first built in 941 AD by Taira no Kinmasa, a military commander. It was originally located near Komagata, but it was reconstructed in its current location in 1635. This is believed to be when the gods of wind and thunder were first placed on the gate. The gate has been destroyed many times throughout the ages. Four years after its relocation, the Kaminarimon burned down, and in 1649 AD Tokugawa Iemitsu rebuilt the gate along with several other of the major structures in the temple complex. The gate burnt to the ground in 1757 AD and again in 1865 AD. The Kaminarimon's current structure was dedicated in December 1960 AD . Ninety-five years after the last fire, Konosuke Matsushita, the founder of Matsushita Electric Industrial Company (now Panasonic), was asked to rebuild the gate. With monetary donations from Matsushita, it was rebuilt in 1960.

==== Features ====
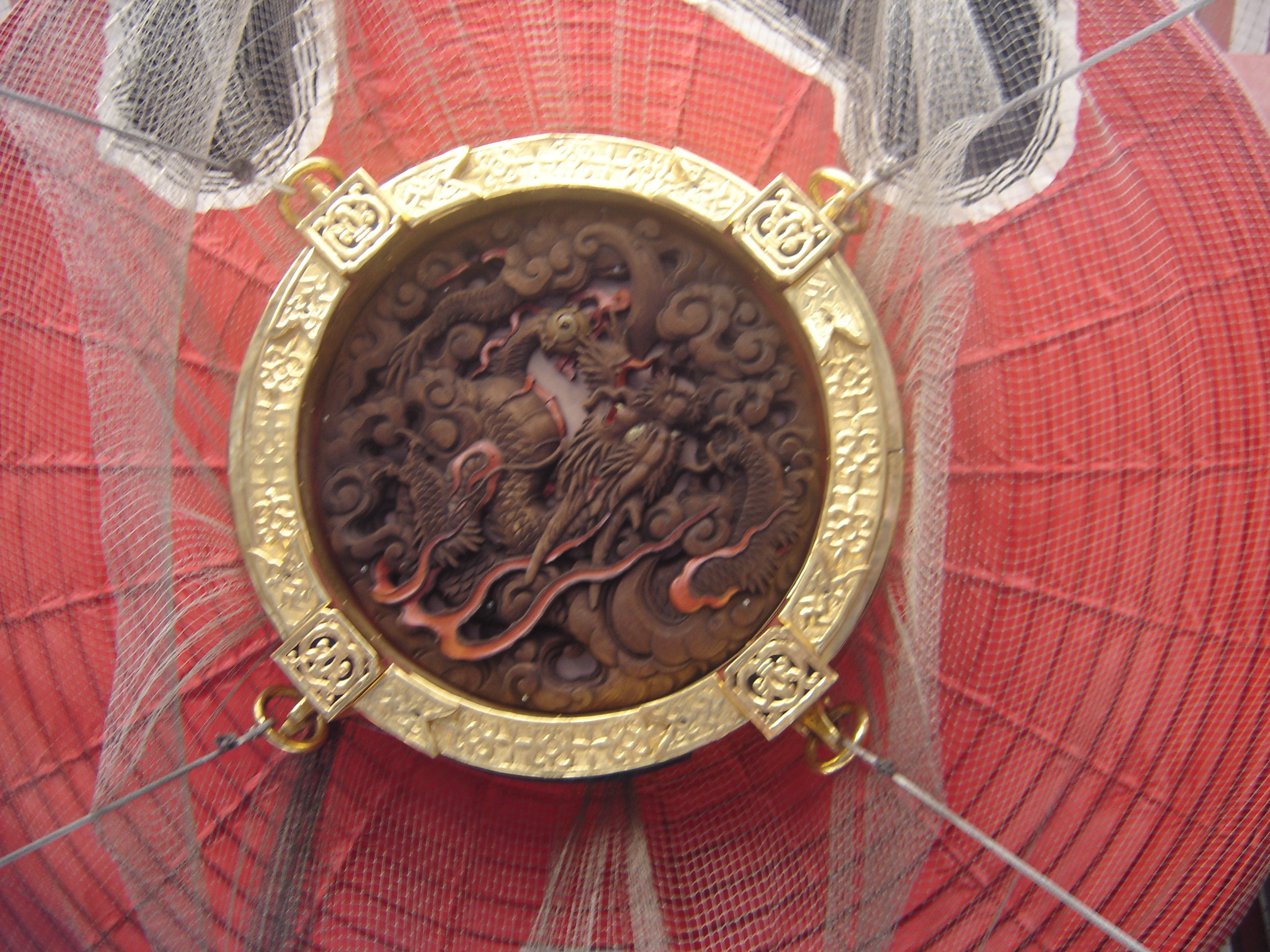
The wooden carving of a dragon on the bottom of the great red lantern on the Kaminarimon

Four statues are housed in the Kaminarimon, two in the front alcoves and two on the other side. On the front of the gate, the statues of the Shinto gods Fūjin and Raijin are displayed. Fūjin, the god of wind, is located on the east side of the gate, while Raijin, the god of thunder, is located on the west side. The original sculptures were severely damaged in the fire of 1865, with only the heads being saved, and the statues restored for the gate's 1960 reconstruction.

Two additional statues stand on the reverse of the gate: the Buddhist god Tenryū on the east, and the goddess Kinryū on the west side. These were donated in 1978 to commemorate the 1350th anniversary of the first appearance of the bodhisattva Kannon (Avalokiteśvara) at Asakusa, which led to the founding of Sensō-ji. The statues were carved by then-106-year-old master sculptor Hirakushi Denchū.

A giant red lantern (chōchin) hangs under the center of the gate. It is 3.9 metres (13 ft) tall, 3.3 metres (11 ft) wide and weighs approximately 700 kilograms (1,500 lb). The current lantern, the fifth iteration, was built by Takahashi Chōchin K.K in 2013 and has the same metallic base on the bottom as the previous lantern. The base has a name plate that says "Matsushita Denki", an abbreviated form of Panasonic's old Japanese name, Matsushita Denki Sangyo Kabushiki Gaisha. The front of the lantern displays the gate's name, Kaminarimon (雷門). Painted on the back is the gate's official name, Fūraijinmon (風雷神門). During festivals such as Sanja Matsuri, the lantern is collapsed to let tall objects pass through the gate.

The characters 金龍山 (Kinryū-zan) on the tablet above the lantern read from right to left and reference the Sensō-ji.

=== Hōzōmon ===
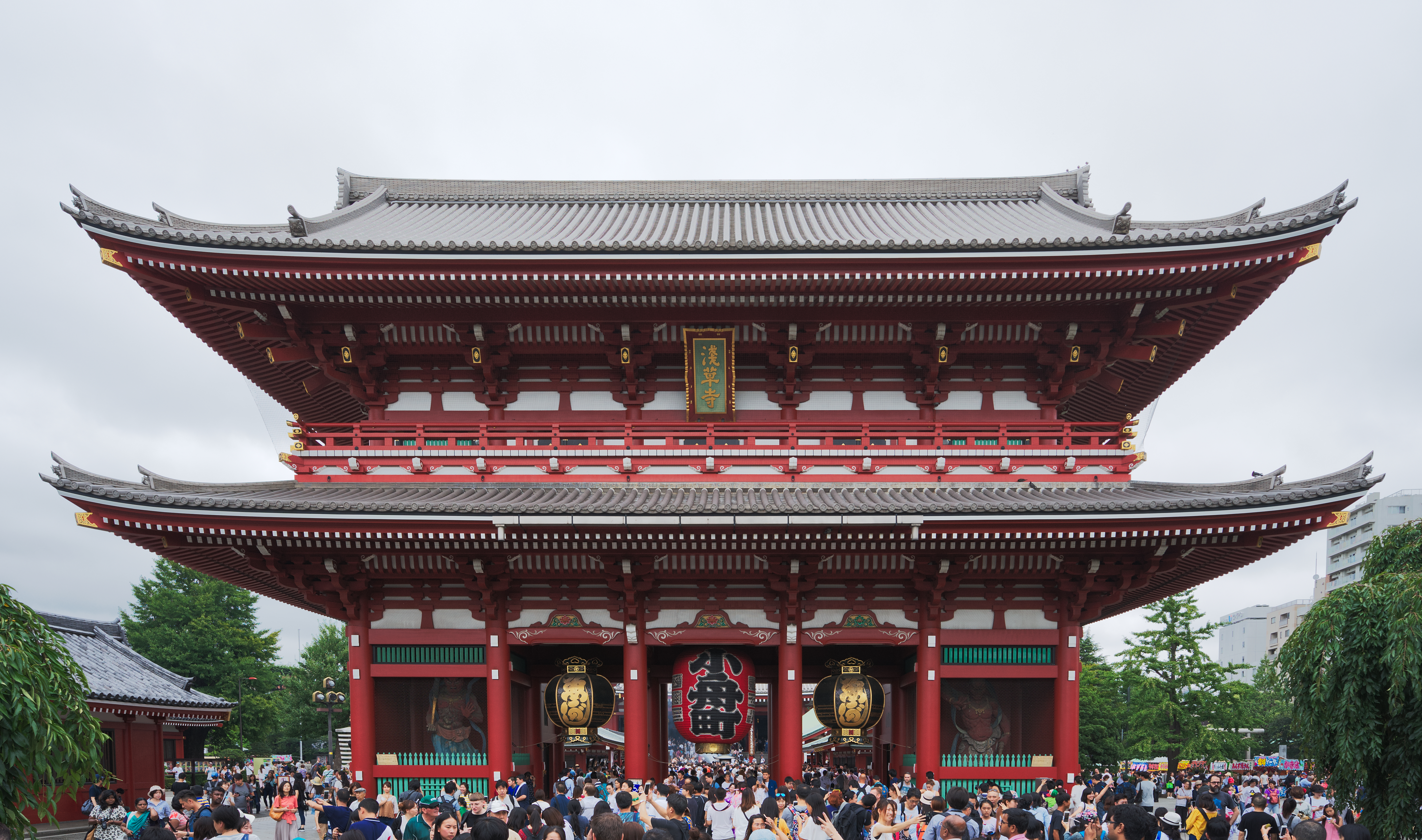
The south face of the Hōzōmon

The Hōzōmon (宝蔵門, "Treasure-House Gate") is the inner of two large entrance gates that lead to the Sensō-ji. It is a two-story gate (nijūmon), and its second story houses many of the Sensō-ji's treasures. The first story houses two statues, three lanterns and two large sandals. It stands 22.7 metres (74 ft) tall, 21 metres (69 ft) wide, and 8 metres (26 ft) deep.

==== History ====
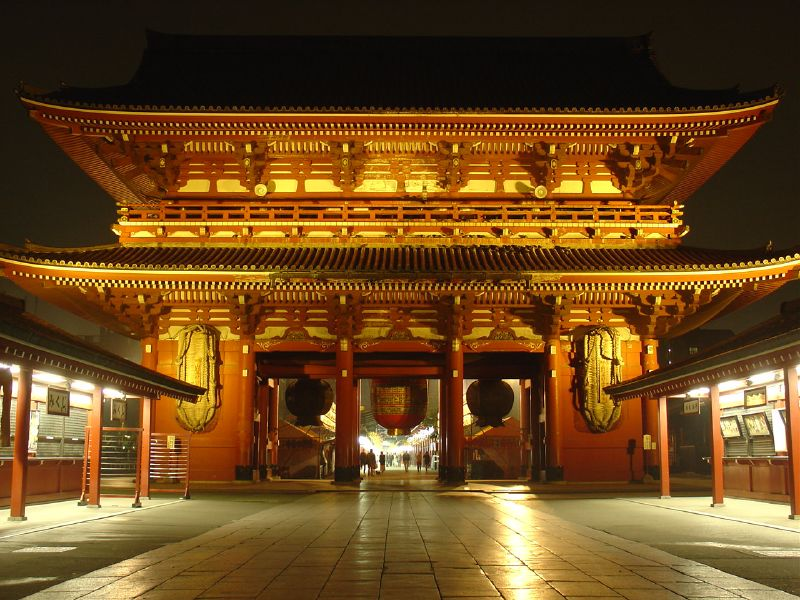
The gate's north face

The Hōzōmon was first built in 942 AD by Taira no Kinmasa. Destroyed by fire in 1631, it was rebuilt by Tokugawa Iemitsu in 1636. It stood for 300 more years until it was once again burned down during the Tokyo air raids of 1945. In 1964, the present steel-reinforced concrete structure was built with a donation of ¥150 million from Yonetarō Motoya.

Since the gate was reconstructed using flame-resistant materials, the upper story of the Hōzōmon stores the Sensō-ji's treasured sutras. These treasures include a copy of the Lotus Sutra that is designated a Japanese National Treasure and the Issai-kyō, a complete collection of Buddhist scriptures that has been designated an Important Cultural Property.

==== Features ====
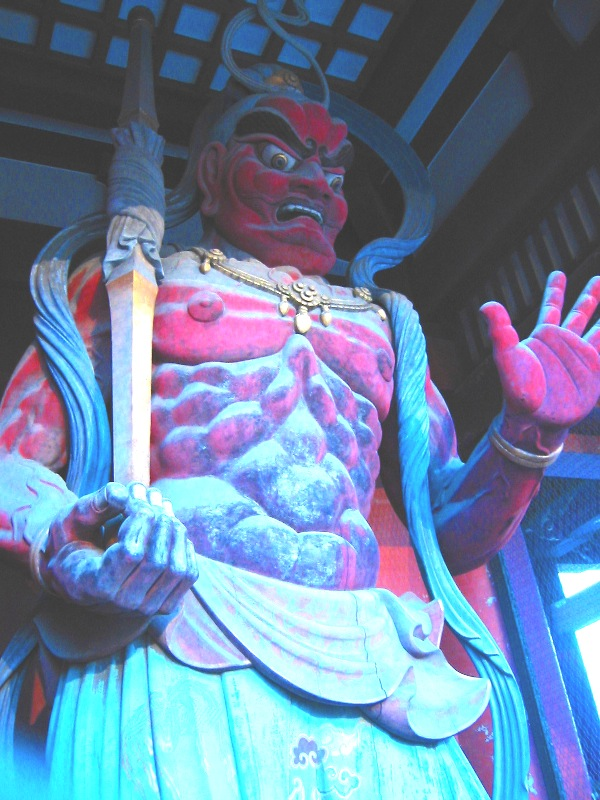
One of the Niō statues that stand on either side of the gate's south face

Unlike the Kaminarimon, which houses four different statues, the Hōzōmon houses two guardian statues that are located on either side of the gate's south face. These 5.45 metres (17.9 ft) tall statues represent Niō, the guardian deities of the Buddha. Because of these statues, the gate was originally called the Niōmon (仁王門, "Niō Gate") before it was renamed the Hōzōmon.

The gate also features three large lanterns. The largest and most prominent lantern is a red chōchin that hangs under the center of the gate's opening. With a height of 3.75 metres (12.3 ft), a diameter of 2.7 metres (8.9 ft) and a weight of 400 kilograms (880 lb), the lantern displays the name of the town Kobunachō (小舟町). The current iteration of the lantern dates back to 2003 when ¥2 billion was donated by the people of Kobunachō. Its donation commemorated the 10th-year-anniversary of the start of the Edo period. On either side of the chōchin hangs five 2.75 metres (9.0 ft) tall copper tōrō weighing approximately 1,000 kilograms (2,200 lb) each. All three lanterns are completely removed during festivals such as Sanja Matsuri.

On the Hōzōmon's east (back) face are the waraji, two 4.5 metres (15 ft) long, 1.5 metres (4.9 ft) wide straw sandals that weigh 400 kilograms (880 lb) each.

== Nakamise-dōri ==
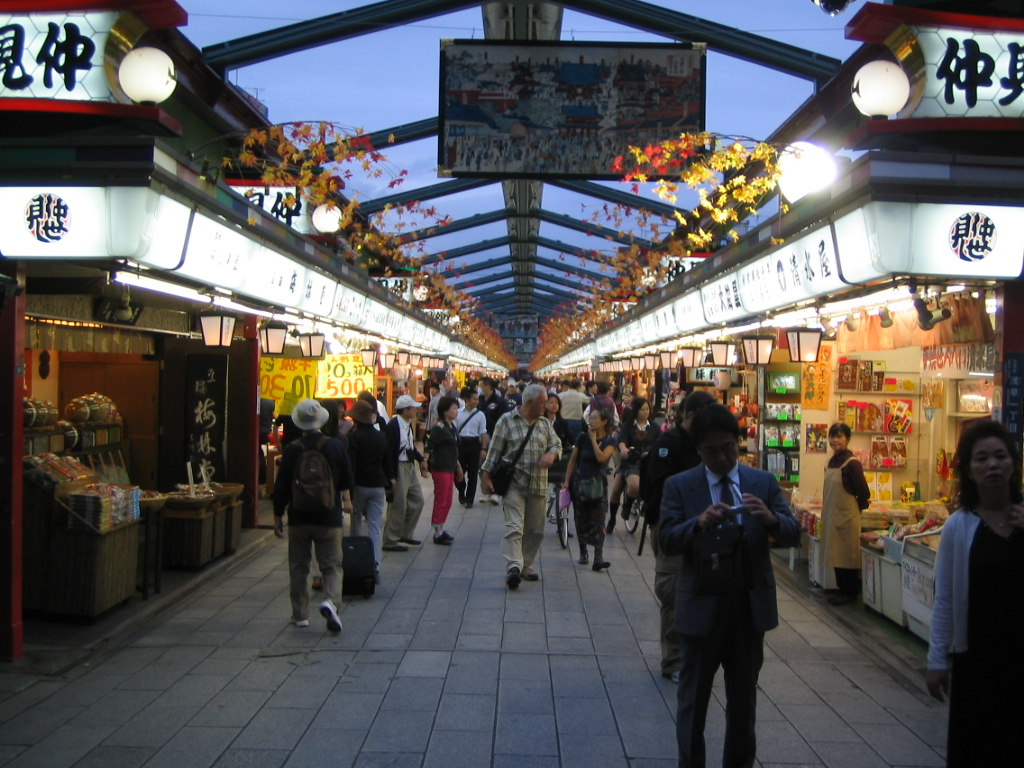
Nakamise-dōri at night

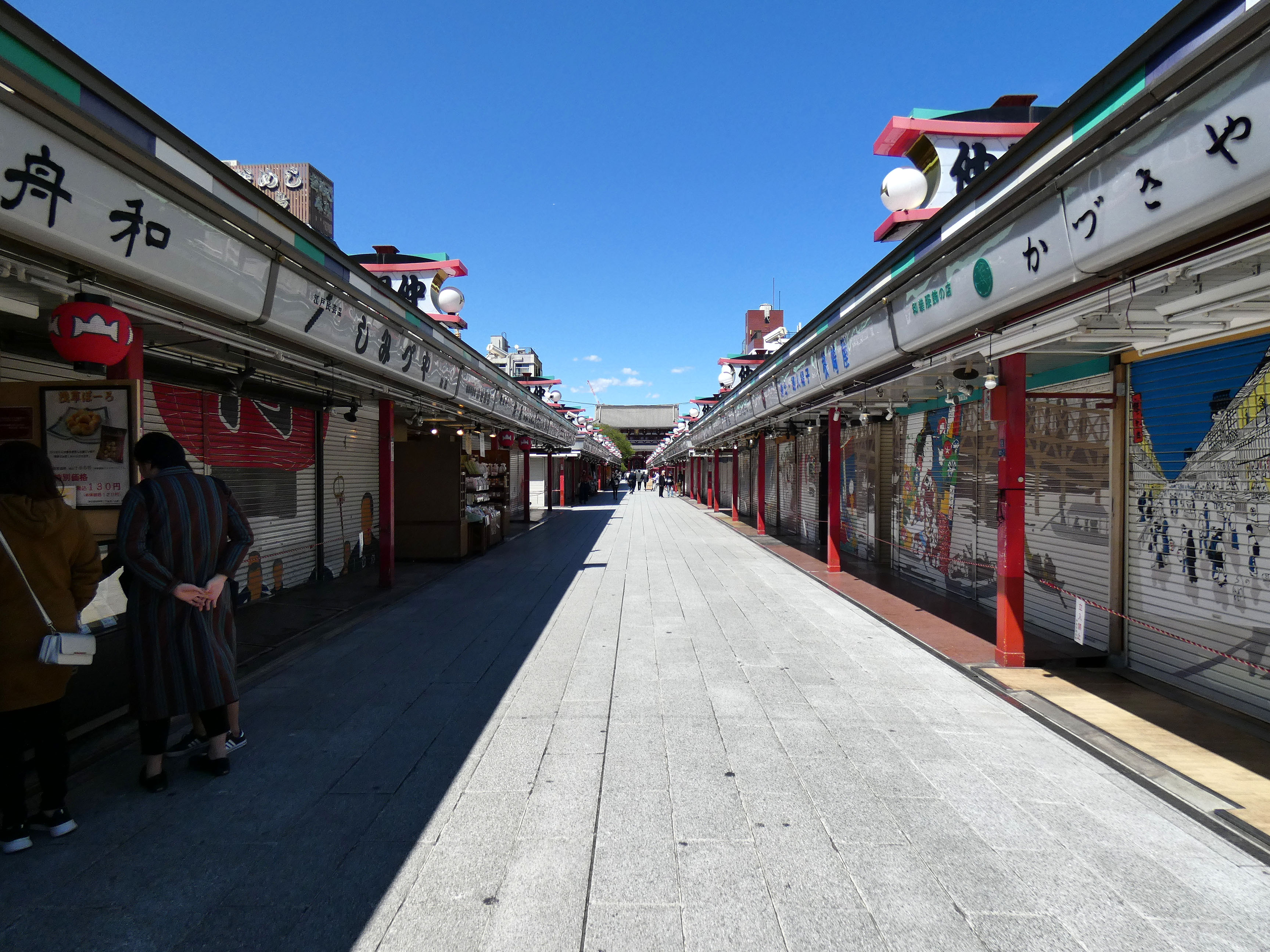
Nakamise-dōri under the state of emergency for coronavirus pandemic in 2020

The Nakamise-dōri (仲見世通り) is a street that forms the approach to the temple. It is said to have been built in the early 12th century, when neighbors of Sensō-ji were granted permission to set up shops on the approach to the temple. However, in May 1885 the government of Tokyo ordered all shop owners to leave. That December the area was reconstructed in Western-style brick. During the 1923 Great Kantō earthquake many of the shops were destroyed, then rebuilt in 1925 using concrete, only to be destroyed again during the bombings of World War II. The street is approximately 250 metres (820 ft) long and contains around 72 shops.

=== Famous Street Foods ===
==== Ningyōyaki ====
Ningyōyaki is a Japanese confection made by baking a castella-style batter filled with sweet bean paste or other fillings. The treats are in various shapes such as pagodas, the temple gate, pigeons, and local gods. While most ningyōyaki are filled with koshi-an (smooth red bean paste), some contain ogura-an (coarse red bean paste), and others are sold without any filling at all. Some of the unfilled varieties are known as “castella-yaki”. There are also varieties filled with matcha paste, sakura-flavored paste, or custard cream.

== Gallery ==
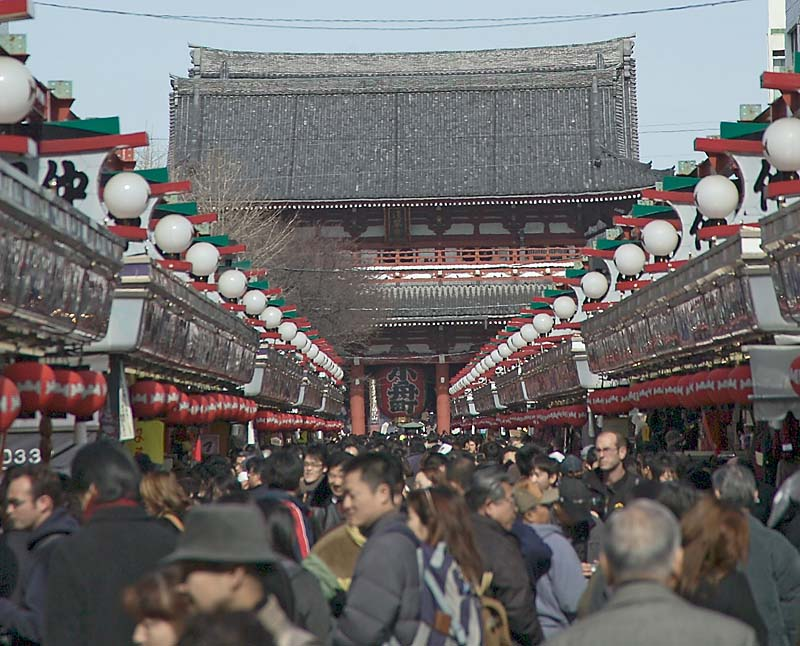
Pilgrims and tourists flocking to Sensō-ji have shopped at the small stores here for centuries.

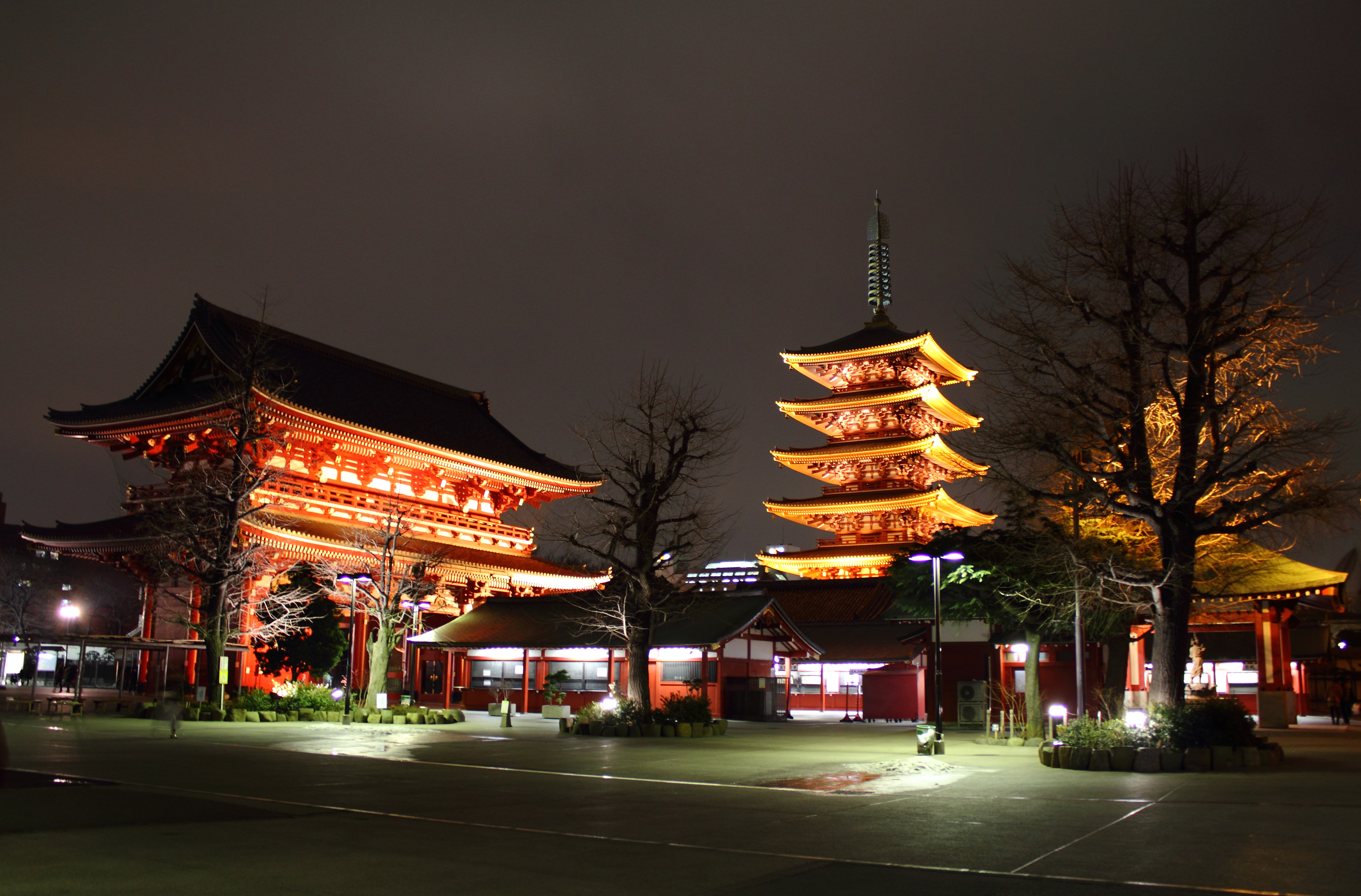
The temple during nighttime

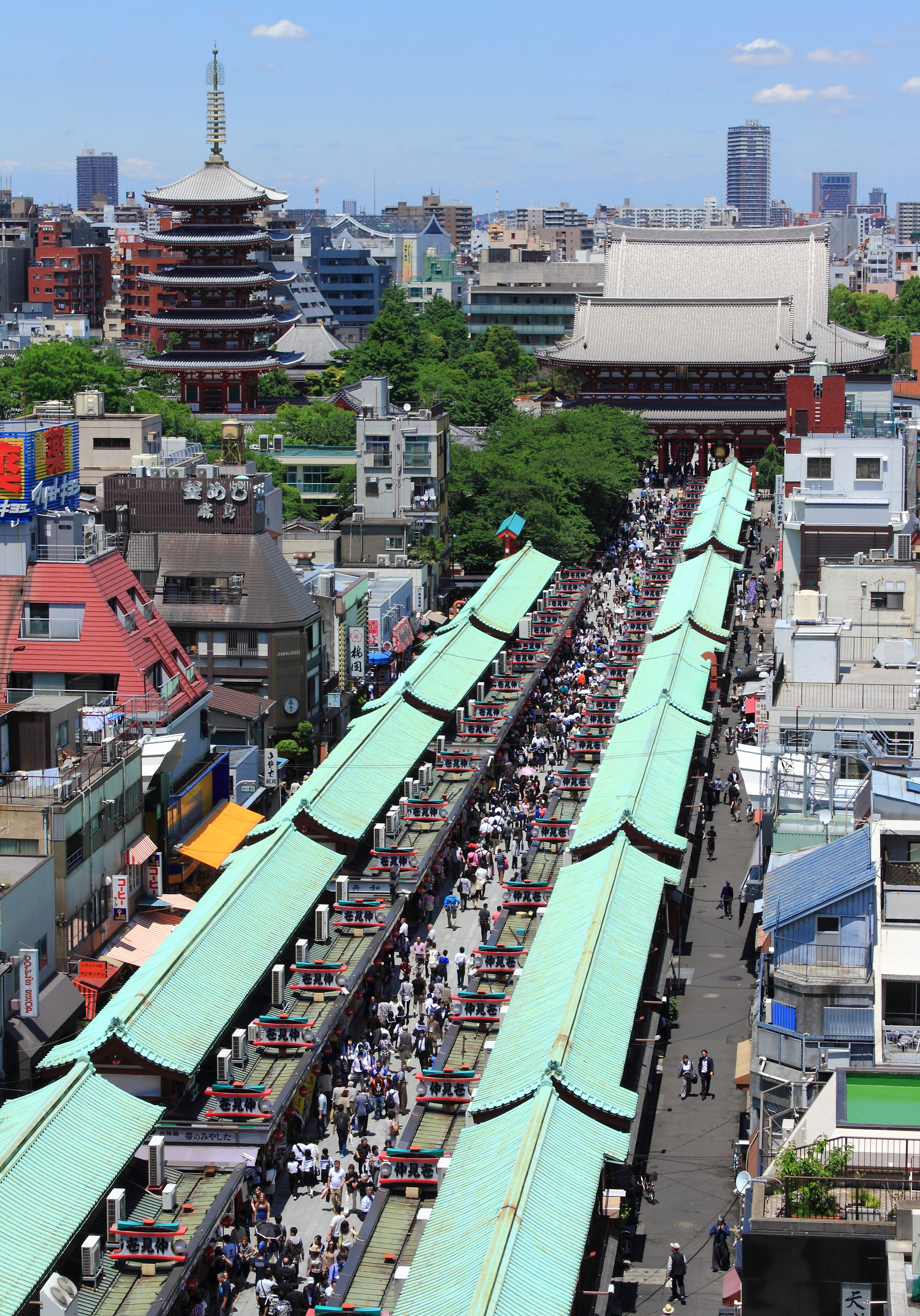
The green-roofed shops of Nakamise-dōri leading to the temple

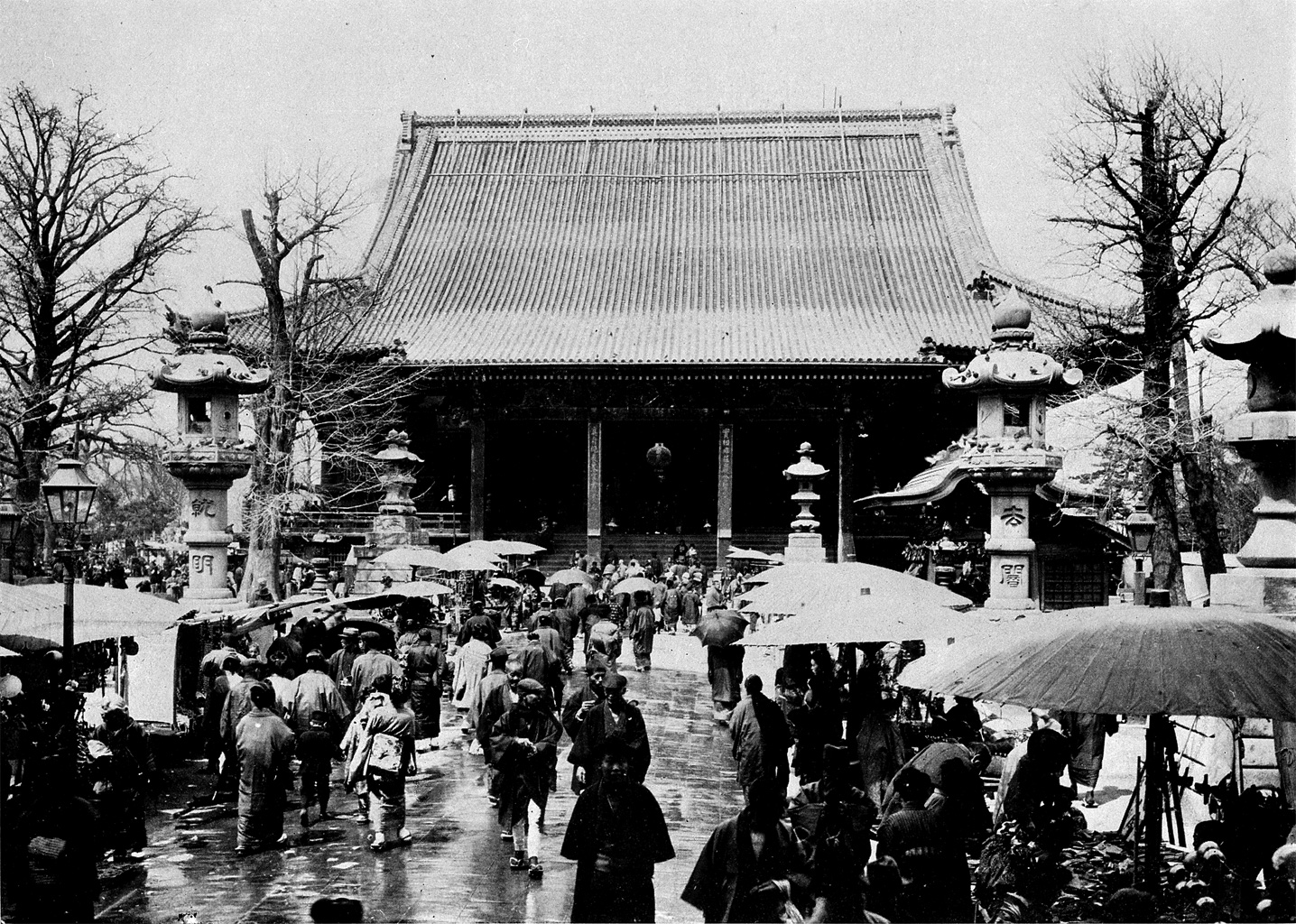
1910

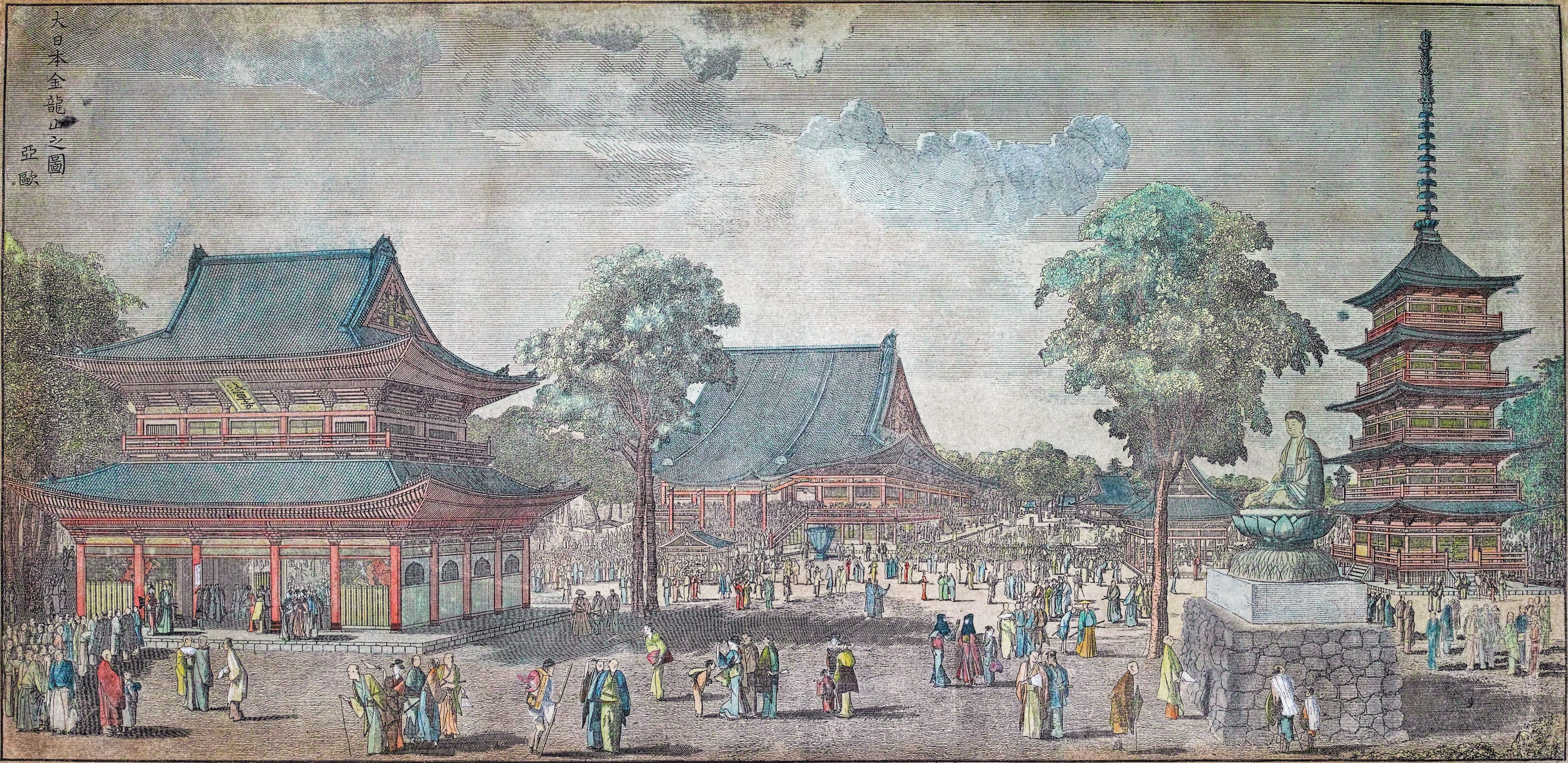
painting by Aōdō Denzen in 1809

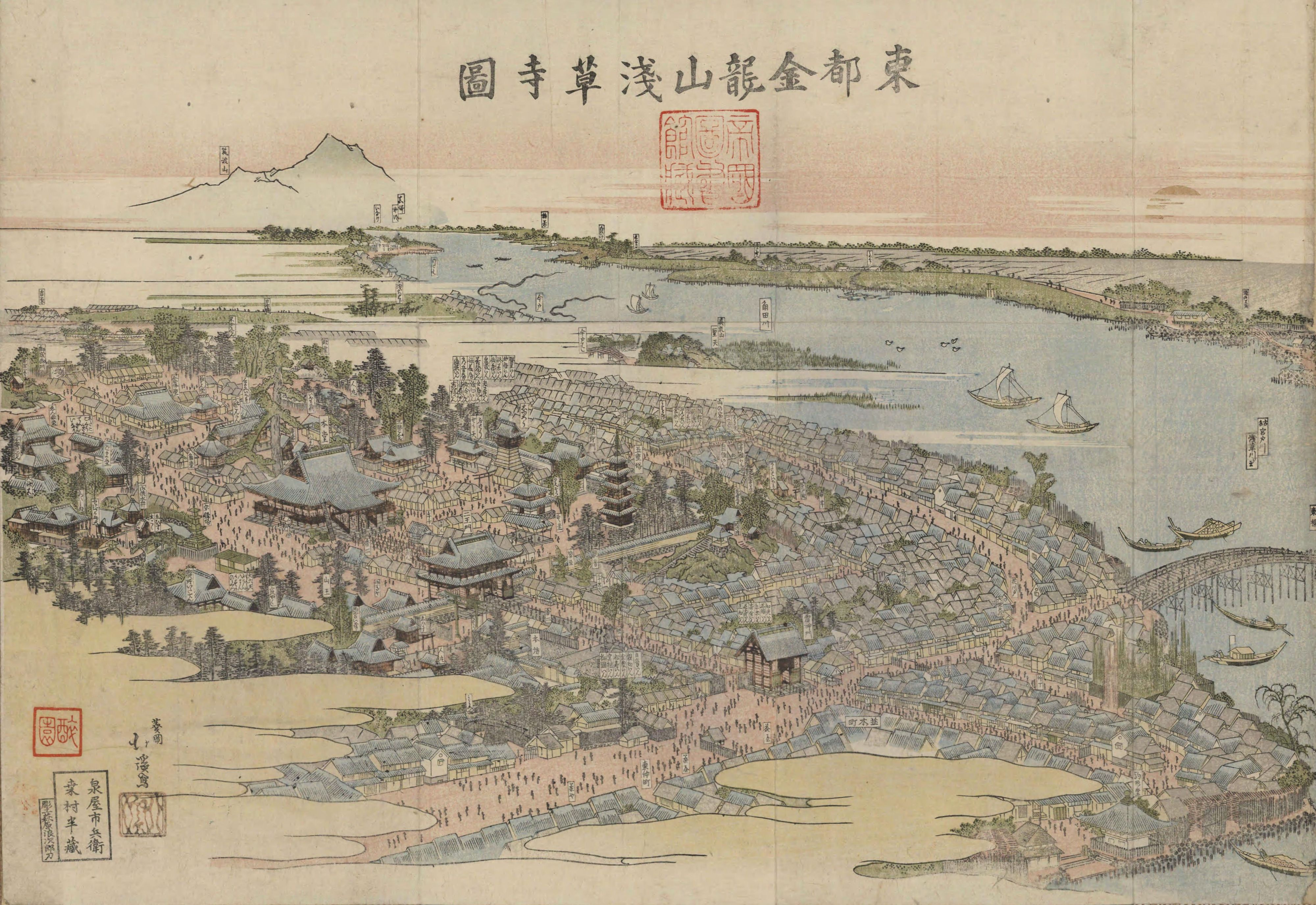
1820

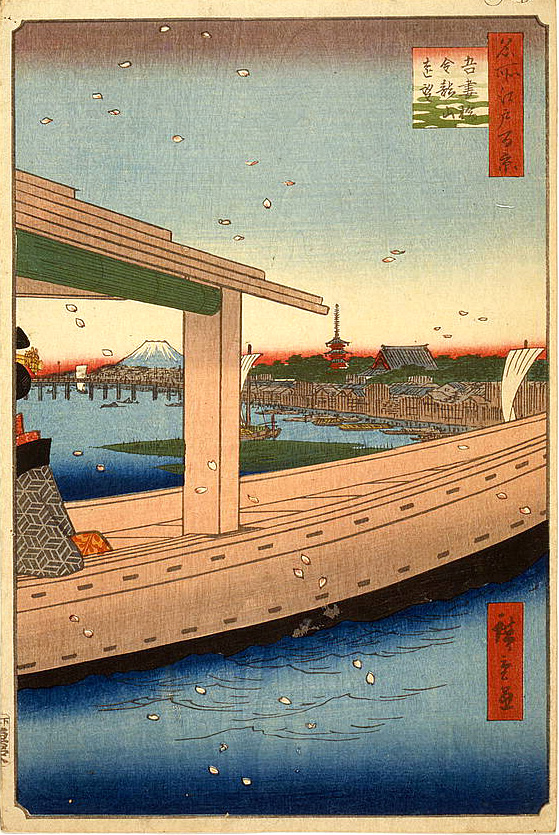
Hiroshige

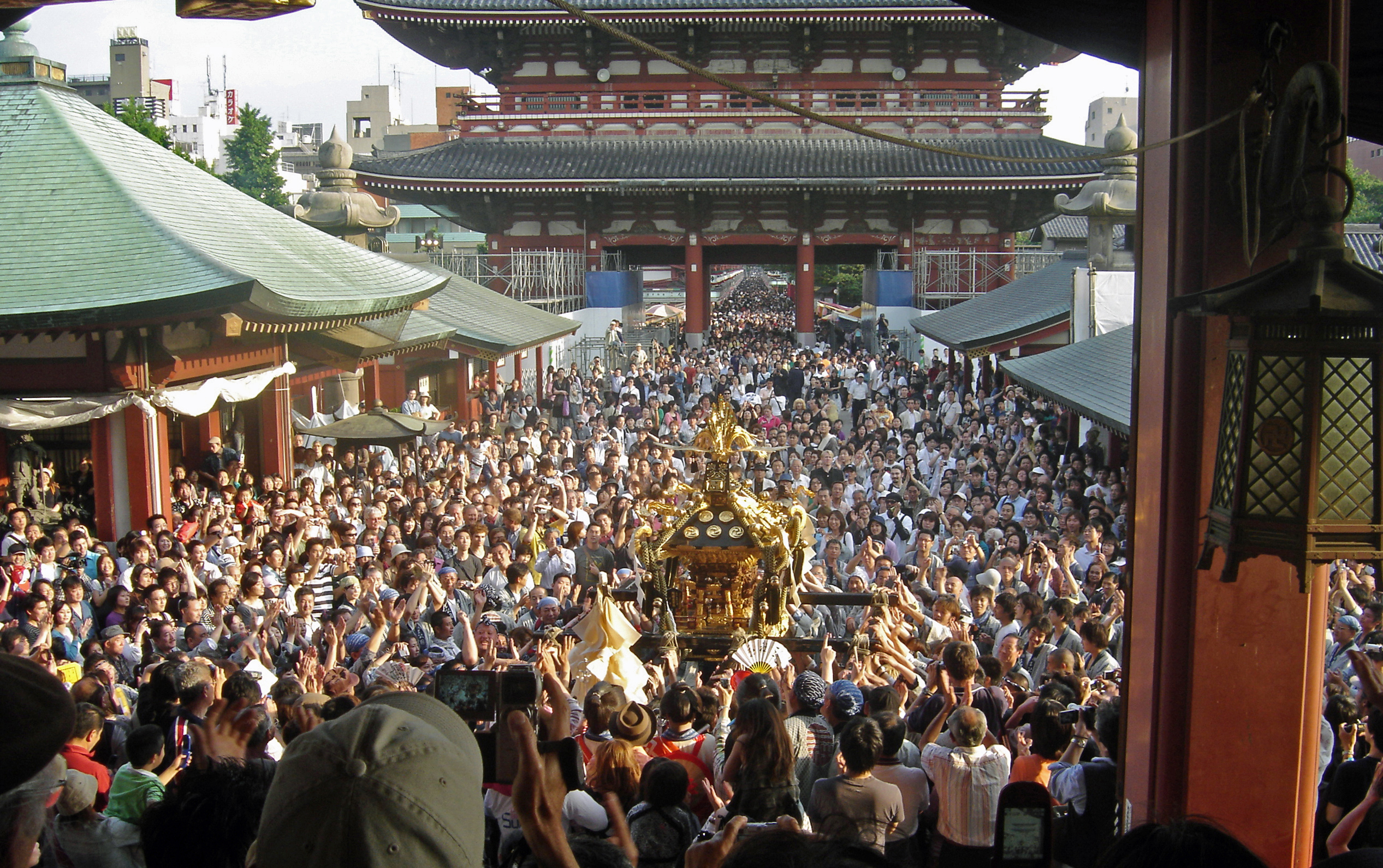
Sanja Matsuri

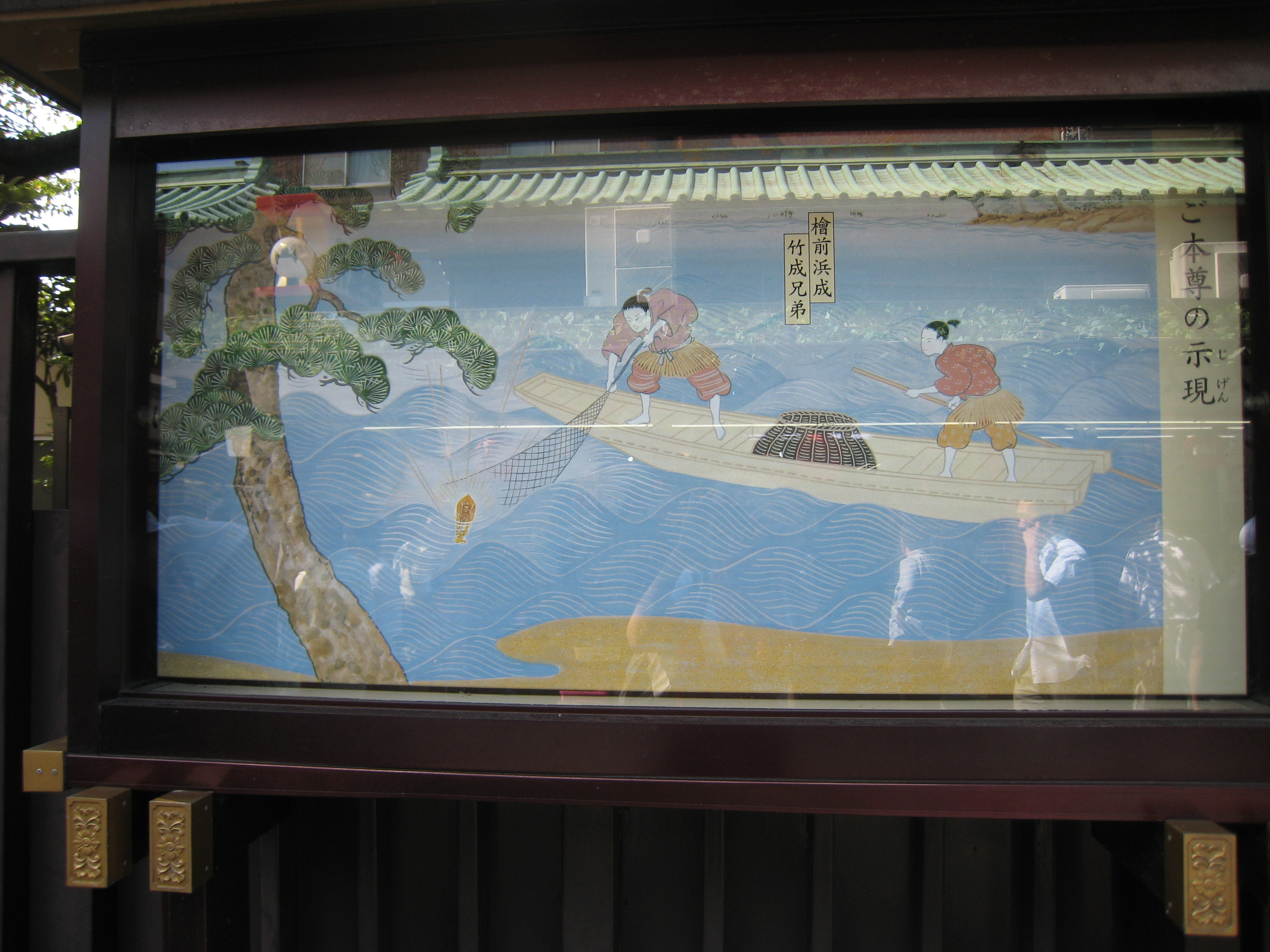
An illustration window in Sensoji of how the two fishermen brothers find bosatsu Kannon statuette in Sumida River

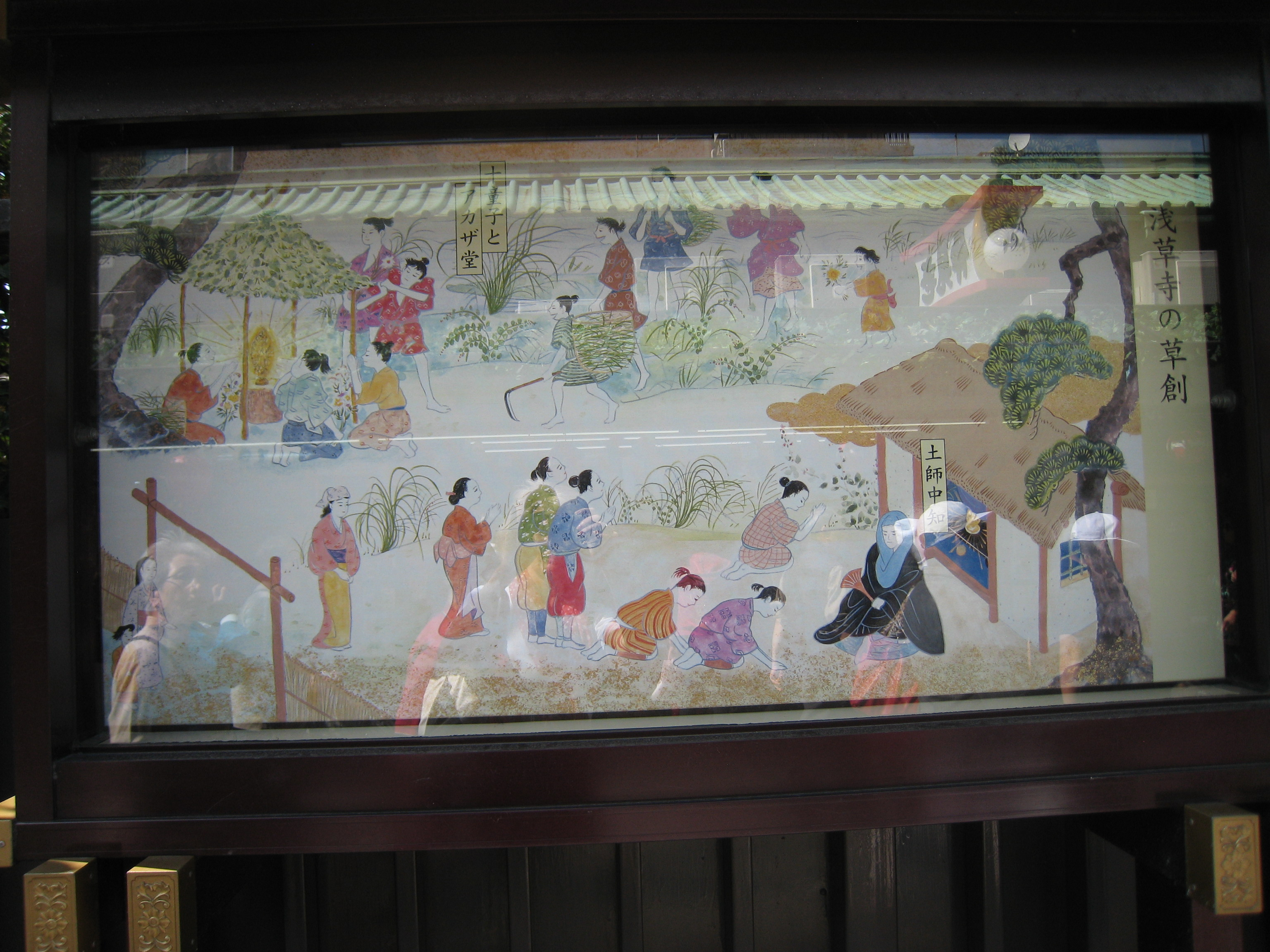
An illustration window in Sensoji of bosatsu Kannon consecrated and worshiped in early Senso-ji and Asakusa Shrine

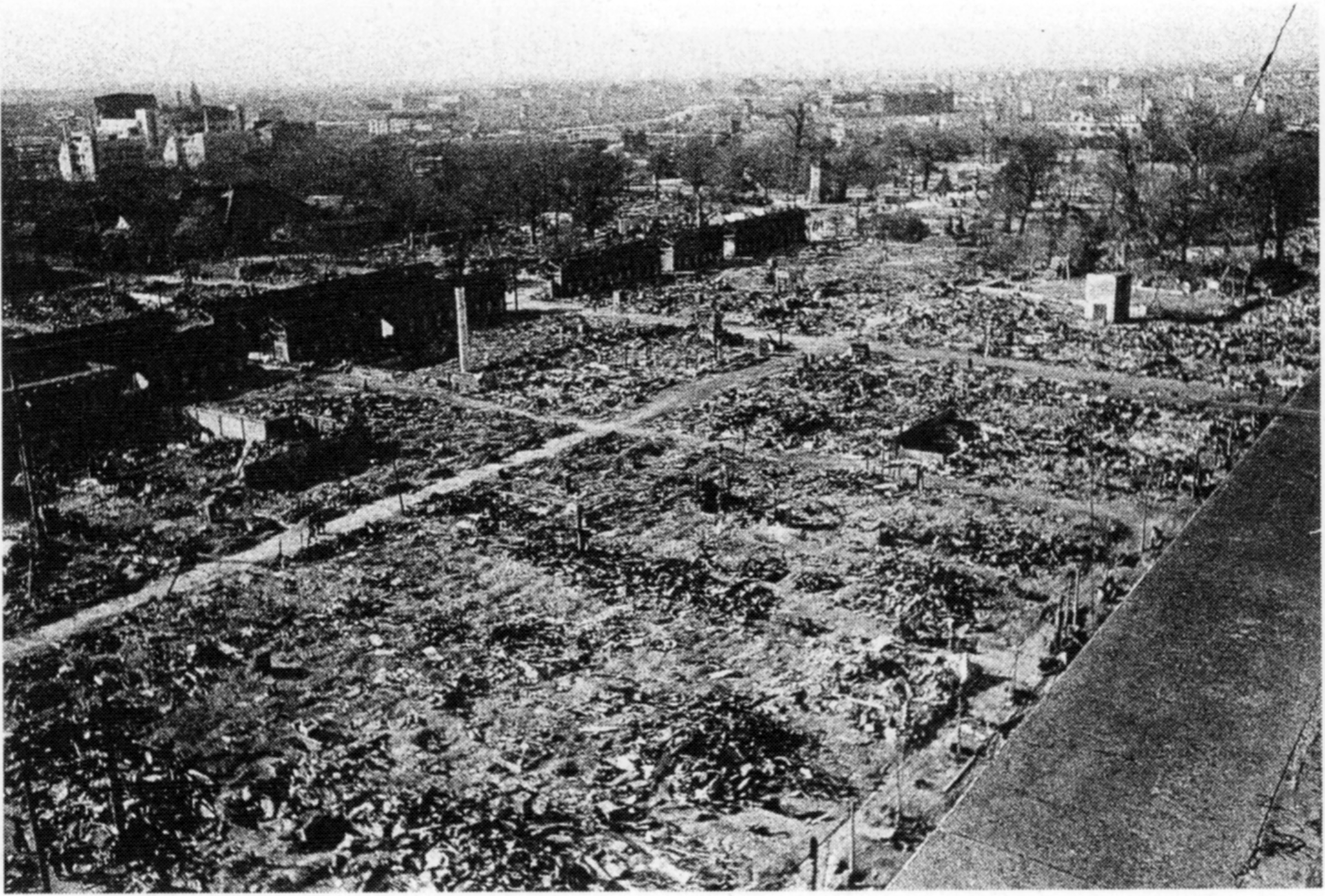
Nakamise-Dori after the American bombings of 1945

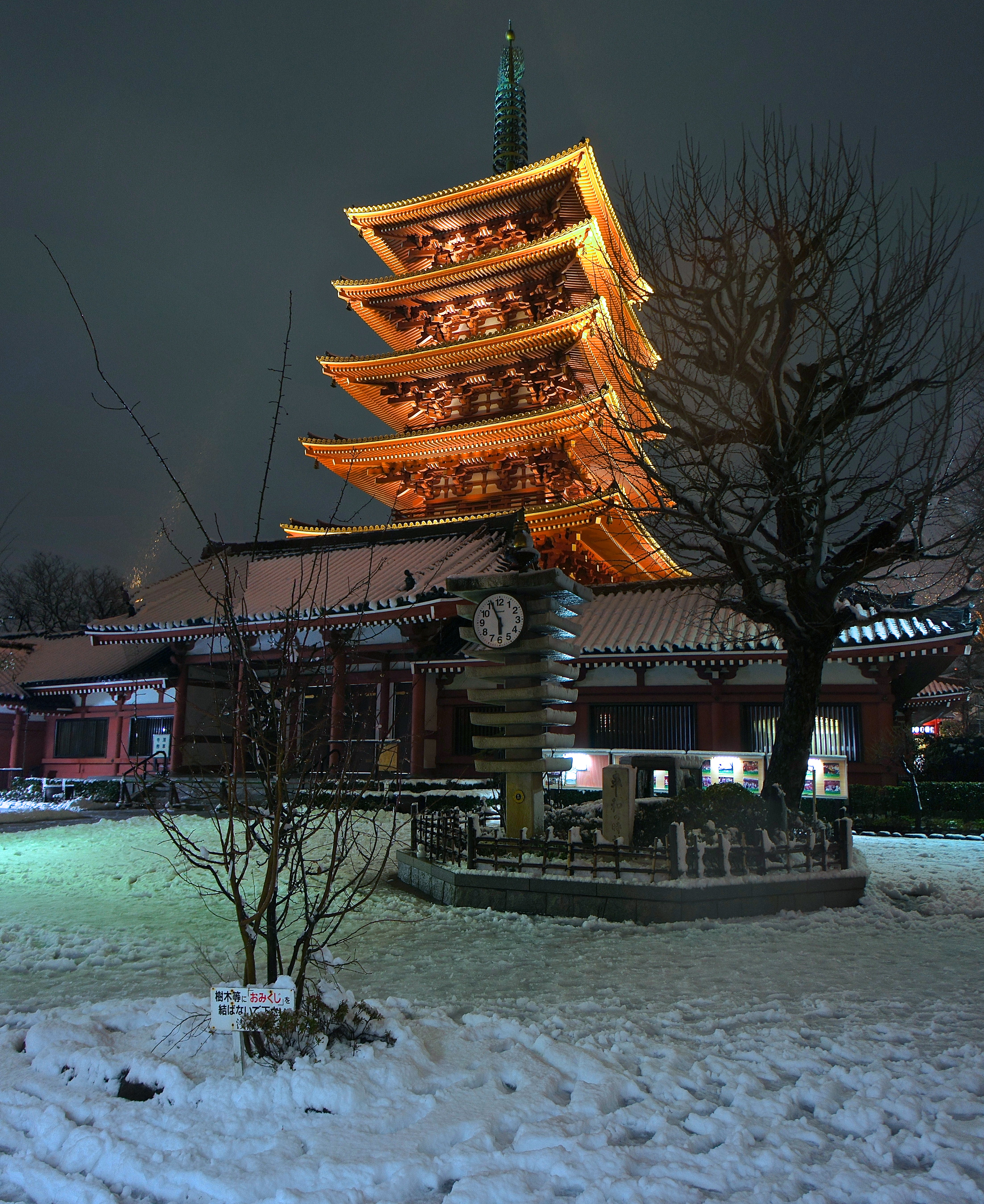
Snowfall at Asakusa Sensoji

== Cultural Properties ==
=== National Treasure ===
- Hokke-kyo sutras (法華経), Heian period, set of 10 scrolls dating to the 11th century. Also known as the "Sensoji Sutra." A masterpiece of decorative sutras, decorated with gold and silver paint, all 10 volumes remain intact, including the eight volumes of the Lotus Sutra and the open and closed sutras, the Muryogikyo and the Fugenkyo. All covers, scrolls, and strings remain intact, in their original condition. On loan to the Tokyo National Museum.

=== National Important Cultural Properties ===
- Nitenmon Gate (二天門), Edo period (1649).
- Denpo-in complex (浅草寺伝法院), Edo period (1776).
- Daizokyo sutras (大蔵経), Yuan dynasty, set of 5428 scrolls, formerly held by Tsurugaoka Hachiman-gu in Kamakura.

=== National Place of Scenic Beauty ===
- Denpo-in gardens (伝法院庭園), Edo period (1776).

== See also ==
- Buddhist temples in Japan
- Glossary of Japanese Buddhism
- List of Buddhist temples
- List of National Treasures of Japan (writings)
- List of Places of Scenic Beauty of Japan (Tokyo)
