= Kappa (folklore) =

Japanese mythical creature

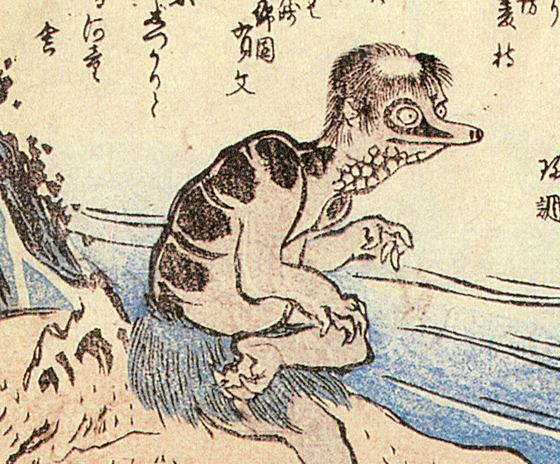
A kappa in ukiyo-e art. —Kyōka Hyaku Monogatari (1853).

In Japanese folklore, the kappa (河童; "river-child") is a familiar type of water monster, considered one of three major yōkai. (Note: Alongside the oni and tengu.) Kappa are said to be inhabiting the ponds and rivers of Japan. It is also known by various local names, including kawatarō (川太郎; "river-boy").

The kappa had been dangerous mankillers that drowned people, also targeting horses and cattle to be dragged into water. Later, they came to be depicted as mischievous beings which get punished (captured, having its arm severed, etc.), and in exchange of forgiveness, gratefully performed labor, or revealed a secret medicinal recipe (kappa's wonder drug).

Accounts typically depict them as green, slimy (or scaly), human-like beings with webbed hands and feet and turtle-like carapaces on their backs. A depression on the head, called a "dish" (sara), retains water, (Note: Cf. also de Garis & Sakai (2009), Papp (2010), and Hirota (2021), p. 321.) and if this receptacle is damaged or if its liquid is spilled or dried, a kappa becomes severely weakened. The kappa favor cucumbers and love to engage in sumo-wrestling. They are often accused of assaulting humans in water and removing a mythical organ called the shirikodama (lit. "buttocks-wee-ball") from their victim's anus.

== Nomenclature ==
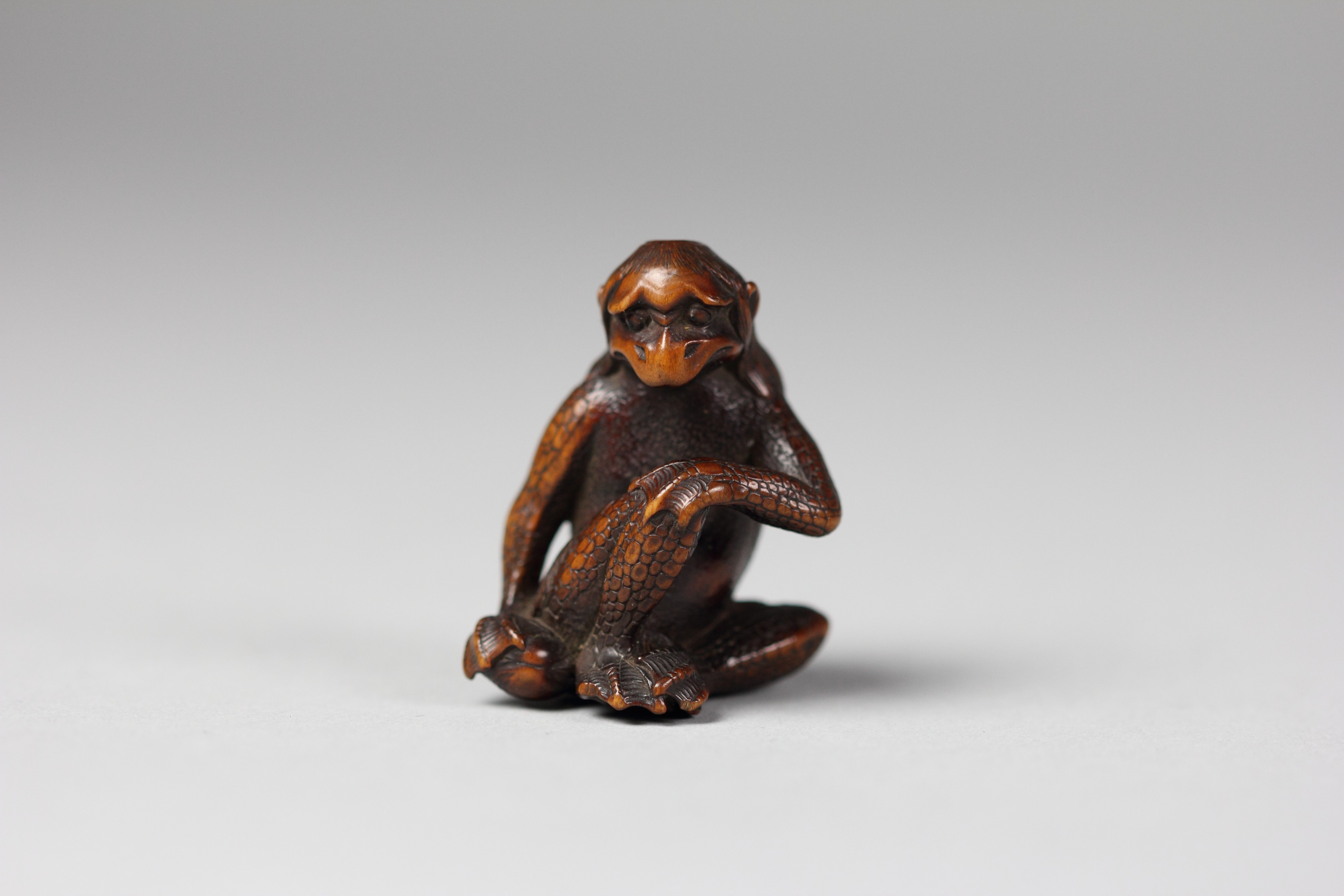
Netsuke of a kappa

The name kappa is a contraction of the compound kawawappa from kawa "river" and wappa "child, boy", or of kawawarawa, from warawa (=warabe, "child"). (Note: While kappa is standardly represented as 河童, the form 川童 is used by Kunio Yanagita in Yōkai dangi.) Another translation of kappa is "water-sprite".

In earlier times, there was a clearer demarcation in terminology, where the creature tended to be known as kappa in the east (Note: Edo (now Tokyo) or Sendai Domain (Miyagi Prefecture).) and known rather as kawatarō in the west (Kyūshū and Kansai region) from 18th-century literature. (Note: Terashima Ryōan (1712) Wakan sansai zue ("Sino-Japanese illustrations of the three realms") s.v. "Kawatarō 川太郎". Partly quoted in English (the work designated as Three Realms) in Foster (2015), pp. 159–160 and Foster (2024), p. 198) (Note: Koshigaya Gozan (1775) Butsurui Shōko 物類称呼, Book 2, "Animals 動物".) (Note: Yanagita Kunio theorized that people (in the West) began to shun the use of the name kawatarō to refer to the monster due to the appearance of the human character Kawatarō in the popular novel Tōkaidōchū hizakurige (volume 8, Bunka 6/1809), because he was a real-life grandiose merchant of Osaka otherwise known as Kawachiya Tarobē (or Tarobei).)

The kappa are also known regionally by at least eighty other names. Among older literature, the Butsurui shōko (1775) lists several local names such as gawara in Etchū Province (Toyama Prefecture). Ono Ranzan's Honzōkōmoku keimō (1803) also listed about 20 local names.

Alternate names close to the standard include: (Note: In the following parenthesized place names, the old province names are replaced by current prefecture names.) kawarō (カワロウ/川童/かはらう) or kawarō (川朗/かはらう); kawappa (Kyūshū , Niigata incl. Sado Island); kawako (cf. infra.); kawatarō; gawappa; kawawappa (Yamanashi); garappa (Kumamoto, Miyazaki, Kagoshima incl. Tanegashima); (Note: Makanda 馬関田, Nishimorokata District, Miyazaki; former Sendai, Kagoshima (now Satsumasendai, Kagoshima] and in the neighboring area of Yatsushiro city or Ashikita District, Kumamoto, etc.,) (Note: In Yatsushiro city, at the mouth of the Kuma River is the monument Kappa torai no hi (河童渡来之碑; "mounument of the arrival of the kappa"), commonly known as Garappa ishi (ガラッパ石; "garappa stone"). Yatsushiro city also holds the Oreoredēraita River Festival, and in the area, the creature is called garappa, kawappa, kawantaro, etc. The monument is also tied to the legend of the Kusenbō (九千坊) (cf. § Kyūshū region.) kawara (Fukui, SW Hyōgo, Kagawa); Kawako daimyōjin (川子大明神) (Shimane); kawakoboshi (カワコボシ/川小法師) (Yamada quarters in the city of Ise, Mie); kawarakozō (カワラコゾウ/河原小僧) (Shiroko quarters in Suzuka, Mie); kawa no tono (カワノトノ/ 川の殿) (Kyūshū, Kansai region, Sado Island (Note: In Kurume city, Fukuoka, styled kawatono (川殿).)); kawawarō (Fukuoka).

The form kawako (カワコ/川子; lit. "river child") occurs widely in the Chūgoku region and perimeter of the Seto Inland Sea (e.g., Kasaoka, Okayama), but it is often heard pronounced as kōgo. (Note: Also listed by Foster) The form kawako has also been used in Izumo Province (Shimane Prefecture) and recorded by Lafcadio Hearn who was based in that area.

The form gatarō used in Fukusaki according to Kunio Yanagita's memory from his birthplace (cf. § Gatarō of Fukusaki). He also heard from an acquaintance that the local name was kamuro, kawakamuro in Akashi not far from hometown, and spent a lifetime trying to corroborate it, but to no avail.

In Tosa Province (Kōchi Prefecture), it has been called gatarō, kadarō, (Note: In the older hiragana represented as ぐはたらう, かだらう.) or kataro.

The alternate name suitengū (水天宮; lit. "water-heavenly-palace") (Note: Foster gives suitengu but the u needs be indicated as long vowel to avoid confusion the name means a type of watery tengu.) is localized around Kurume, Fukuoka.

The kappa was also known by simian-sounding names such as enkō (Kōchi, Ehime, SE Yamaguchi Prefecture (Note: Suō Province)) or var. enko (Matsuyama, Ehime with either of these forms found also in (Shimane, Tottori, and W Yamaguchi (Note: Nagato Province)), These name derive from 猿猴 (enkō) meaning "apes and monkeys", and in the modern age where these names are current, the local lore had reported these creature to be ape-like. Ironically it is also said that the kappa and the ape-kind are mortal enemies.

Some regions employ the term suiko with widespread examples from Tōhoku region to Kyūshū. In the local water deity worship found in Aomori Prefecture, the Suiko-sama or "Exalted Water Tiger" is the deified form of the kappa. In the Tsugaru dialect, the pronunciation of this deity is corrupted to Osshiko-sama. During the Edo Period, it was commonplace to use suiko (literally "water tiger", a semi-aquatic mythical creature in Chinese lore) as a stilted sinitic translation for kappa (cf. § Suiko as Chinese name below).

In Ehime Prefecture, the kappa is sometimes called kawauso (var. kawaso), which is usually the term for 'otter'. It is also called kawauso as well as kawako in a version of the tale from Shimane Prefecture.

In some areas, the kappa is called by the same name as the soft-shell turtle (which in standard Japanese is called suppon), namely: game (Toyama, Ishikawa, Fukuoka); dochigame (Gifu, Hokuriku region); dangame (Okayama). Thus in these places, the terrapin-based names are a giveaway that the kappa is locally considered to be very turtle-like.

The terms dochirobe, game, and dochi (var. dotsuchi) are used interchangeably in the area of Gifu, Toyama, and Ishikawa Prefectures. This dochirobe (etc.) is reputedly a red-bellied creature with lush flowing tail, but when it attains 1000 years of age transforms into a full-fledged kappa, known locally as Kārabōzu, (Note: Japanese: カーラボーズ. This appears to be a corruption of Kawara-bōzu or "riverbank boy/boy monk/baldie".) whose head resembles the reddish apish creature with a shōjō-like face and a saucer atop its head to hold water, but otherwise more or less human-shaped. (Note: Takasaki, Masahide, folklore of Toyama (city) Takasaki et al. (1928) p. 185. Bibliographical details via Data ID 2240171, The Database of Folktales of Mysterious Phenomena and Yōkai@International Research Center for Japanese Studies.) In Gifu Prefecture, their kawaranbe (genuine kappa) is distinguished from the dochi which is considered an almost-kappa. Another variant name of this group is the aforementioned dochigame (Cf. also medochi under § Similar creatures).

The kappa is also called komahiki, meaning "steed-puller", attested locally around the Matsumae region, from the kappa's reputed practice of trying to drag horses into water.

=== Similar creatures ===
Akin to the kappa are the local versions called the hyōsube in southern Kyūshū (and Saga Prefecture further north), as well as the medochi of northern Tōhoku region. The name medochi and variants (midzushi, shintsuchi, mintsuchi, dochi) are grouped together as names derving from mizuchi, a mythical water-serpent or dragon. (Note: Foster (1998), p. 2, Foster (2024), pp. 159–160 and Foster (2024), pp. 197–198 quote from the account of mizuchi in the Nihon shoki and discusses it as a primordial precursor of the kappa or a "pre-kappa".) Of these, the subtype dochi (Gifu Prefecture, etc.、CITEREFIshida2017) was already discussed above.

There are also the Wakayama Prefecture version called kashanbo and the Ibaraki Prefecture version neneko. (Note: Akamatsu Sōtan (d. 1862)'s Tonegawa zushi ("gazetteer of the Tone River", pub. 1855), Book 1 gives an illustrated account of the neneko, which Teiri Nakamura considers to be derivative, i.e., a terminal development (after multiple copying) of the kappa form which he labels A-type Fig.(u) in the work Kappa kikiawase. The original illustrations of Kappa kikiawase are not extant, but their copies are retained in Suiko kōryaku (Cf. § Iconography below).)

A seko is the winter-time transformation of the kappa according to the folklore of Kyūshū, where it is said that the creatures remove themselves into the mountains during the cold climate and returning to the rivers in the spring (Cf. § Wintering in the mountains). The kenmun (kenmon) of the Amami Islands also exhibits this wintering behavior, and in the illustrated commentary of the creature in the Nantō zatsuwa, it is equated to the kawatarō and yamawaro ("mountain boy"). (Note: This work labels the creature in kanji as "水蝹" (Chinese mythical creature, discussed earlier), but depending on the manuscript, its reading in fine print (furigana) is given as kenmon.) (Note: Nantō zatsuwa, in: Tanigawa (1988). Nihon shomin seikatsu-shi shiryō shūsei 日本庶民生活史料集成, 1: 6, and Vol. 20(Supplement) where Torao Haraguchi of Kagoshima University supplies a summary.)

In Shimominochi District, Nagano, the local version of kappa is called sēshin or sējin which is apparently a corruption of suijin ("water deity").

== Appearance and traits ==
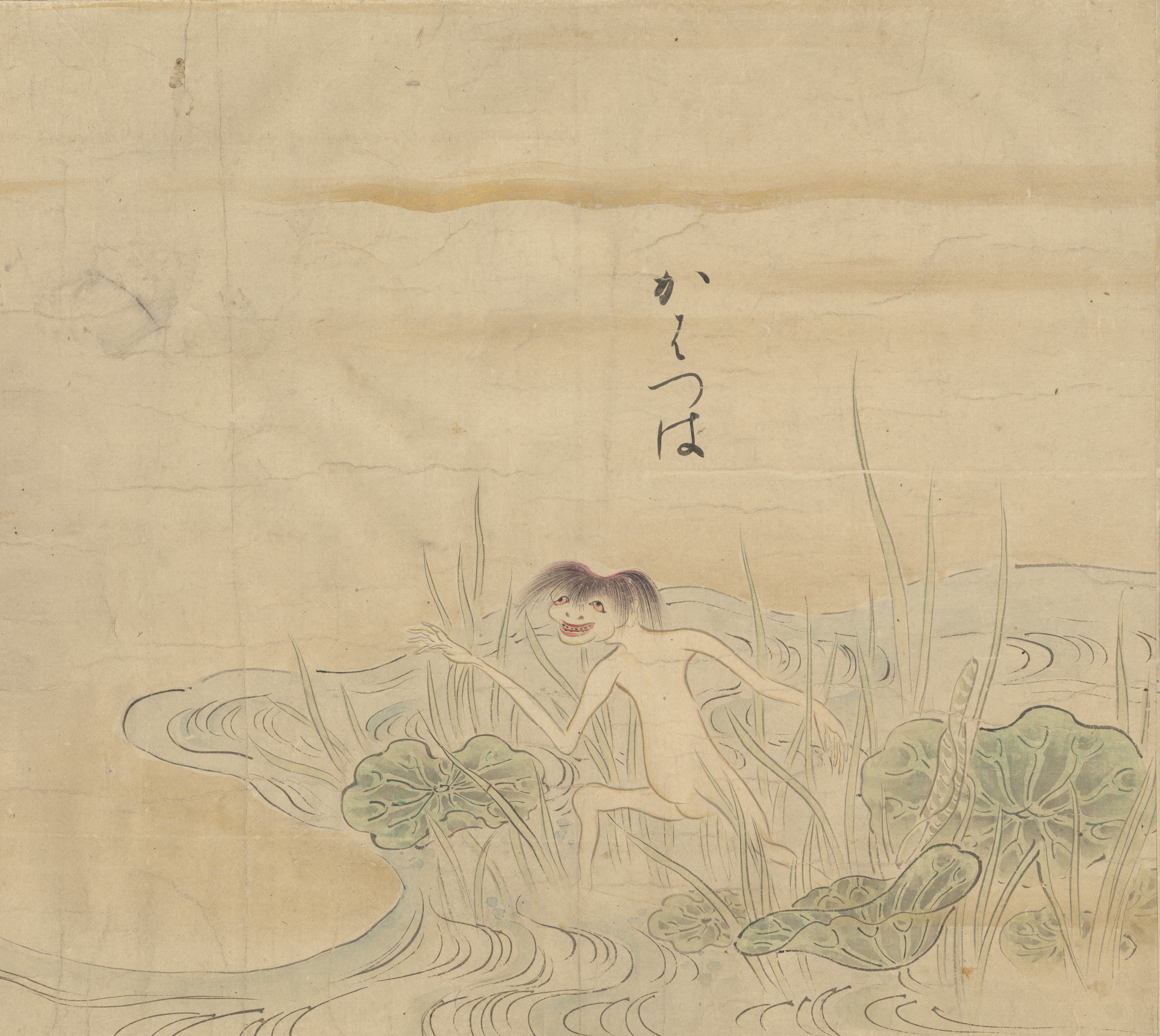
Kappa (かはつは) from Bakemono no e (c. 1700), Harry F. Bruning Collection of Japanese Books and Manuscripts, L. Tom Perry Special Collections, Harold B. Lee Library, Brigham Young University.

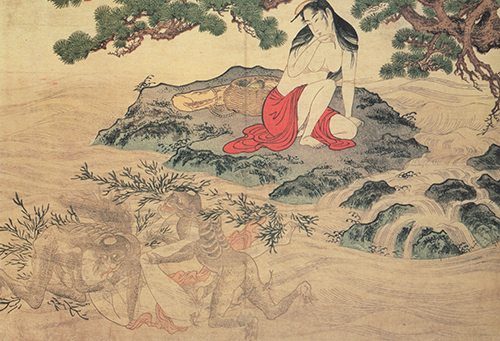
Two scaly-skinned kappa violate an ama diver underwater as her companion looks on from above. —Unsigned shunga erotic art "Abalone divers (awabi-tori)" (1788) of the Utamakura series, attrib. to Utamaro, pub. Tsutaya Jūzaburō

The currently popularized image of the kappa describes it as roughly humanoid in form and about the size of a child. (Note: Kyōgoku & Tada (2008) writes "height of about a 2, 3-year old child”as if it is toddler sized, but the 18th century Wakan sansai zue stated it the size of "about a 10 year-old", while Butsurui koshō gave it as about a 4, 5 year old.)

They are typically greenish in color (or yellow-blue/yellow-green (Note: The original source ao-kiiro (青黄色), and this could be yellow-blue, but perhaps more likely yellow-green.) or even red in some locales (Tōno, Iwate).

They often have a pointed or beaked mouth. They are also usually equipped with webbed hands and feet, and bears a turtle-like carapace on their back.

=== Head dish ===
They have an indentation (so-called "dish" or "saucer") atop their head to retain water even when they venture on land, and when the water is full, they exhibit mighty strength (at sumo wrestling, etc.), (Note: Butsurui shōko (1775):“其かたち、四、五歳ばかりの[童]（わらは）のごとく、[頭]（かしら）の毛赤うして、頂（いただき）に凹（くぼ）なる皿有り。水を[貯]（たくは）ふる時は力はなはだつよし。性相撲を好み..”) but if the water spills, the kappa is weakened, or it may even die. From around their bald depression, strands of long hair hang down.

Rōō sawa (老媼茶話; "Old Women's tea-talk", Kanpō 2/1742) is one early work that refers to the strategy of upsetting the water in the dish in order to weaken the kappa to facilitate its capture.

=== Sliminess and odor ===
Kappa are said to be slick or slimy, (though possibly scaly (Note: Scaliness is dated, as turtle-frog-like depiction eventually became prevalent.)) and smell gamy or fishy. (Note: Lore of Tokyo from the shōwa era gives namagusai (生臭い; "gamy").)

Their gaminess is referred to in Yamato honzō (pub. 1709), which states that "the gaminess saturates the nose, and trying to stab it with a wakizashi fails to hit, and since the body is covered in slime, it is difficult to capture". But even though sword cuts fail to deliver wounds to it, a sharpened hemp-shaft will penetrate it, according to the Wakun no shiori dictionary (1778–1887).

=== Joined arms ===
According to some accounts, a kappa's arms are connected to each other through the torso and can slide from one side to the other. That is to say, if one tugs on one arm, the other arm begins to shrink, and even come loose and fall straight out. (Note: According to the Wakan sansai zue ("Sino-Japanese illustrations of the three realms", 1712), also cited by Foster (1998), p. 6)

It has been conjectured that this is an introduced piece of lore taken from fabulous Chinese descriptions concerning the gibbon. (Note: "援、テナガザル、エンコウ（猿猴）を「通臂」とする" in Jūshū Honzō kōmoku keimō 重修本草綱目啓蒙 35, Supplement to Apes and Prodigies 寓類怪類附録. quoted via Koji ruien.)

=== Apish subtypes ===
As aforementioned, the ape-like form has survived in folklore into the modern age in the Chūgoku and Shikoku regions where the enkō nickname has remained current. The enkō-type kappa is based on ape, but endowed with river-dwelling characteristics; this relationship is somewhat analogous to the Kyūshū region lore of the mountain spirit (yamawaro) becoming the river-dwelling kappa, called either kawawaro or hyōsubo depending on zone (as discussed further under § Wintering in the mountains).

== Behavior ==
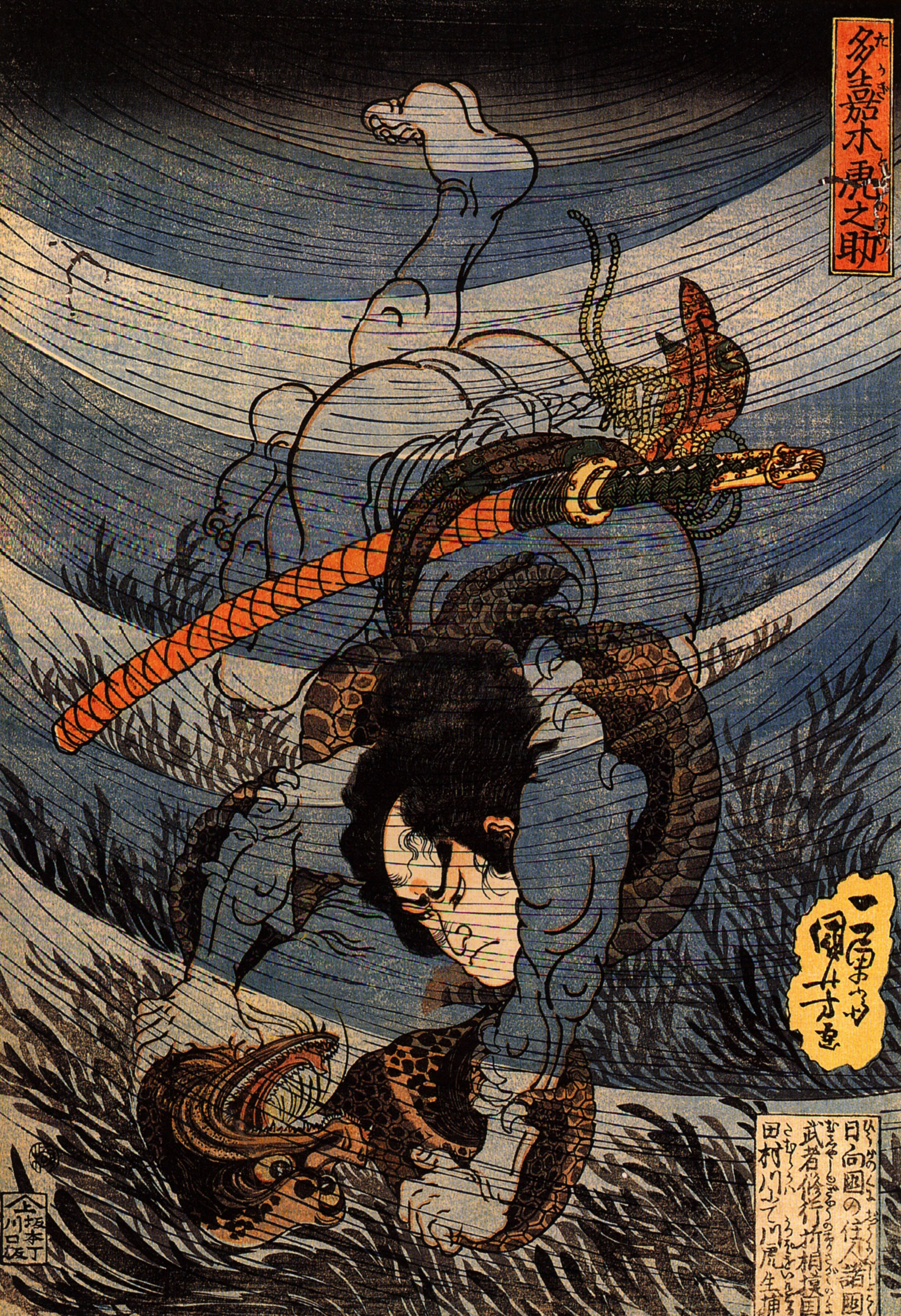
Capturing a kappa alive. Utagawa Kuniyoshi

Kappa are regarded as dwelling in some body of water, a river, pond, swamp, pool, sometimes even salt water. (Note: Nagasaki Prefecture. The kappa wife of Iki Island, The kappa maids of Hirado. The sea kappa of Tsushima Island port.) (Note: Ibaraki Prefecture. The see kappa of Hitachi Province said to be black. The kappa allegedly caught in Mito Bay in 1801 (cf. § Ibaraki Prefecture).) (Note: Hakata Bay.)

Though sometimes menacing, they may also behave amicably towards humans. Their actions range from comparatively minor misdemeanors, such as looking up women's kimono if they venture too near to water, to outright malevolence, such as drowning people and animals, kidnapping children, raping women and at times eating human flesh.

As for the menacing part, kappa have been go-to monster to be blamed for any drownings, and were often said to try to lure people into water and pull them in with their great skill at wrestling. They are sometimes said to take their victims for the purpose of drinking their blood, eating their livers, or gaining power by taking their shirikodama (尻子玉), a mythical ball said to contain the soul, which is located inside the anus. Kappa have been used to warn children of the dangers lurking in rivers and lakes.

The more sinister view of them tended to be found in older literature, e.g. Kaibara Ekken (1709), (Note: Kaibara Ekken (1709). Yamato Honzō) since gradually over the Edo Period, a more comical image of the kappa had developed. (Note: The argument that bungling mischief-makers don't pose a credible threat will be discussed shortly, below.) (Note: Whereas Foster (1998), pp. 15–16 writes of "grotesque and malicious creature of [genuine] folklore", so that his position here is that the mischief-makers of folklore are not completely benign; he argues that kawaii (cuteness) only came with the fictive folklore developed by manga artists and others, and it is only these later popularized or commercialized versions that are left with only their "benign characteristics".) According to these older writings, humans who survived the kappa could still sustain some sort of a mental aftereffect like stupor or insanity. (Note: Ekiken here prescribes grinding the bark of the shikimi plant's bark into an incense, then ingesting the ground or ashes mixed in water, but this plant is known to be toxic, especially when the seeds were passed off as star anise spice.)

Much of the known modern folklore concerning the kappa involves them bungling in their mischief and being punished, e.g., attempting a § horse-pulling or stroking the backside of someone in the toilet, and getting its hand chopped off, or being captured. In return for forgiveness, they typically disclosed the recipe to the kappa's wonder drug, or make apologetic vows of good behavior, submit a letter of apology (written oath), bring gifts of fish, or help out with work in the fields (§ Providing labor), etc. (See further under § Grateful kappa below).

Although the cliché is for the kappa to beg the return of its lost hand, there are "specimens" everywhere in Japan purporting to be the mummified hands of the kappa, including those said to have been cut off by someone long ago (cf. § Mummies). (Note: Also there are perhaps three or so purported mummies of the whole kappa.)

=== Grateful kappa ===
Once befriended, kappa may perform any number of tasks for human beings.

==== Medicine ====
Typically the kappa has its arm sliced off (by a samurai, etc.) and delivers up a wonder medicine to treat sword injuries. It may be some other treatment, e.g. for wind stroke (debility, etc. after stroke) (Ina, Nagano), or for kan no mushi (baby colic).

Tales about obtaining secret medicine from the kappa is ubiquitous throughout Japan. (Note: Search query at The Database of Folktales of Mysterious Phenomena and Yōkai@International Research Center for Japanese Studies and the "related data" apparatus can be used to find matching data, e.g., case of Futagochō 二子町, Kitakami, Iwate which a certain blog missed in finding nearly 70 cases in 24 Prefectures.)

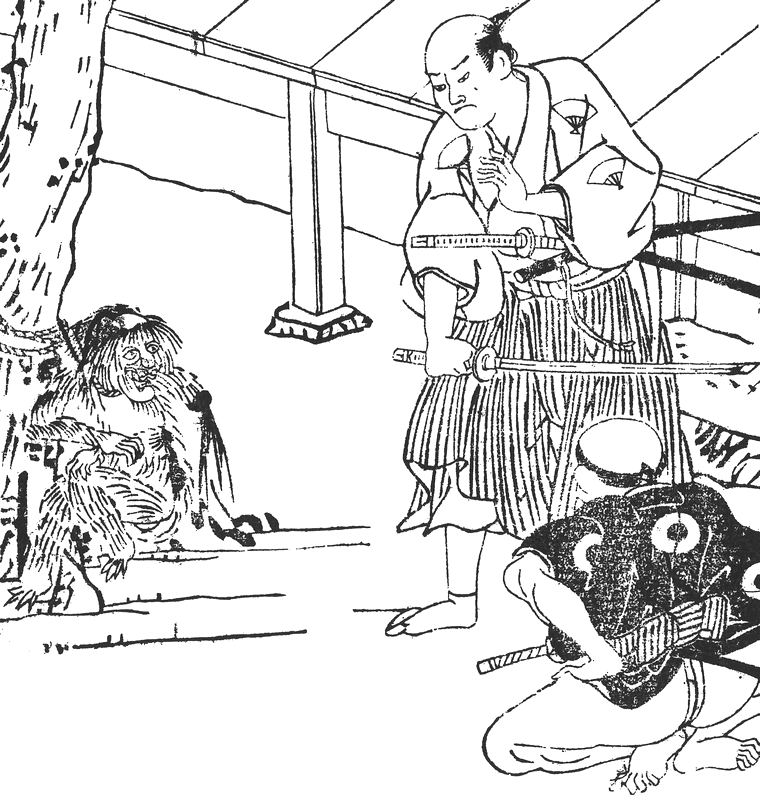
The kappa who bleeding from its arm-stump. Seiban Kaidan (1754)

There are old families purporting to have the secret medicine or its recipe learned from a kappa by an ancestor throughout the country, e.g., the Kashima (賀島) family of Tomioka town, Anan, Tokushima. (Note: This family has the black iron-dust like medicine filled in a jar, labeled Sokkōsan (即功散; lit. "Immediate effect [medicinal] powder"). Photo of the medicine in jar in Miyamto (2013). The same family also owns a purported skull of the gyūki.) Or tell of bone-setting techniques, or other treatment methods learned from the kappa.

An old example is found in Haruna Tadanari (春名忠成)'s Seiban Kaidan Jikki (西播怪談実記; "True Records of Kaidan in the Western Parts of Harima Province". Hōreki 4/1754), which relates that in Sayō District in western Harima Province, the kappa, here called a kawatora (河虎; "river tiger"), fails his attempt at horse-pulling, receives a sword-cut losing his right arm from a samurai (wrong arm shown severed in illustration, cf. fig. right), begs forgiveness, promises to cease with his misdeeds, and relinquishes the secret craft of the special bone-setting medicine, in order to have its severed arm restored.

Other regional examples are found from § Fukuoka Prefecture (Note: In Hakata saiken, the tale concerning the harassed wife of Takatori Unshōan) or § Ibaraki Prefecture. (Note: the Iwase panacea balm.)

==== Writ of Apology ====
A captured kappa barters his release by offering a solemn pledge to never cause harm again (to the livestock, etc.), in folk legends all over Japan. Typically the creature will submit a letter or writ of apology (a shōmon or written oath) and a number of such alleged documents as relics are preserved by old families and temples throughout Japan.

The kappa may also ensure water safety, i.e., protection from drownings (e.g. § Ibaraki Prefecture) (Note: Thekappa pine tale.) § Fukuoka Prefecture. (Note: The writ at Sengan-ji, in Fukuoka city.)

==== Fish ====
The grateful creature may also bring back gifts of fish, often on top of the pledge of good behavior.

§ Fukuoka Prefecture offers a tale from Hakata Bay, as well as an old literary example from Hakata saiken where the kappa brings catfish. Foster gives an example from Ōita Prefecture where the kappa ceases to bring his fish gifts after the boy forgetfully leaves an iron knife around. Similarly the fish-giving stops after a fish is left on a deer antler hook (kappa also hates antlers) in the § Fukui Prefecture example (Note: Mihama town, Mikata District, Fukui. Yoshioka family's written oath.) as well as the tale attached to the kappa komainu in the Wakamiya Shrine of Akehama, Ehime (now part of Seiyo city).

Further examples are from § Yamagata Prefecture. (Note: The physician Essai 悦斎) Gifu Prefecture, Hida Region. (Note: Horse-pulling fails, delivers river fish.)

Needless to say it is reputedly highly skilled at catching fish. (Note: As an old attestation, the Kasshi yawa writes that an informant who was a duck-catcher by trade (probably from the Hirado Domain area) claimed it catches fish and shellfish by the water's edge.) (Note: Nakamura also writes "the fact it must be adept at river-fishing.. is deducible from the grateful [animal] motif of bringing river fish".)

==== Providing labor ====
In other legends, the kappa has helped out with public works, e.g., with the swampland reclamation project around Sōgen-ji temple, cf. § Tokyo.

There is also a tale of the kappa muko-iri ("becoming bridegroom") theme (Ikeda-Aarne-Thompson motif 312B), where a farmer offers his daughter's hand in marriage to whoever successfully irrigates his dried up fields. And the kappa also helps out with more general chores in the fields, as in the tale in § Shimane Prefecture.

=== Sumo-wrestling ===
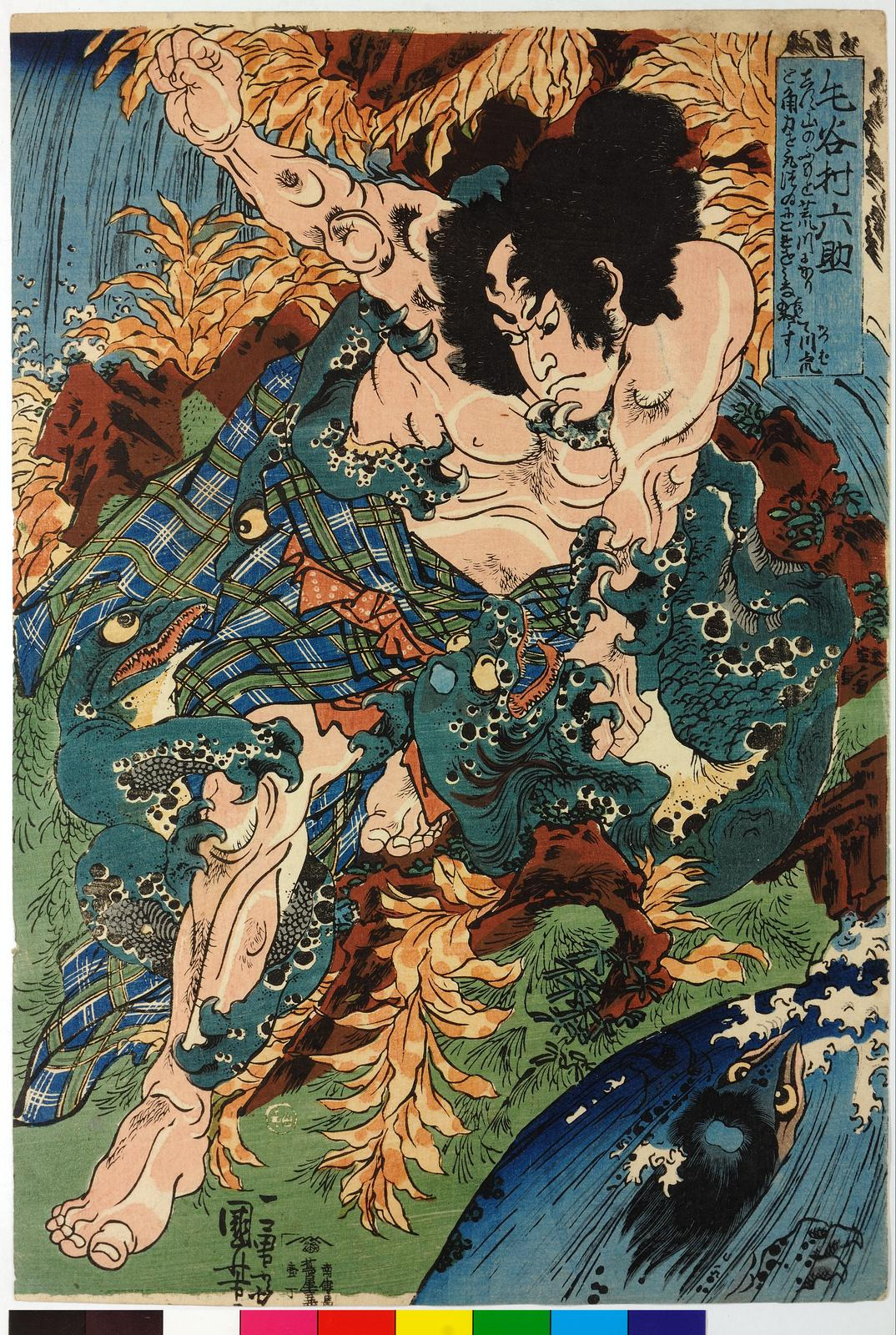
Keyamura Rokusuke and kappa ―Utagawa Kuniyoshi, Honchō kendō ryakuden: Keyamura Rokusuke(1843–1847). Held by British Museum.

The kappa is especially known for its love of sumo-wrestling. (Note: Foster (2008) citing Ishikawa (1985), pp. 163–176 and Iida (1993), pp. 153–160 Foster (2015), p. 157, Foster (2024), pp. 195–196.)

One tactic for defeating the kappa at wrestling is to trick it into taking a bow, making its head dish water spill, in order to weaken it before the bout.

Another tactic told locally in certain places is that the kappa can be beat in sumo wrestling if the opponent prepares himself by eating rice offered to the Buddhist altar. (Note: One example gives the informant as an elderly woman from Iwagi District, Hiroshima [sic] but only Iwagi, Ehime exists that borders Innoshima, Hiroshima.)

=== Cucumber ===
Folk beliefs claim the cucumber as their traditional favorite meal. At festivals, offerings of cucumber are frequently made to the kappa. Sometimes the kappa is said to have other favorite foods, such as eggplant, soba (buckwheat noodles), adzuki bean, or kabocha (Japanese pumpkin). Already in the Wakan sansai zue (1712) it is stated that kawatarō "steals squashes, eggplants, and cereals from the fields", while the Honzō kōmoku shakugi records its favorite foods as cucumber (Note: Here written 黄瓜, lit. "yellow squash" rather than the now standard 胡瓜, lit. "Persian squash".) and Saijō-gaki (variety of persimmon).

During the observance of Obon, the shōryō uma ("spirit horse") and "spirit cattle" crafted from cucumbers and eggplants are placed on altars for appeasing ancestral spirits. In most places (outside of Kantō Region) these vegetable effigies end up being sent afloat on the river or at sea. Whereas in Edo, superstitious folk used to buy cucumbers and send them down the river in order to appease the kappa, so as to avoid drownings or water accidents. Within Tokyo, there still remained in some places the custom of writing names of family members on the cucumbers being floated to beg especially their children from getting their shirikodama extracted.

In some regions, it was customary to eat cucumbers before swimming as protection, but in others it was believed that this act would guarantee an attack.

The origin of cucumber preference according to one explanation is that the kappa is a debased form of the water god, (Note: Ishida (1966) [1948]) and the first harvest of the cucumber was always considered an indispensable offering to the water god. The tradition has continued into the modern day that the first harvest must first be offered on 1 June or 15 June at the altars and coves for the kappa before humans are allowed to eat it, and some regions consider it as a gift to the Suijin water god.

=== Shirikodama ===
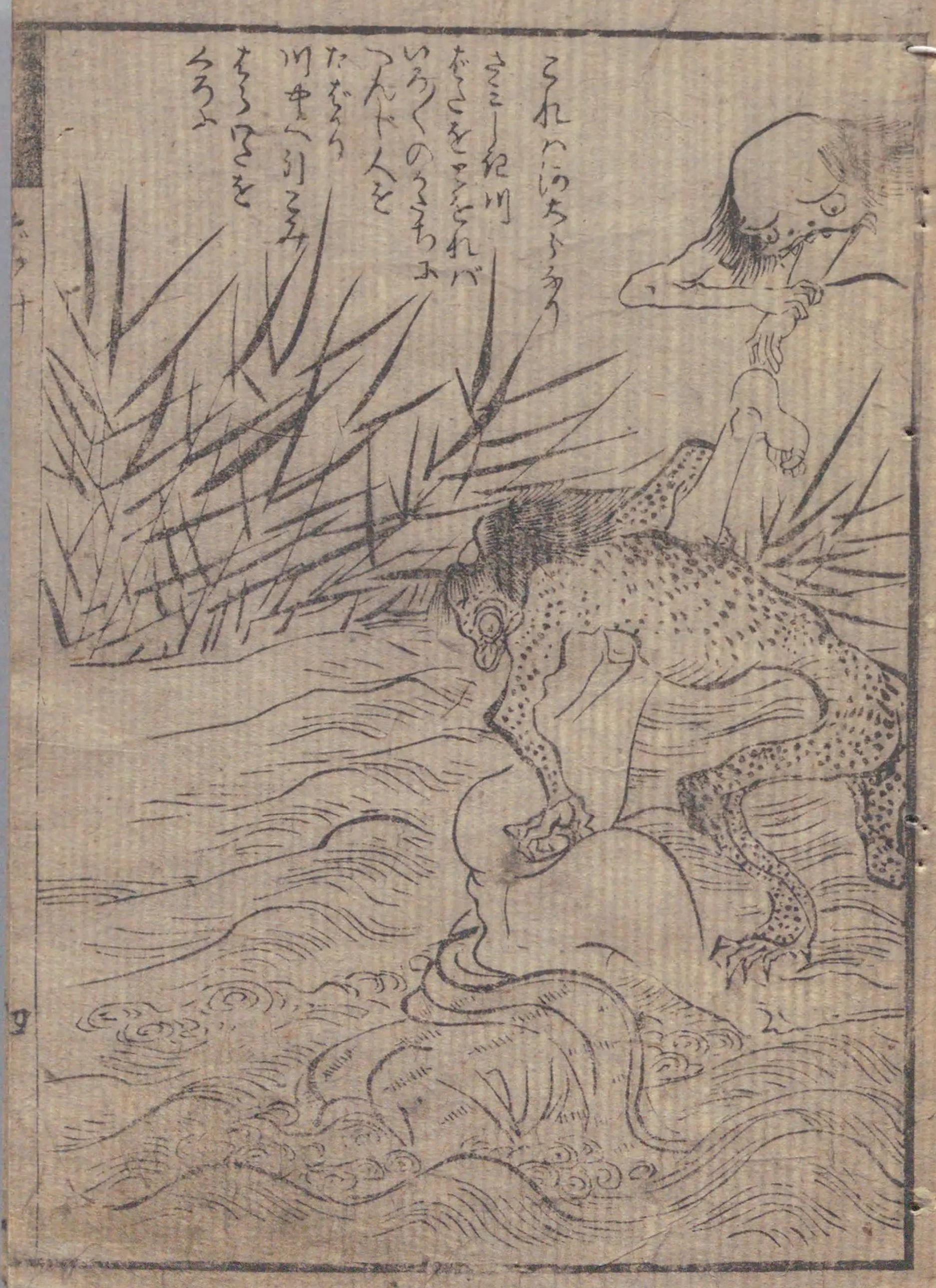
"Kawatarō extracts the shirikodama" —Illustrated by Kitao Masayoshi, Bakemonno chakutōchō(1788)

The image of the kappa extracting the shirikodama (尻子玉/尻小玉; lit. "buttocks-wee-ball") is a standard motif also. (Note: Glossed as "a ball once thought to be at the mouth of the anus", Foster (1998), pp. 6–7, citing Kindaichi(1964), New selected Japanese language dictionary 6th ed., p. 564.) This shirikodama is a fictive organ, though the folklore claims that a person bereft of it becomes funuke (lit. "organ-less", meaning stupefied or utterly unmotivated) and the person may even die.

It is also said the kappa eats this shirikodama, being its favorite food alongside cucumbers.

The Bakemonno chakutōchō (夭怪着到牒; "Monster Catalogue". pub. 1788) depicts the scene of "Kawatarō extracts the shirikodama" (Note: 河太郎尻子玉を抜く.) (Fig. right), and according to the accompanying text, the kappa drags humans into water and devour their innards, and the victims are unable to ascend to heaven, becoming wandering ghosts that cannibalize each other. It is unusual to find such explicit depiction of the extraction scene.

In Hokusai manga (Volume 12), there is an image of "The method of fishing a kappa", (Note: 河童を鉤（つ）ルの法.) where a man is squatting atop something like a swing, and sticking out his buttocks to lure the kappa, which is seen emerging from water.

This superstition of a buttocks-ball organ may derive from the fact that drowned cadavers often have an "open anus" due to distended sphincter muscles. A similar observation has been made by Minakata Kumagusu. (Note: He notes that according to folk tradition, a "water snake" is held responsible for drownings, just like a kappa (attested in the old essay, Zen'an zuihitsu), while the mythical kawahebi (lit. "river-snake") of Echigo (Niigata Prefecture) and the kawahebi (lit. "flying-snake"[?]) of Dewa (Yamagata Prefecture) devours human innards from the anus (attested in Saezuri gusa (さへづり草)). Minakata conjectures that in reality, some sort of snake or fish could conceivably enter a drowned victim's anus and start feeding, and if such disturbed remains are found, it could be attributed to the doings of a kappa monster.)

=== Horse-pulling ===
External image
- https://books.google.com/books/content?id=GqsMAAAAIAAJ&pg=PA350-IA1&img=1&zoom=3&sig=ACfU3U1T1wneRoJ-aEqlFmwJIDP09atJJg&ci=79%2C140%2C762%2C1147&edge=0 "The kappa and his victim", painting by Evelyn Paul (1912)

One characteristic is their habit of trying to pull or drag horses and cattle into water. The tale from Nishikawatsu, (§ Shimane Prefecture) was given in an abridged version as a tale from "Kawachi" village in Izumo Province by Lafcadio Hearn (1894).

Legend or folktale exhibiting this motif is ubiquitous and found from the Tōhoku region (Iwashiro Province, Rikuchū Province), Kantō region (Hitachi Province, Musashi Province, Sagami Province), Chūbu region (Echigo Province, Suruga Province, Mikawa Province, Kai Province, Shinano Province, Hida Province, Mino Province, Noto Province）, in Yamashiro Province (Kyoto), Harima Province (Hyōgo Prefecture), Chūbu region (Izumo, Nagato Province), Shikoku (Awa Province, Tosa Province), Hizen Province (Saga and Nagasaki prefectures), etc.

As in the Izumo version, many versions call for the kappa to be dragged by the horse to the stable where it is most vulnerable, and it is there it is forced to submit a § Writ of apology not to misbehave.

Already the Wakan sansai zue (1712) has recorded the folklore that the kawatarō makes use of his stretchable arm to draw in cattle and horses, sucking all blood from the rumps.

=== Weaknesses ===
The kappa reputedly abhors iron and deer antler. The Wakun no shiori (compiled from Edo to Meiji) writes that it hates deer antlers and cowpea (sasage). And if bladed weapons do not cut them, hemp stalks can pierce them, as aforementioned. The hemp stalk leaned against the door is effective at keeping the kappa away from visiting homes, according to the lore of § Shiga Prefecture.

The apes being their mortal enemies was also mentioned above.

=== Defeating the kappa ===
It was believed that there were a few means of escape if one was confronted with a kappa. Kappa are obsessed with politeness, so if a person makes a deep bow, it will return the gesture. This results in the kappa spilling the water held in the "dish" (sara) on its head, rendering it unable to leave the bowing position until the plate is refilled with water from the river in which it lives. If a person refills it, the kappa will serve that person for all eternity. A similar weakness of the kappa involves its arms, which can easily be pulled from its body. If an arm is detached, the kappa will perform favors or share knowledge in exchange for its return.

Another method involves shogi or sumo wrestling: a kappa sometimes challenges a human being to wrestle or engage in other tests of skill. This tendency is easily used to encourage the kappa to spill the water from its sara. One notable example of this method is the folktale of a farmer who promises his daughter's hand in marriage to a kappa in return for the creature irrigating his land. The farmer's daughter challenges the kappa to submerge several gourds in water. When the kappa fails in its task, it retreats, saving the farmer's daughter from the marriage. Kappa have also been driven away by their aversion to iron, sesame, or ginger.

=== Wintering in the mountains ===
In certain parts of the Japan, the appearance of the kappa in rivers is considered seasonal, as they are partly mountain-dwelling. In late autumn or winter, they travel up the mountain and confine themselves there until later spring or early summer when they descend to the rivers. Their river-dwelling forms are referred to as seko/sekoko, sekonbo, karuko, kari/kariru or kobo.

The name seko is used in the Ōita, Kumamoto, Miyazaki, and Nagasaki prefectures, and seko (var. sekoko) supposedly derives from the notion they shout out loud like seko, or men who make loud noises to scare the game during the hunt. In some parts of Kyūshū the kappa is called hyōsubo, and here also, the creature is said to become a yamawaro upon entering the mountain. Great hordes of these yamawaro are said to come down from the mountains, walking from rooftop to rooftop above the village homes to reach their rivers and become garappa, according to the lore around Kumamoto Prefecture.

In Yoshino District, Nara, it is said that the gantaro enters the mountains to become yamataro. In Wakayama, they become keshanbo. (Note: The Wakayama dialect form is earlier given as kashanbo, as explained in § Conflation with kasha)

== Iconography ==
=== Broad classification ===
The 1820 work Suiko kōryaku, etc., (explained further below) contain illustrated explanation of kappa broadly categorizable into two types: the types carrying a turtle-like shell which are hairless, and the furry types that are shell-less.

Kyōgoku and Tada (2008), writing that a single standard image of the kappa was formative during the Edo Period, similarly divides the pictorial representations of the period into 3 categories, namely the "Ape or manlike type", "Suiko type" (scaly), "Terrapin or turtle type". (Note: In their earlier collaboration, Kyōgoku & Tada (2000) came up with more elaborte classification system, with many categories such as "apeman type", "kasha type", "mountain cat type", "sea otter type". It appears they consolidtated these in 2008 into the furry, scaly, and herp types.)

The "Ape or manlike type" had its whole body covered in dense fur, said to be ape-like or even otter-like, and included wildcat-like examples as well (§ Wildcat type as migratory legend). It tended to have hair in the zanbara style, i.e., long and loosely hanging around the head. (Note: Kyōgoku and Tada also conclude this furry type general does not carry a turtle shell.)

The "Terrapin or turtle type" consisted of kappa depicted with "a pointed-mouthed face, bearing a turtle-shell on its back".

The "Suiko type" was the name the two authors use to categorized the hairless but scale-covered type kappa. (Note: Note that the suiko ("water tiger") as described in the Wakan sansai zue has some fur and tiger-claw around the knees. But its original source was the shuihu ("water tiger") described in from the Chinese pharmacopeia Bencao gangmu, which according to the latest English translation, describes it as having tiger-like fur on the head and knees.)

The progress of how the furry type became supplanted by the smooth turtle-type shall be discussed below under § Chronology, as well as the introduction of frog-like aspects stressed by scholar Ozawa Hana.

=== Chronology ===
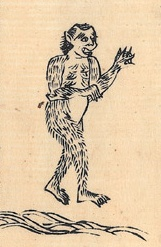
Kawatarō (aka kappa) from Wakan sansai zue (pub. 1712)

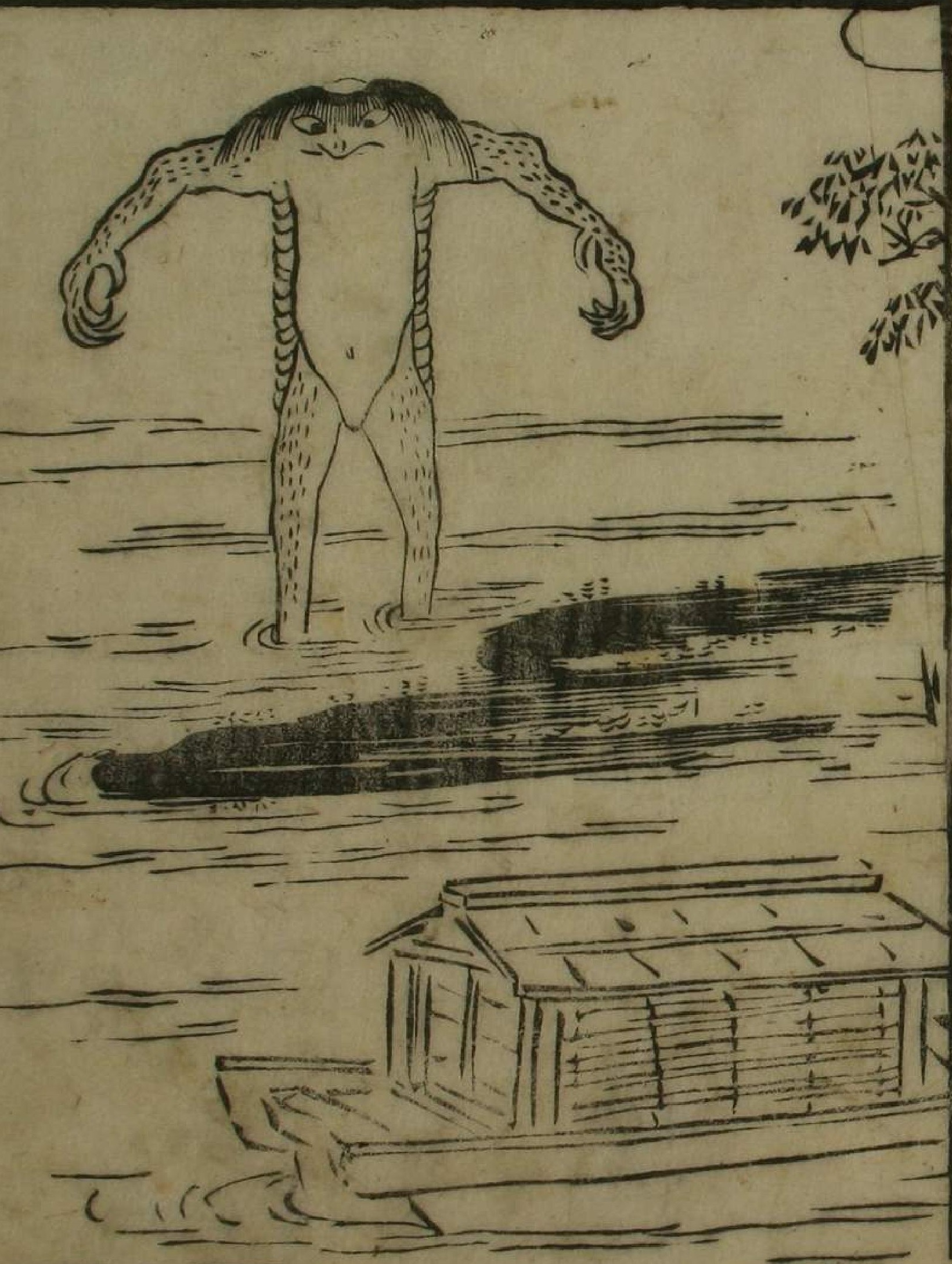
A standing kappa, from Hiraga Gennai's Nenashi-gusa, Book 5, (pub. Hōreki 13/1763)

The image of the kappa before the 18th century appears to have favored the ape-type (furry, mammalian type), and non-herp types. For instance in the Kagakushū ("Collection of Low/Mundane Studies", prefaced 1444, with later copies), it is claimed that the otter grown old becomes a kawarō (kappa), and in the Nippo Jisho (Japanese-Portuguese dictionary by the Jesuits, 1603) the entry for Cauarǒ defines it as an ape-like creature. (Note: Portuguese: bugio for "ape".)

The Wakan sansai zue (1712) carried a woodcut of the kawatarō depicted as a furry, apelike creature (cf. fig. left). (Note: Terashima Ryōan, woodcut.) Hirase Tessai (平瀬徹斎)'s Nippon sankai meibutsu zue (日本山海名物図会; "Illustrated Famous Products of the Mountains and Seas of Japan", pub. Hōreki 4/1754), the sumo-wrestling kappa appears ape-like.

In the Seiban Kaidan Jikki (西播怪談実記; "True Records of Kaidan in the Western Parts of Harima Province". 1754), the kappa (here referred to as kawatora (河虎; "river-tiger")), which had its arm sliced off, is depicted in the so-called ape type style, its entire body covered with hair (cf. fig in § Medicine). There depression and the dish-like element on its head have already appeared in the artwork by this time.

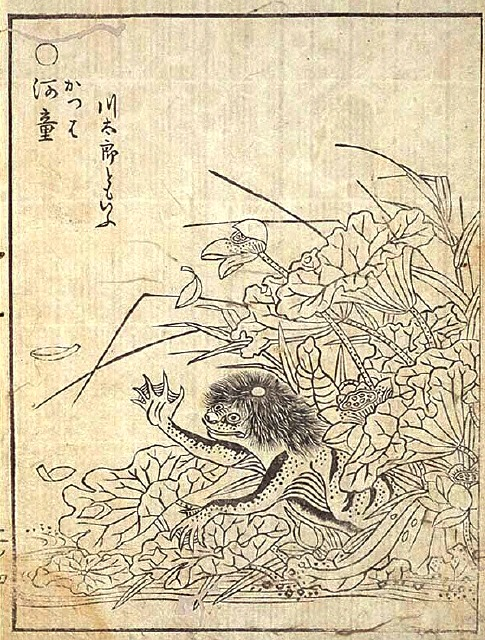
Kappa.—From Gazu Hyakki Yagyō ("The Illustrated Night Parade of a Hundred Demons") by Toriyama Sekien

The foregoing examples were written in western regions (Nagasaki, (Note: The Jesuits' Japanese-Portuguese dictionary.) Osaka, (Note: Ryōan who worote Wakan sansai zue and Tessai were both Osaka men.) etc.). However, the ape (Japanese macaque) was relatively unfamiliar to the people of Edo which had few forested mountains, and the image of a more turtle-like or frog-like kappa began to be favored, starting in the mid-18th century.

An early (c. 1763) example of this (turtle or froglike) depiction illustrations depicting the kappa as described by informants.}} and from copies made, these were all of the hairy ape-type (as explained below).

When afterwards Koga Dōan ed. Suiko kōryaku (水虎考略; lit. "A brief consideration of kappa", Bunsei 3/1820) appeared, (Note: Regarding the confusing practice of referring to the kappa by the Chinese-imported term suiko (water-tiger), cf. § 水虎と漢訳 subsection below.) (Note: Though technically, even before this earliest 1820 version of Suiko kōryaku, the Suiko setsu (水虎説; "Discourse on the Suiko", c.1820) had already appeared. The Suiko kōryaku represents a whole family of codices, with copies dated to Tenpō 7/1836, etc.) it offered a collection of 12 kappa anecdotes, of which 6 were a rehash from the Hita Domain report, so that the 6 accompanying illustrations have been judged to be facsimile copies of the original color-painted drawings. These 6 are all kappa of the ape-type (covered with fur), with a dish on its head, somewhat like a tonsure, but with untidy strands of hair hanging loose on the side. (Note: The hairdo term used here by Ozawa is zanbara-gami (ザンバラ髪).) One kappa figure is shown wearing a sumo wrestler's loincloth (mawashi). On the page opposite to it, there is a detailed drawing of a webbed foot, so that might count as technically as the 7th drawing copied. The other half of the kappa illustrated in Suiko kōryaku are 6 illustrations of the "softshell turtle-type".

Another turning point in pictorial representation occurred when naturalist Kurimoto Tanshū (d. 1834) published his depictions of the kappa in his work Senchūfu (千蟲譜; lit. "Album of a thousand vermin", preface dated 1811), which showed the creature with a tapered mouth, probably based on a life drawing from a real softshell turtle. Tanshū also authored the Suiko kō (水虎考; "Consideration on the kappa") (date unknown, a Tenpō 13/1843 copy is extant).

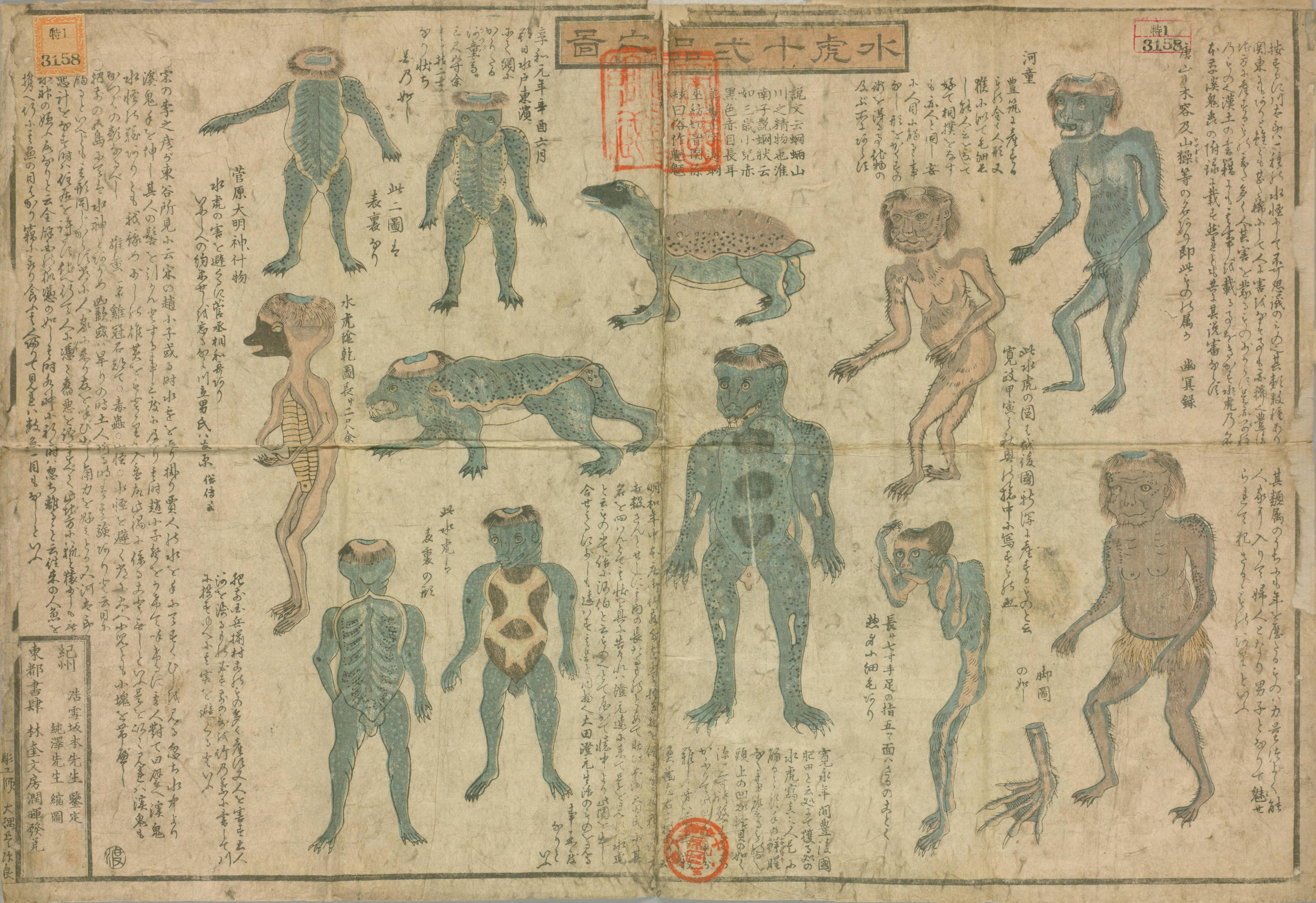
Suiko jūnihin no zu illustrating twelve kinds of kappa

The Suiko jūnihin no zu (水虎十二品之図; "Illustration of 12 types of suiko [kappa]", first pub. c. 1850?) (cf. Fig. right) also contains softshell turtle-like depictions of kappa (Note: Novelist Taneo Harada complains of the discussion in Suiko kōryaku, but further can be quoted as writing: "especially the illustration of the kappa captured at Hita, Bungo (now Hita, Ōita), in the Kan'ei era, in the Illustration of 12 types of suiko is completely devoid of realism in its depiction, and is but a cartoon".) as well as some ape-types. This single-sheet work was authored by Kishū Domain physician and naturalist Sakamoto Hōnen and illustrated by his brother Juntaku, also a physician. Being of later vintage, there are some modifications made with additional material, but this is still considered a derivative work descended from the 12-kappa Suiko kōryaku family of codices.

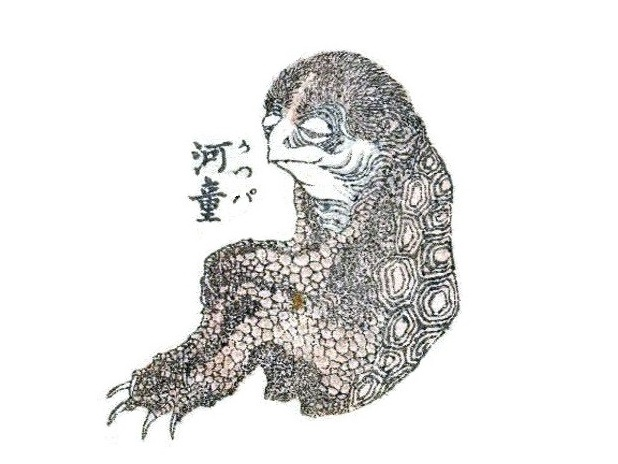
A kappa by Katsushika Hokusai —Hokusai Manga, Volume 3, p. 72

A kappa by Katsushika Hokusai in Hokusai Manga, Volume 3 is posed in a squatting position (Note: taiiku-suwari (体育座り, "gym sitting") position, to use a Japanese term) (cf. Fig. above), depicted with a beak-like mouth and carapace, and may arguably be considered a turtle-type example. (Note: Though being covered with fine scales is not exactly like a lifelike turtle.) There is another depiction of kappa in Hokusai Manga, under Volume 12, which is clearly based on a soft-shell turtle.

A disciple named Katsushika Hokuga also drew Kappa zu depicting a kappa riding a giant cucumber, and it is of the tapered-mouth type. It wears a mino cape around its waist. (Note: In the collection of Yumoto, Kōichi, (Miyoshi Museum))

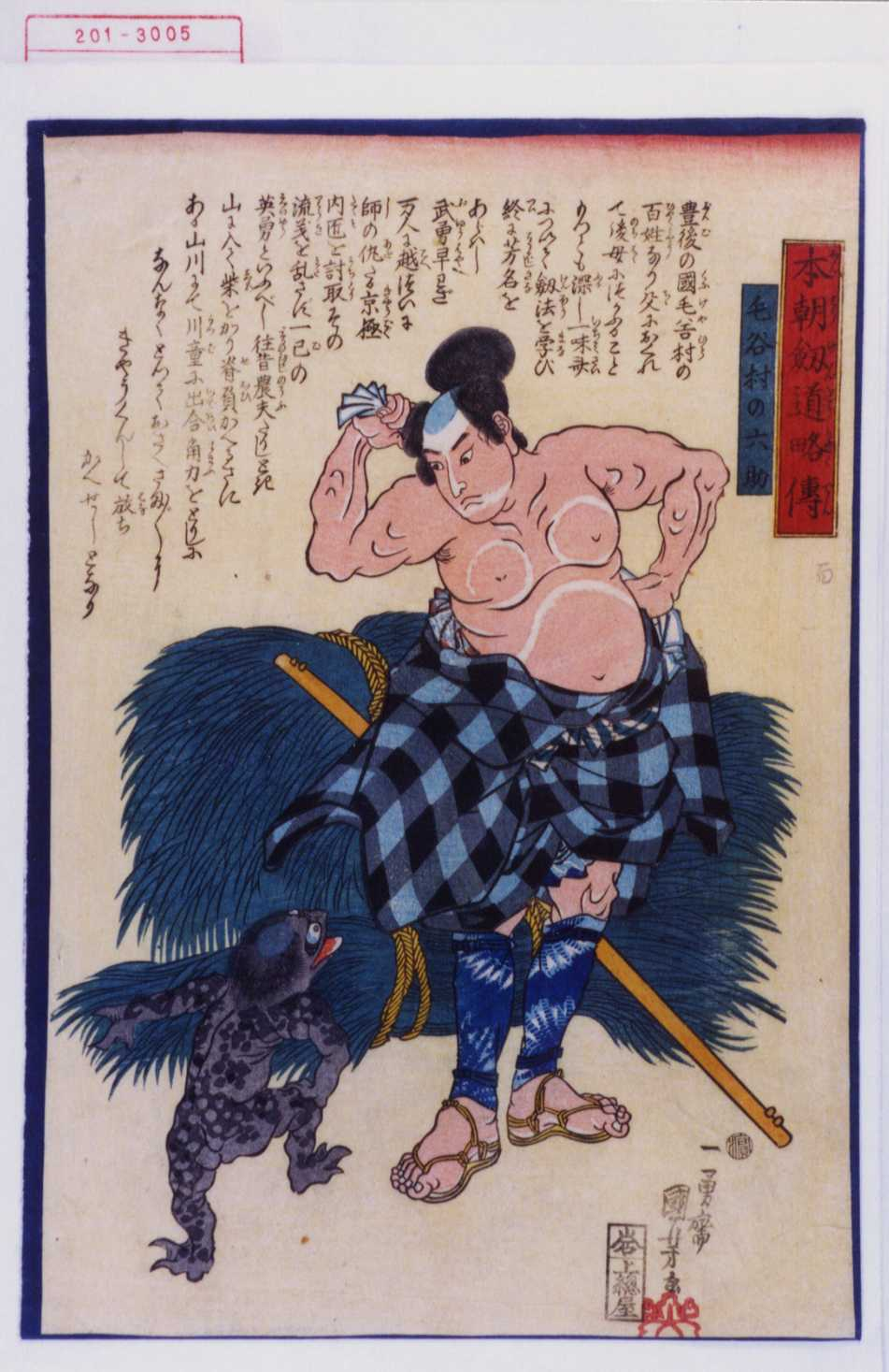
Keyamura no Rokusuke and kappa. ―Utagwa Kuniyoshi, Honchō kendō ryakuden series (c. 18431–1847). Held by Waseda University.

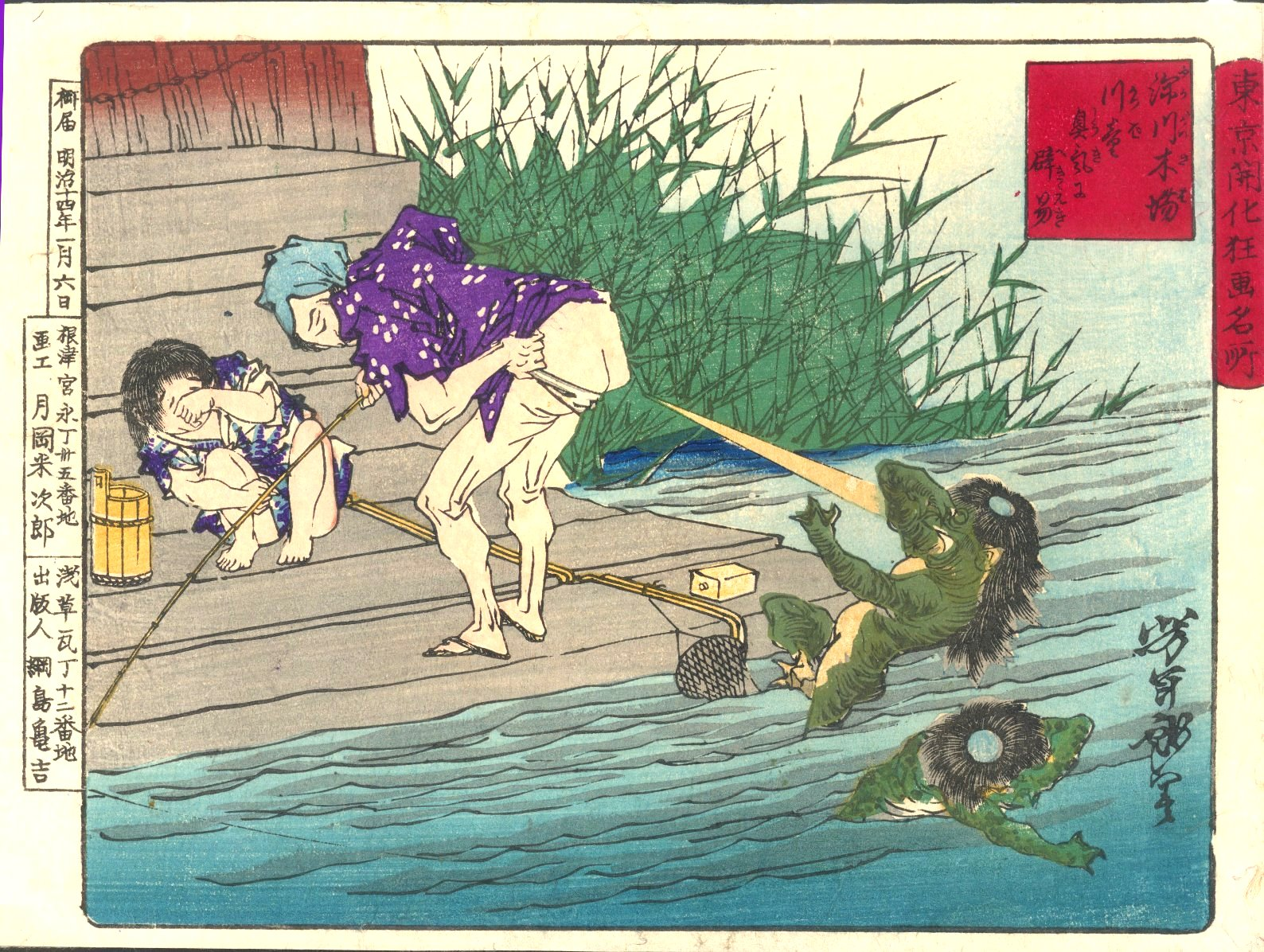
Counterattacking a kappa with flatulence. By Tsukioka Yoshitoshi.

By the mid-19th century, frog-like features started to creep in more on the kappa's image. In Utagawa Toyokuni III's Dai-Nihon rokujū yoshū no uchi Kazusa: Shirafuji Genta (大日本六十余州之内・上総 白藤源太; "Sixty-odd provinces of great Japan, of which Kazusa Province: Shirafuji Genta", Tenpō 14/1843–Kōka 4/1847), the kappa has the turtle's shell and rather turtle-like sharp claws, but has a mouth-shape and patterning rather like a frog. And in the contemporaneous series by Utagawa Kuniyoshi, Honchō kendō ryakuden (本朝剣道略伝; "Abridged Stories of Our Countrys Swordsmanship", c. 1843–1847), the album on Keyamura Rokusuke features a kappa without even a turtle-shell, furthering its likeness to a frog (cf. fig. left and fig. above).

Then a more "comical and affectionate" image of the kappa was formed by ukiyo-e artists. A prime example of this was a piece by Tsukioka Yoshitoshi called Tōkyō kaika kyōga meisho: Fukagawa Kiba. Kappa shūki ni hekieki (東京開化狂画名所・深川木場川童臭気に辟易; "kappa flabbergasted by stench") (1881, cf. Fig. right), showing two kappa being farted on by a human, and one kappa turning yellow.

Later in the modern age, Nihonga artist Ogawa Usen (1868-1938) favored the kappa theme and drew many, earning him the moniker Kappa no Usen. Late in his life he published the collection Kappa hyakuzu (1938), developing a vivacious image of the kappa.

The humorous kappa given birth in the Edo Period was carried on by later generations. In the Shōwa era, manga artist Kon Shimizu serialized Kappa kawatarō which ran in Shōgakusei Asahi magazine, 1951–1952, and Kappa Tengoku that ran in the Shūkan Asahi weekly, 1953–1958, through which a cute and comical image of the kappa penetrated to the masses. At the same time Usen's work is seen to have humanized the image of the kappa, as he drew them engaging in a whole array of human activities.

Thus, while the turtle-shell persists, the heavily frog-like form has established itself as the standard kappa image.

== Local legends ==
The kappa is among the best-known yōkai in Japan. It is known by various names according to region and local folklore.

All over Japan there remains the practice of making offerings (often cucumbers) at shrines to placate the kappa. There are places that identify and enshrine the kappa as suijin ("water deity"). In fact, the kappa may have descended from the worship of such suijin deity (as already discussed under § Origins).

While it is by no means unusual for harvest rituals to occur in the spring and autumnal equinoxes, scholars have tied the timing to the welcoming back and ushering out of the kappa that spends half the year in the rivers but goes away into the mountains for the remainder (as already discussed under § Wintering in the mountains).

The tendency to identify the kappa as the principal enshrined being at suijin festivals appears more prevalent in Western Japan, while at the Kahaku Shrine (河伯神社) of Nankoku, Kōchi enshrines a kappa by the name of enkō. In such Shintō framework, the kappa may be considered to be an avatar (keshin 化身) of the water deity.

=== Kyūshū region ===
In Kyūshū there is a legend concerning Kusenbō (九千坊), the name of a kappa boss. Kusenbō (whose name means "Nine-thousand fellow") had 9000 underling kappa, and was based in the Kuma and Chikugo River holding dominion over all of Saikaidō (Kyūshū). Legend has it that the warlord Katō Kiyomasa angered by the Kusenbō gang's misdeeds gathered all the apes he could from Kyūshū to help subdue them. (Note: Recorded in Honchō zokugenshi (本朝俗諺志; "(Records on Popular Japanese Proverbs", pub. 1746) by Kikuoka Senryō.) Another legend has it that the gang lost the war over the Tone River against the local gang under neneko.

For the Kumamoto Prefecture lore about the kappa descending in hordes after winter cf. also § Wintering in the mountains above.

==== Fukuoka Prefecture ====
The decisive sea battle in the War between the Genji and Heike was the Battle of Dan-no-ura that took place in the straight between today's Yamaguchi Prefecture and Fukuoka Prefecture. There is legend in Yamaguchi about that the Heike men turned into Heike crabs while the women-folk escaped to Fukuoka. One such legendary escapee is the Amagozen (海御前/尼御前) (the historical Azechi no tsubone Ise).

Chiyo Amagozen (千代尼御前) allegedly survived and came to Chikugo Province, or so claims writings such as the Chikugo-gaku yurai (筑後楽由来; "Derivation of the Chikugo music") and Suitengū engi (水天宮縁起; "Origin of the Suitengū shrine"); she is supposedly enshrined at the Amagozen-sha shrine in Senoshita-machi (瀬下町) town in Kurume, Fukuoka, which has been argued to be the origin of the Suitengū worship. She is also said to have become the wife of the water deity of the Kose River, while it is said that the Heike who defeated by Ogata Koreyoshi transformed into kahaku river spirits of the Kose River (Note: Written var. 巨勢川 for 巨瀬川.) (accord. Ongaku engi (音楽縁起)), thus providing rich material for kappa studies.

Chikugogaku yurai is the document explaining the origins of Chikugo-gaku, commonly called Kappa-gaku, (Note: Teiri Nakamura uses Chikugo-gaku straight from the document, but this name is not seen to be in current use, while Kappa-gaku is well-attested, even though its adoptive use may be modern, with 1955 being the earliest example known to Yamauchi.) explains that the ghosts of the dead and fugitives attached to the losing Heike clan turned into kappa (or kahaku), and the music was devised in order to assuage these hapless spirits. (Note: Nakamura uses Chikugo-gaku yurai as a generic name for several copies which he says are of identical wording, while Yamamoto gives and orderly list of varying titles, shrine, and music style.){{Refn|group="lower-alpha"|Within the origin documents are liturgical texts by such titles as Heike kahaku henshin saimon (平家河伯変身祭文; "Liturgy of Heike transforming to kahaku", which most commentators equate with kappa though Yamauchi thinks kahaku was the more primitive legend, and certain distinction are discernible.) while the place of origin of the music was a (fictive) village called Chiyo Nakamura (千代中村) in Chikugo.

Even though Kappa-gaku is still performed at certain spots within Chikugo (Fukuoka Prefecture), e.g. at the Kitano Tenmangū of Kurume, (Note: Kitano Tenmangū usually refers to the shrine in Kyōto dedicated to Sugawara Michizane aka Tenjin-sama. The one in Kurume is more minor than another local one, the Dazaifu Tenmangū at the place of his exile.) there are far more places where Kappa-gaku is kept alive in Buzen or Bungo (Eastern Fukuoka and Ōita Prefecture). (cf. § Ōita Prefecture below).

A water festival is held each year in August at the Suitengū in Kurume. While suitengū is a local name for kappa, used by residents of Chikugo Province according to a 19th century text, it appears that Suitengū came to be regarded as a higher-tiered water deity, with kappa reduced to the god's minion servant. According to one tale, a kappa in mortal fear of the Suitengū god came drifting down to Inunaki River, (Note: Here it engaged in a sumo match with a man named Jingorō, and the man seemed to be on the edge of losing, when the villager shouted "Jingorō is the Suitengū's child mōshigo", which caused the kappa to flee.) Chanting "Suitengū's mōshigo ("sworn blessed child of the god")" is supposed to fend against the kappa trying to drag a person into water. (Note: "Chikuhō no minwa 筑豊の民話, 1958-02-10 issue.)

The Takahashi-jinja of Yoshii-machi in Ukiha city (formerly Yoshii town), which is situated by the Kose River, holds an annual kappa sumo tournament in September. (Note: Nakamura conjectures that its origin is tied to the circulation of rituals or charms against water disaster and praying for rain, which started at the advent of floodings in the Kyōwa era. In Kyōwa 2/1802, the Tone River flooded, and a mountain tsunami (mudslide) event occurred with the Chikugo River that same year. Some years later in Kasshi yawa Vol. 65 (c. 1822) author Matsura Seizan writes of an amulet of a kappa labeled Fukutarō ("good luck lad") to be used as "water disaster charm" and "charm against pox" which was circulating the year before in his fiefdom (Hirado Domain, Nagasaki). Seizan writes that this originates from a fisherman's family in Kanazawa village, Sagami Province (now in Kanagawa Prefecture), who were in the habit of using charms against water disaster, then one night in 1801, the elder sister of the man, named Shigeemon dreamt a visit from a kappa-like child instructing that a shrine be built.)

One legend dating to the time of Chikugo Province, Tenmei 3/1783, at Momochi (now in Sawara-ku, Fukuoka), a vassal samurai was getting the fish he caught on his fishing pole stolen. Three teenage sons kept watch and saw what looked like a dark-skinned boy about 7, 8 years of age making off with the fish basket. After spilling its dish water, it was subdued, when the parent appeared and in exchange of the child kappa's release, submitted a written oath that no drownings shall occur along Momochi's shore for the next 80 years, which was entrusted to Sengan-ji (千眼寺) (extant temple at Fujisaki, Sawara-ku).

Another legend attached to the old place name Jigyō (now in Chuo-ku, Fukuoka) concerns a sake-drinking kappa. It was drunken and asleep leaning on a pine tree under a moonlit sky. A boatman named Kahei oared out doing some fishing while drinking at the same time, the kappa approached but was refused sharing the sake and got shooed away, so it later stole back and drank all the sake, the kappa was forgiven after offering to bring fish to the man on days of a bad catch. The pine was a known monument by the mouth of the Hii River and stood until modern times.

==== Ōita Prefecture ====
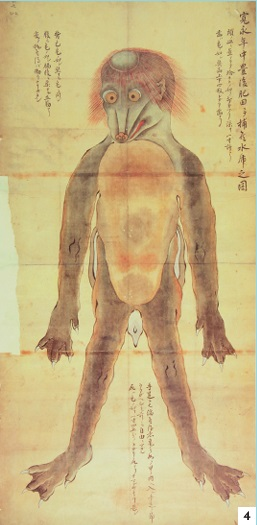
A copy of the kappa allegedly captured in Hita,（Kawasaki City Museum

A kappa allegedly caught in Hita, Bungo Province (now Hita, Ōita during the Kan'ei era is depicted as a colored painting held by the Kawasaki City Museum (cf. Fig. right). Another copy dates the event to Kan'ei 3 or year 1626, namely the one made by an Osaka physician Shunrinsai Toyozumi (春林斎豊住) in 1805, and given the title Kappa shinzu (河童真図; "True illustration of kappa"), now held by the Akashi City Museum of Culture (明石市立文化博物館)) A copy of also exists on the Suiko jūnihin no zu ("Illustration of 12 types"), but the quality of the illustration has been lambasted by Taneo Harada.

At the Kumo Hachimangū shrine in what was formerly Yabakei-machi town (now merged into Nakatsu), the kappa gaku (河童楽) (colloquially called Kappa Matsuri or festival) involves music (flute, bell, and drum) and playacting: four children are selected to portray the ghosts of the Heike turned kappa, while four youths are assigned to wave a great kara uchiwa (唐団扇; "China fan"), in an act of appeasing the kappa spirits.

There are schools of performance which differ for the kappa festivals held at other shrines, so that Kumo Hachimangū uses the Miyazono gaku (宮園楽), while the Iseyama Dai-jingū shrine of Ōkubo, in the same Yabakei-machi, employs the Hiyamaji gaku (樋山路楽) style, and the Kameoka Hachiman-jinja at the former Yamakuni-machi town employs the Shiraji gaku (白地楽) style and the Kitsuki-jinja (亀都起神社) in Kusu town employed the Yamada gaku (山田楽) (currently discontinued).

As aforementioned, Ōita is more of the epicenter of kappa gaku (河童楽) nowadays, even thought the repertoire is also called Chikugo gaku (筑後楽) as it had originated in Chikugo (Fukuoka Prefecture). The Chikugo-gaku yurai ("Derivation of the Chikugo music") (Note: Yamamoto gives Chikugo-gaku yurai as the title specifically of the Miyazono-gaku or Kumo Hachimangū origin document, but Teiri Nakamura uses it as a generic title and applies it to "copies" at the Iseyama-daijingū shrine of Ōkubo or the Kitsuki-jinja shrine (cff. supra), with an additional copy at the Kankō kaikan Kura (Tourism office in a former brewery storehouse), and deems all of them to contain the same text.) admits that the music has its roots in the village called Chiyo no Nakamura (千代の中村). And while not definitive, a source claims the music originated in Jōkyō 3/1686. (Note: Origin myth of ditto Yabakei-town, Hiyama 樋山 settlement.)

==== Nagasaki Prefecture ====
In one narrative collected from Iki Island, a woman whose true identity was a female kappa leaves her wealthy husband, and dives into the well to escape to sea. At the bottom of the well there remained remnants of a wan bowl. Orikuchi likens this episode to the "Shinoda wife" story (where the vixen Kuzunoha leaves a poem as she leaves her family).

In a cognate tale localized in Hirado Domain, the female kappa is not the wife but a maidservant, and after dropping a plate and cracking it, she gets slashed by the sword by her master who is a samurai. She transforms back into a kappa and escapes to sea.

From Fukue Island in the southern part of the Gotō Islands chain, is a story about a sumo-loving man breaking off a kappa's arm in victory, but gave the arm back after a few days, and the creature as a token of gratitude brought a huge "green stone" (ao ishi) that required ten men to carry. (Note: Gotō minzoku zushi 五島民俗図誌. Lore of Fukue, Nagasaki.)

Another such stone at a Suijin water deity shrine occurs at the water source of the Hongōchi (Note: 本河内.) quarters of Nagasaki city, and the shrine boasts a kappa ishi or kappa stone. Years past, a Shibue family member serving as head priest welcomed the May festival (lunar Double Fifth) (Note: In the Saga Prefecture example, the bamboo shoots were also served on the 5-5 day.) and pretended to entertain the prankish kappa with a meal of bamboo shoots. In actuality, only his fare were tender shoots, and the kappa were served hardened bamboo rings that confounded them, thus serving them deserved punishment.

==== Saga Prefecture ====
At Shiomi-jinja (潮見神社) in former Tachibana village, Kishima District (now part of Takeo city), the Shibue clan (branch of Tachibana clan) is enshrined as a kappa-tamer serving the water god. Within its grounds once stood the Seimon ishi (誓文石; "Oath text stone"), commemorating an alleged event that a kappa was caught and bound up by a Shibue family ancestor and made to swear never to take another human until a flower blooms on this very stone. The Shibue clan used to bring bamboo shoots as food gift every May festival (lunar Double Fifth), so it is told, later leading to the custom of (everyone) offering bamboo shoots to the water god. (The Shibue family of shrine-keepers, the kappa, and bamboo shoots also appears in the legends of § Nagasaki).

==== Kumamoto Prefecture ====
The legend of Katō Kiyomasa gathering an army of monkeys to subdue the kappa is localized in Kumamoto.

The village of Ishiwara in Hōtaku District, Kumamoto (now Ishiwara machi in Kumamoto City) has passed on a legend that when one of the village boys was taken by a kappa, the village lord named Ishiwara Kanainosuke (石原叶之介) stormed out to its den in Shirakawa River and battled it, wrenching off its arm, which turned out to be straw stalks. When the kappa asked for the return of its arm, Ishiwara complied after the kappa gave strict promise never to resort to such mischief at the village again.

Local folklore claims that the kappa can only submerge in water for 12 hours, but the ape (Japanese macaque) can stay underwater for 24 hours, and is able to defeat the kappa(former Kamimatsukuma village, Yatsushiro District, collected in 1952)

=== Shikoku region ===
==== Kōchi Prefecture ====
A legend written down claims that in the autumn (Note: On the lunar 12th day of the 9th month of) Bunsei 3/1820, a strange creature (perhaps enkō or kappa) was trapped in the mullet-catching net in Shimanto River (Note: The specific place is given as "Noego" on Ōshima Rokuchō-shima[?] (大島六町島ノエゴ), but is unclear.) by Kanematsu Tasuke (Note: 兼松多助, who was a shōya (≈nanushi).) of Nabeshima village in Hata District (now in Shimanto city). It measured 2.5 shaku (about 75 centimetres (30 in)) and was blackish, entirely furry including the arms and legs, but not the face which was pale, ape-like, but smooth. It was slippery like the feel of an eel when stroked. And emitting a gamy odor. This was documented in Okamoto Mafuru (岡本真古)'s San'an manpitsu (三安漫筆)(An'ei 9–Ansei 3). (Note: Japanese: "文政三年九月十二日。ところは、四万十川、大島六町島ノエゴ…ボラ網にかかった、そのあやしき物は…惣身手足とも毛生へ、色はいげよりハ黒き方ニて手あらく、手にて撫れハうなきの手さわりの心地ニて、とろとろとすべり候".)

=== Chūgoku region ===
==== Shimane Prefecture ====
In Izumo Province, the Yakushi temple pavilion in Nishikawatsu, Shimane (now in Yatsuka District, Shimane) boasted of holding in its possession a kawauso no shōmono (川獺の証文; "kawauso's written oath"). The kawauso (lit. "otter") is a local name for the kappa, which the villagers also called kawako in slang , within the narrative that is told. The kawako attempted to draw away a horse, but was dragged towards the village instead and captured. For a while it agreed to help out with work in the fields, but it could not check its old habit of targeting the buttocks, and the villagers had to fend it off with a roof tiles. Eventually, it was made to ink-stamp a written promise to do no more harm, and released. (Note: In Takagi ed. (1913) regurgitated by Ishikawa (1985), p. 106.) (Note: In Araki ed. (1982) taken from Izumo no minwa minyōshū and Takeagi ed. Nihon densetsushū.) Thus if a child chants "Unshū [Izumo Province] Nishikawachi-mura" this is said to fend against drownings in parts of Izumo.

The same story (lacking the details of the levied field chores and the kappa's anus-attacking mischief) was given by Izumo resident Lafcadio Hearn (1894), though the place name "Kawachi" which Hearn gave has been pointed out to be erroneous for Kawatsu. (Note: "Annotation by Sakai 酒井: "「河内」ではなく「川津」である.. 「川津村=現在の西川津町」となる")

=== Tōhoku region ===
Shrines are dedicated to the worship of kappa as water deity in Aomori Prefecture as Suiko-sama (Osshiko-sama). In Miyagi Prefecture also, at the Isora Shrine, etc., the creature is venerated as water god and given venerated names such as Kappa-gami-san (河童神さん) or Okappa-sama (おかっぱ様).

==== Iwate Prefecture ====
The best known place where it has been claimed the kappa resides is in the Kappabuchi, a river pool in Tōno, Iwate Prefecture. The pool occurs in the Ashiarai River which flows behind the nearby Jōkenji temple. In Tōno, the Jōken-ji Buddhist temple has a komainu dog statue with a depression on its head reminiscent of the water-retaining dish on the kappa, said to be dedicated to the kappa which according to legend helped extinguish a fire at the temple. In his Tōno Monogatari, Kunio Yanagita records a number of beliefs from the Tōno area about women being accosted and even impregnated by kappa. Their offspring were said to be repulsive to behold, and were generally buried.

==== Yamagata Prefecture ====
Mantei Sōba (万亭叟馬)'s Yuriwaka nozue no taka (由利稚野居鷹; "The Wild Falcon of Yuriwaka"), illustrated by Hokusai (preface dated Bunka 4/1807), relates the tale that a kappa was captured by villagers near the castle town of Dewa Province (Shōnai Domain), and handed over to the physician Essai (悦斎/悅齎) perhaps to be ground up as medicine. The physician treated and released it, and subsequently received regular gifts of fish.

=== Kansai region ===
==== Shiga Prefecture ====
In the Kansō jigo (1793–1797), its entry on the kappa lore of Ōmi Province (now Shiga Prefecture) records that the creature was known colloquially as kawara. Large number of this creature supposedly inhabited the Lake Biwa system, hunting or abducting people, or even visiting people's homes at night and calling out to the residents. Charms for avoiding their harassment included propping up (or burning) hemp stalks, and wearing sasage (cowpeas) on your person.

=== Chūbu region ===
==== Fukui Prefecture ====
In what was Wakasa Province, at Sata in Mihama town in Mikata District, Fukui, comes a story that an ancestor leading a cow/ox at a beach called Oda-hama, when the beast appeared to be pulled away by something. Reciting the sutra caused a kappa to appear, and it confessed that it was obliged to make an offering of shirikodama (butt organ) of human or beast at the Gion Matsuri in Kyoto, but as he had none he was resorting to theft. Begging to be spared its life, it promised to surrender a written promise never to harm man or beast at this beach again. The next day, the writ of promise arrived, and gifts of fish kept arriving for some days, until someone left a fish hanging on an antler used as hook, and the gifts ceased to arrive.

=== Kanto region ===
==== Ibaraki Prefecture ====
The vicinity of Ushiku Pond (in Ryūgasaki, Ibaraki and near Ushiku) (Note: Painter Usen Ogawa spent most of his life on the edge of this pond.) is rich with kappa lore. A story tells of a mischievous kappa that was captured and tied to a pine, but after mending its ways and earning its release promised to offer protection from water disasters. The commonplace tale of the kappa who was reunited with his severed hand giving out the secret recipe of the kappa's wonder drug is found here also. A physician named Maki Ryōhon[?] (真木了本) from Ōmiya or Kamiiwase in Naka District, Ibaraki (Note: Now in Hitachiōmiya city.) found what looked like some fingers or toes, and reunited these with the kappa, from which the family learned the recipe for the "Iwase panacea balm" (岩瀬万能膏).

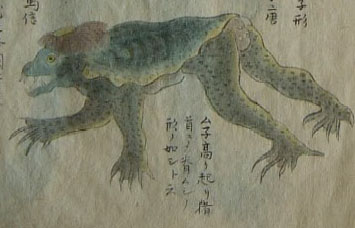
The kappa allegedly caught off the eastern shore of the Mito Domain in 1801 —Copied from Koga Tōan's Suiko Kōryaku ( "A brief consideration of kappa", 1820).

A capture of the creature was claimed to have happened during the Edo Period in Mito Bay (Note: This "Mito-ura" is not currently a formal geographic name, and is uncertain, but from the report, it can be surmised the capture happened in the sea off of the area around Ōarai town or former Nakaminato, Ibaraki (now Hitachinaka cit).) in the year Kyōwa 1/1801. The report of it together with the painting of a turtle-like kappa can be found in Asakawa Zen'an's Zen'an zuihitsu (pub. 1850), and it also shows a lateral pose of it crawling on all fours (cf. Fig. right). According to the text, its anatomical structure was such that the head could retract about 80% of the way inside the carapace, and it seemed boneless. It had three anuses, allegedly, and its flatulence sounded like sussuh (スッ／＼).

==== Tokyo ====
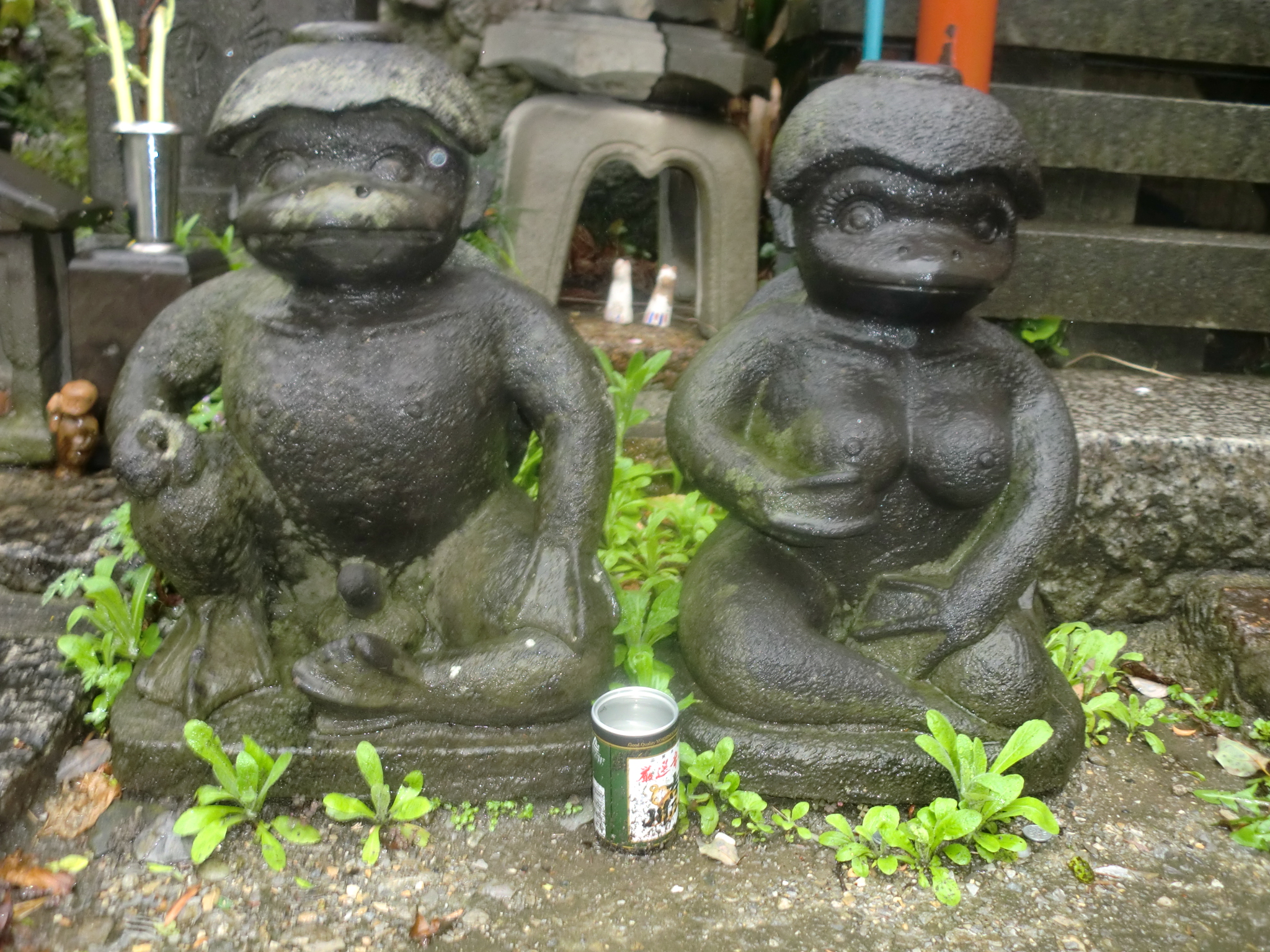
Paired male and female kappa statues at the Sogenji Buddhist shrine at the Asakusa district in Tokyo

The kappa daimyōjin has been venerated at the Sōgen-ji temple at Asakusa, Tokyo since the Bunka era (1804–1818), when the temple's legendary records say the creature helped with the drainage of marshes and land reclamation in the surrounding marshland that was unfit for habitation. The temple also houses a mummified hand of an alleged kappa. The origin tale around Kappabashi also speaks of kappa's involvement in the building of the bridge. The historical fact that was the germ behind this legend was that a philanthropist named Kappaya Kihachi (合羽屋喜八) contributed to the water management effort and was interred at the Kappa-dō pavilion of this temple.

== Parallels ==
Similar folklore can be found in Asia and Europe. In Chinese and in Scandinavian lore, there is a comparable river monster that, like the kappa, likes to draw horses into water, or demands horse as sacrifice. The Spring and Autumn Annals of Wu and Yue quotes Wu Zixu (Note: Yoshida gives as "[Wu] Tzǔ-hsü [伍]子胥" who is the famous politician invoked here, not the author of the work itself, who is Zhao Ye.) recounting a man named Jiao Qiusu losing his horse to such a river spirit. (Note: Yoshida gives as Chao Chiu-su 椒丘訴.)

The Slavic waterman (vodyanoy of Russia, vodník or hastrmann of Czechia, Wassermann of Bohemian Germans, etc.), which demands horses as sacrifice (though cattle, sheep, etc. is used as well) has also been compared to the kappa. In the folklore of the Western Slavic Wends (Sorbs), the nix "draws cows into the water each day at midday".

== Origins ==
An oft-cited hypothesis attributed to Kunio Yanagita is that the kappa is a debased end-product of what used to be a venerated water deity (suijin). (Note: Or Foster (1998), p. 5: "lower status spirit", citing Chiba (1988), p. 28)

Using this hypothesis as a linchpin, Eiichirō Ishida's Kappa komabikikō (河童駒引考; "Consideration on the kappa's steed-tugging") sought to establish that the kappa's horse-tugging nature had its roots in some sort of cattle or horse sacrifice ritual to the water deities. But as attestation of such was wanting in Japan, he expanded his search to the Eurasian continent. Noting that in China there was an ancient practice of submerging cattle or horse as offering to the "Lord of Rivers" (Hebo, 河伯), Ishida conjectured that kappa may be traced back to an importation of lore from China.

Regardless of whether the Japanese veneration of the water deity owes its origin to China, there are enshrinements, festivals, or rituals associated with the kappa=suijin (water god) in various places in Japan (as discussed below in § Local legends) If the primordial kappa' was a Shinto deity, it would fit well with the model that the Yama-no-Kami (mountain god) can turn into a river god by shifting his spot of residence, as local kappa (such as hyōsubo) are purported to exhibit this mountain-to-river seasonal migration behavior, as already discussed in § Wintering in the mountains.

It has also been speculated that the hitogata ("man-shape", cutout paper dolls, etc.) employed as yorishiro (medium for spiritual possession) may have influenced the iconography of the kappa.

It is also considered possible that kappa may have originated from a straw effigy or a scarecrow, which squares with the kappas attributed notion that pulling its right arm shrinks its left.

And according to the local lore of Tōno, Iwate, the redness of the kappa of this northerly region is ascribable to the creature being a metaphor of economically induced infanticide (mabiki, lit. "thinning"). (Note: The connection between practiced infanticide and kappa is mentioned by citing Jolivet. Cf. also connection they make between "dish" and infant's fontanel.)

=== Bowl or hat origins of dish ===
Regarding the head dish, folklorist Shinobu Orikuchi's monograph Kappa no hanashi (1930) delves into the possibility that the kappa's head-dish may have its origins in the Ta-no-Kami ("rice paddy deity") wearing a conical kasa type hat. Scholar Masahide Takasaki (1962) (who was mentored by Orikuchi) extrapolated that if the head covering was the god's umbrella-hat, then the kappa's shell (carapace) must also represent the otherworldly god's mino-type straw cape.

Orikuchi's exposition in attempting to argue this point, which is rather a train of thought, is as follows: He first makes comparison with the kappa's head-dish and the folklore about "bowl-lending" (wan-gashi), where leaving a note at a certain river-pool or mound causes the necessary number of bowls to be produced on a loan, and since the pool or mound in question is often said to be connected to the Ryūgū ("Dragon Palace" of the sea god), this must be water deity related lore. (Note: As Orikuchi, indicates, lore on the bowl-lending pool has been described by Kunio Yangita,) A motif within the bowl-lending is that the correct number must be returned, or the blessing will ceased to be given. Orikuchi relates this to dish-counting in children's songs, and the episode of a woman's voice counting of dishes at the well in the famous Sarayashiki ("Dish mansion") ghost story. Orikuchi relates this well with the tradition of steeping virgins in mud to propitiate a bountiful rice harvest, which some have believed must have once been human sacrifice rituals, but Orikuchi believed rather to have been a ritual of giving away a woman as bride to the water deity, possibly to be some sort of shrine servant. (Note: As for brides, note that Orikuchi here also introduces tales of humans marrying kappa, which he collected on Iki Island. Cf. § Nagasaki Prefecture.)

Orikuchi also brings up the example of the Hachikazuki ("Bowl-bearer princess") which is part of the Otogi-zōshi repertoire, opining that such a bowl when expanded into a wider-brimmed hat, can conceivably be like the water deities kasa-hat, or so summarized by Takahashi, as above. Takahashi in another piece of writing (1939) writes that if one were to pose the question 'What is the kappa's head-dish?' the answer must lie with the Nabe kanmuri matsuri or "Pot-Wearing/Crowning Festival" of Maibara, Shiga, and with the "bowl-lending pool" folklore.

Elsewhere, sociologist Muriel Jolivet (2000) has suggested that since the kappa may be connected to population-control infanticide, the water-retaining depression on its head may have been inspired by the soft fontanelle spot on a newborn's head.

=== Wildcat type as migratory legend ===
Kyōgoku and Tada (2000) observes some kappa fall into the wildcat-type category. They note that in the lore of Tsushima Island kappa is known either as kawatora ('"river tiger") or kaōra (川童/カオーラ) which do not have the looks of the local Tsushima leopard cat, but shares the wildcat's behavior. The authors also note that in the Korean language "river tiger" would sound just like kaōra (possibly gahorang[?], McCune–Reischauer: kahorang, 가호랑). (Note: Assuming ka- prefix is correct, it is unclear what word this is. In Korean, "可" is pronounced "ga" (McCune–Reischauer: "ka") but "河" for river is "ha". Another word for river is gang (Korean: 강; Hanja: 江, which forms the compound gangga (McCune–Reischauer: kangka; 강가) meaning "riverside". And horang (호랑) means "tiger and wolf", from which derives horangi (호랑이), an emphatic term for "tiger".)

==== Conflation with kasha ====
Kyōgoku and Tada's older collaboration (2000) also discusses the "kasha type", where they discuss the possible conflation between the kasha, which was a dead body-snatching cat-type yōkai, and therefore comparable to some types of kappa (which also abducted humans). The comparison is already made by Orikuchi (1930), who cited Minakata Kumagusu's observation even earlier, that Wakayama Prefecture's local alias for kappa, the kashanbo, probably derives from some sort of association with the kasha yōkai. (Note: Orikuchi (1930); repr. Orikuchi (1966), p.297.)

=== Suiko as Chinese name ===
During the Edo period in Japan, numerous treatises appeared which referred to the kappa as suiko (水虎; lit. "water-tiger"), a mythical semi-aquatic called shuihu by the Chinese in their older natural history literature. Equating these creatures effectively means they are seen as having a common origin, though there have been notable dissenting opinions on this.

An early example is the physician Kurokawa Dōyū's Enpekikenki (遠碧軒記; 1675), which glossed the water-tiger as kawatarō.

Dissident opinion was given in the encyclopedia Wakan sansai zue (pub. 1712) which decided the two creatures were different and discussed the Japanese kawatarō (i.e. kappa) and the Chinese suiko/shuihu as separate entries. However the Shogen jikō setsuyōshū (書言字考節用集; pub. 1717) that appeared only a few years after came to the conclusion that the Chinese suiko and the Japanese kappa were one and the same, (Note: Its entry appears as "水虎 (カハワツハ)", i.e., written in kanji as suiko, but the furigana given as kawawappa.) even though like the Wakan sansai zue it was built largely on the work of the Chinese pharmacopeia, Bencao gangmu.

There is a whole family of illustrated treatise on the kappa that bears the name suiko in their titles, which drew from early versions and built on them. They bear such titles as Suiko setsu (水虎説; lit. "Discourse on the Suiko"),Suiko kōryaku (水虎考略; lit. "A brief consideration of kappa", 1820), (Note: Foster (2024), p. 203, Fig. 31 renders this as "About suiko", but this is most inconvenient for the purpose of distinguishing similar titles.) Suiko kōryaku kōhen (水虎考略後編; "Sequel to a brief consideration of kappa"), and the single-sheet print Suiko kōryaku (水虎十弐品之図; "Illustration of twelve different types of suiko"). (Note: The interrelationships between these suiko/kappa codices as copies of each other and the shifts and changes in contente were the subject of Teiri Nakamura's study (Nakamura (1996), pp. 374–375).) (Note: Foster (2024), p. 203, Fig. 31 touches on the fact that the "twelve different types" sheet was based on the Suiko kōryaku.) Their chronology (Note: Nakamura's study emphasizes that the Kappa kikiawase (河童聞合; lit. "collected hearings" or "inquiries on the kappa", c. 1805) There were instructions attached to submit the report with color. Thus the 6 or 7 of the illustrations in Suiko kōryaku are determined to be copies from kikiawase by Nakamura.) and content will be discussed below under § Iconography.

In another example, Yanagiwara Motomitsu's Kansō jigo (閑窓自語; pub. Kansei 5–9/1793–1797), gives the headline as "Talk on the Ōmi Province suiko, Talk on the Hizen Province suiko" (Note: Japanese: 「近江水虎語・肥前水虎語」.) but the word suiko is not actually used in the underlying passages. In the Ōmi Province (Lake Biwa) anecdote, the lake monster's name is kawara, (Note: Cf. under § Shiga Prefecture) and in the Hizen Province episode from Kyūshū, the creature is kawatarō. Yet another example is the antiquary Yamazaki Yoshishige's Sanyō zakki (三養雑記; 1839) (Note: Sanyō zakki 三養雑記 31 (extract), in: Kōbunko 廣文庫: "水虎、俗に河太郎、またかつぱといふ... [Suiko, colloquially called kawatarō, also called kappa]".)

As aforementioned, suiko remains in colloquial usage as an alias of kappa in certain areas of the Tōhoku region and Kyūshū (e.g., the Osuiko-sama (お水虎様) of Aomori Prefecture).

The kappa has also been equated with another mythical amphibian from Chinese literature, called the suiin (水蝹/すいいん), mentioned in such works as the Youming lu ("Records of the Dead and the Living"). In Naomi Ryū (直海龍)'s Kō yamato honzō (広倭本草/広大和本草) (pub. Hōreki 9/1759), equates this suiin with the Japanese kawaro or gawatarō, while further down also equates the suiin with the water tiger (suiko).

== Mummies ==
Purported mummies and bones of kappa as yōkai relics are held by various possessors. (Note: īkura (2014), pp. 211–246 apud Hirota (2021).)

Writer Naoki Yamaguchi knows of three whole-bodied mummies purported to be owned in Japan, and which still exist: one is the mummy passed down the family of the Matsuuraichi sake brewery in Imari, Saga. Another piece was obtained by a misemono traveling show that operated around the Tokyo area, another held by Zuiryū-ji temple in Osaka. Besides these, Myōden-ji (妙伝寺) temple in Mashiko possesses an alleged kappa mummy. (Note: An elderly woman residing in what was formerly Sakamoto village in Yatsushiro District, Kumamoto claims to own one, which is not allowed to leave the premise.) (Note: Some books mention the mummy of Akashi, but this is just the head portion, and N. Yamaguchi calls it a "kappa face". It is held by the Akashi City Museum of Culture but it was trapped in a fisherman's net off of the Oki Islands (administrated by Shimane Prefecture), and it may merely be a piece of whale vertebra.)

The reclining kappa mummy owned by the Tajiri (田尻) family of the Matsuuraichi brewery in Imari has been examined by a primatologist (Note: Professor Hisanori Fujii 藤井尚教 of Shokei College) who counted 16 thoracic vertebrae, which didn't match humans or apes (with 12), so even supposing this was made from mammalian skeleton, it would be difficult to pin down what animal.

The traveling show mummy was considered prime exhibit material (mabuneta) by a previous impresario who handed it down to the present owner. The attached story was that the kappa haunted Ayame Pond around what has now become developed as Ayameike Station in Nara, Nara city. It allegedly was caught by villagers after assaulting horses and children, bound by the hands and feet and left to dry in the sun, and thus mummified. The local temple housed it, the story goes, but the temple became derelict, and the item was stolen and trafficked after World War II. There is some wear and tear since it was used in exhibit for 60 years, and currently kept out of public viewing for conservation purposes.

While there were mermaid mummy and kappa mummy craftsmen during the Edo Period, not much about them is known beyond their existence. (Note: However, J. F. van Overmeer Fisscher provides some testimony about workshop[s] in Nagasaki that made all sorts of mummies, at the going price of 30 taels (30 ryō) equivalent to 60 Dutch guilders (cf. Feejee mermaid)))

At the Kitano Tenmangū (Note: Japanese: 北野天満宮, in Kurume, Fukuoka, aforementioned.) of Kurume, Fukuoka, there is a mummified piece alleged to be the hand of a kahaku. The attached story is that in the year 901 when Sugawara no Michizane was nearly assassinated by Chikugo River, a kappa boss tried to help him and got his hand cut off. According to a variant, Michizane himself cut off the hand from the kappa that tried to drag Michizane's horse.

== In popular culture ==
The kappa is a popular creature of the Japanese folk imagination; its manifestations cut across genre lines, appearing in folk religion, beliefs, legends, folktales and folk metaphors.

Ryūnosuke Akutagawa's 1927 novella Kappa centers on a man who got lost and ended up in the land of the kappa near Mount Hotakadake. The story heavily focuses on the subject of suicide and Akutagawa killed himself the year the work was published.

The 1950s cartoon series such as Kappa tengoku by Kon Shimizu was already discussed above.

In Japan, the character Sagojō (Sha Wujing) is conventionally depicted as a kappa, he being a comrade of the magic monkey Son Gokū (Sun Wukong) in the Chinese story Journey to the West.

Kappas are a recurring image in David Peace's 2018 novel Patient X, itself about the life and work of Akutagawa.

Nitori Kawashiro, a character of the Touhou Project is a Kappa.

"Kapp'n", a character appearing in the Animal Crossing series, is a Kappa, alongside his relatives who also appear throughout the series.

Kappa also feature in the Harry Potter series, and are mentioned in the book Fantastic Beasts and Where to Find Them.

The Kappa is one of the more prominent figures from Japanese mythology which has been adapted into roleplaying game settings inspired by Asian cultures, such as Dungeons & Dragons' Kara-Tur.

== Public installations ==
=== Mizuki Shigeru Road ===
External image
- Bronze statues of two kappa facing each other, Mizuki Shigeru Road

The Mizuki Shigeru Road in Sakaiminato, Tottori is lined with bronzes of yōkai after the character designs of manga artist Shigeru Mizuki, including the kappa.

=== Gatarō of Fukusaki ===
External image
- park Sep 2018 2.JPG Kawajirō and two kappa painted figures emerging from pond, Tsujikawayama Park

The township of Fukusaki, Hyōgo (birthplace of folklorist Yanagita Kunio has installed a number of yōkai statures or figures all over town. including several kappa. Drawing from Yangita's writings, the town has developed as mascot two fictional brothers named Kawatarō and Kawajirō. The Kawajirō is installed both near the station and submerged in the pond at Tsujikawayama Park alongside two baby kappa, and they emerge out of water periodically. The figures were designed by Tomoo Ogawa who was a staff at the town's Regional Promotional Division.

=== Iconic uses ===
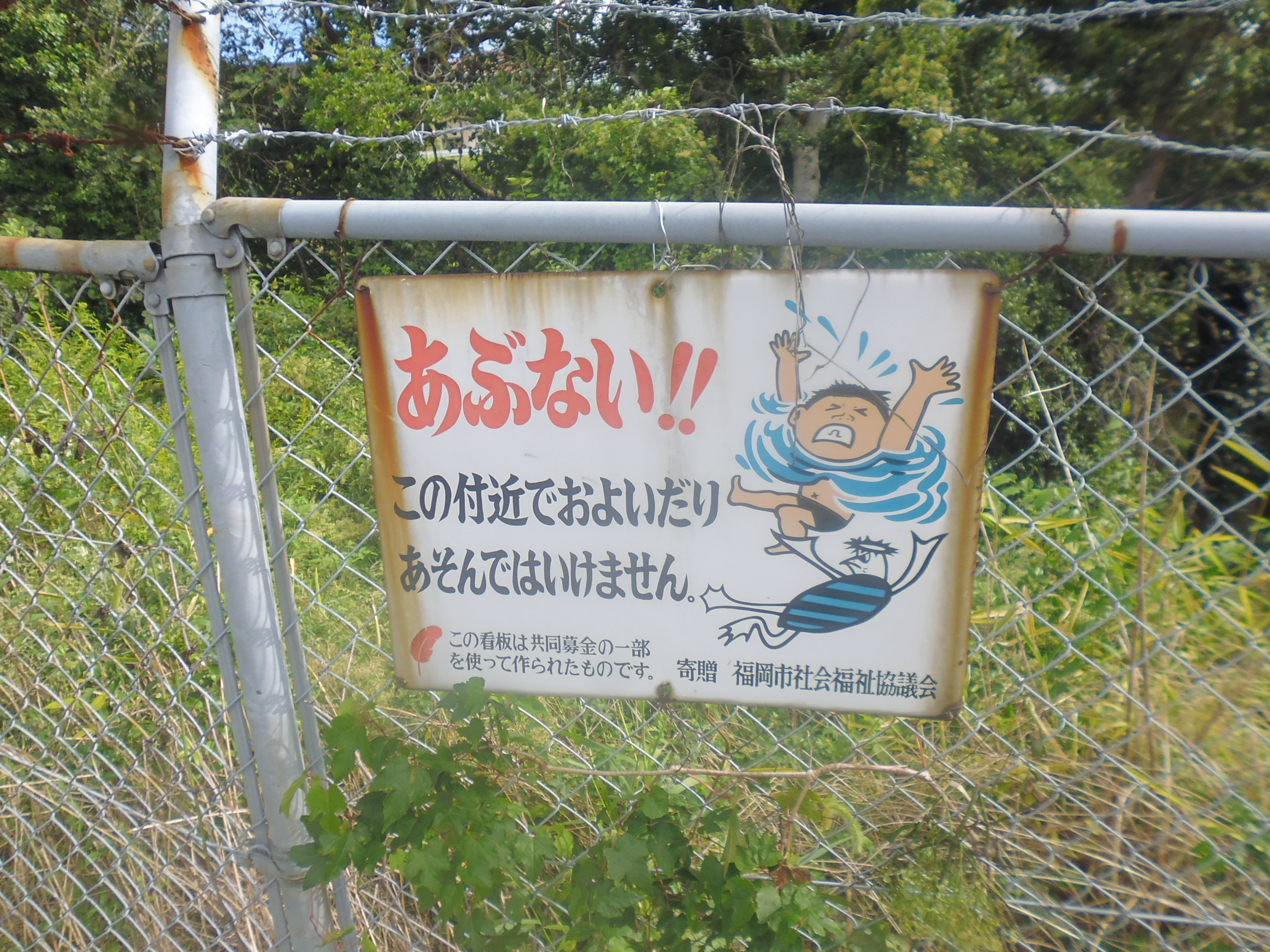
"DANGER!! Do not swim or play around here." A kappa is depicted as a metaphor of drowning on a sign near a pond in Fukuoka.

Even today, warning signs about the kappa appearing near bodies of water are seen in some Japanese towns and villages. However, such signs often merely serve as scary warnings to dissuade young children from playing too close to rivers, ponds, etc.

=== Commercial advertising ===
Major sake brewery Kizakura's mascot has been the kappa and its family, the first version undertaken by Kon Shimizu, and the second version taken over by Kō Kojima, (Note: Papp (2010), pp. 16–17 and Fig. 2.4 ""the gender roles.. have hardly changed since the early fifities from pouring saké for the husband.. the female kappa is naked.. displaying very strong eroticism".) which were viewed widely as TV commercials from around 1955.

Bank of Tokyo-Mitsubishi's DC Card (a credit card) uses the DC Card Kappa, a cuddly cartoon character, as mascot.

=== Anime and games ===
- In the anime show Inuyasha, a kappa, Sha Gojyo(Sagojō)'s descendant said to be a descendant of the legendary character from Journey of the West and together with Son Gokū's descendant, the servant of Chokyūkai to find a bride.
- Kagome's grandfather gave her an alleged mummified foot of a kappa for her early 15th birthday, but she does not accept it and gives it to Buyo.
- In episode 4 of Yashahime: Princess Half-Demon, Grandpa Higurashi gifted to his great-granddaughter, Moroha, a mummified kappa's foot as a gift, which she accepts and keeps.
- In the Touhou Project video game Mountain of Faith, the stage 3 boss is a kappa named Nitori Kawashiro.
  - Kappas appear several times in official manga works of the Touhou Project. They are depicted as technologically advanced inventors.

Kappa, and creatures based on them, are recurring characters in Japanese tokusatsu films and television shows. Examples include the kappas in the Daiei/Kadokawa series Yokai Monsters, the 2010 kaiju film Death Kappa, and "King Kappa", a kaiju from the 1972 Tsuburaya Productions series Ultraman Ace.

- Summer Days with Coo is a 2007 Japanese animated film about a kappa and its impact on an ordinary family, written for the screen and directed by Keiichi Hara based on two novels by Masao Kogure.
- In Teenage Mutant Ninja Turtles III, the titular Turtles accidentally activate the Time Scepter, a mystical artifact, and end up travelling back in time, to Japan of the Edo period (more specifically 1603). As a running gag, some of the villagers who interact with them feel frightened by their appearance and refer to them as the legendary "kappa" throughout the film. Notably, the Turtles quickly befriend children in the village, and Leonardo demonstrates for them the modern medical technique of CPR to save a boy's life.
- In One Piece, the character Kawamatsu is often mistaken for a kappa due to his appearance and strong swimming ability. Although he is actually a fish-man, several characters within the Wano Country arc refer to him as a kappa, and the series uses this misunderstanding as a recurring comedic motif.

== Eponymy ==
A cucumber-filled makizushi (sushi roll) is known as a kappamaki.

It is said that the company president of Calbee liked kappa, so he wanted the name "Kappa" to be included in one of his products. That brought about Kappa Ebisen, a popular shrimp-flavored snack in Japan.

The kappa tick (Amblyomma kappa) is a native Japanese arachnid which occurs in the southern Ryukyu Islands and was named due to its association with reptilian hosts, particularly turtles (which share some physical similarities with the kappa).

== See also ==
- Kappa, a novel by Ryūnosuke Akutagawa
- Kappabashi-dori, a Tokyo street named after the kappa
- Kijimuna, a spirit creature from Okinawa
- Kuzenbo, the king of kappa in Japanese mythology
- Mintuci, a water spirit from Ainu mythology
- Neck, a shapeshifting water spirit in Germanic mythology and folklore
- Bukavac, a similar creature in Balkan mythology
- Siyokoy (Philippine mythology) – Philippine mythical creature
