= Kuzenbo =

Japanese mythological figure

- King of kappa
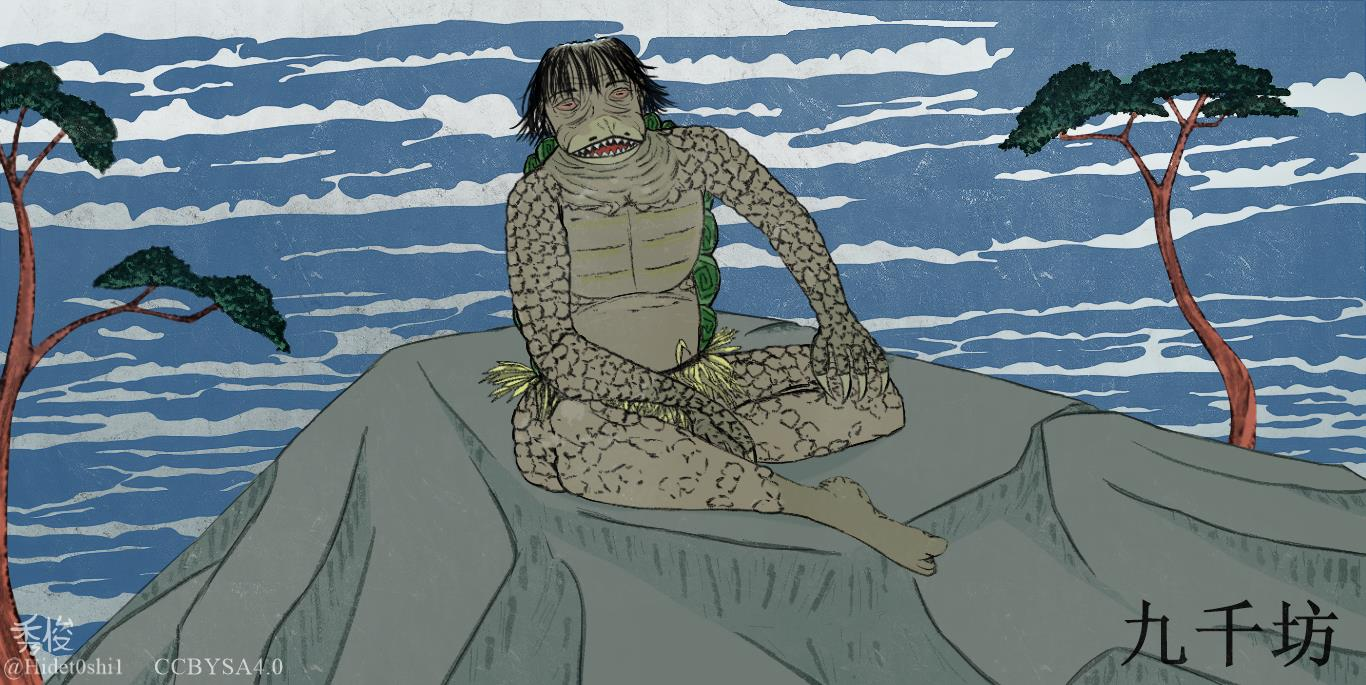
- A modern illustration of Kuzenbo
- Other names: Kusenbo; Kyusenbo

Kuzenbo (Japanese: 九千坊), also spelled as Kusenbo and Kyusenbo, is the king of kappa in Japanese mythology. He lives in Chikugo River.

== Mythology ==
A legend from Tanushimaru, Fukuoka says that a local river is where all kappa originate. A clan of kappa once lived in the Yellow River in China, but migrated to Kuma River. The kappa clan had over nine-thousand members, and was called the Kuzenbo clan, which was also the name of their leader. Katō Kiyomasa recruited the help of local monkeys, which are the enemies of kappa, to defeat the king Kuzenbo and his clan.

Another legend, told through kamishibai, tells how Kuzenbo, imprisoned in a mountain, was blasted all the way to the Deccan Plateau in India after the mountain he was stuck in was struck by lightning. After the imprisonment of Kuzenbo, Sha Wujing emerged from the Yellow River in China. A great battle between the mountain kappa, led by Kuzenbo, and the river kappa, led by Sha Wujing, took place in the Taklamakan Desert. Sha Wujing and Kuzenbo decided to compare their strength by lifting megaliths. It was a close competition, but Sha Wujing finally surrendered when Kuzenbo lifted a megalith that weighed nine-thousand tons and threw it very far, which was a feat he could not match. With Sha Wujing having surrendered, Kuzenbo became the leader of the river and mountain kappa, making him the leader of all kappa in the world. The clan of kappa travelled along the Silk Road through China and Korea and eventually came to Japan. Kuzenbo had nine thousand of his kappa travel all around Japan and settle in every river in the country. He was able to watch them all from atop the mountain Kuzenbuyama.
