= Shokei College =

Private university in Kunamoto, Kunamoto, Japan

Coordinates: 32°47′52.5″N 130°43′1.3″E

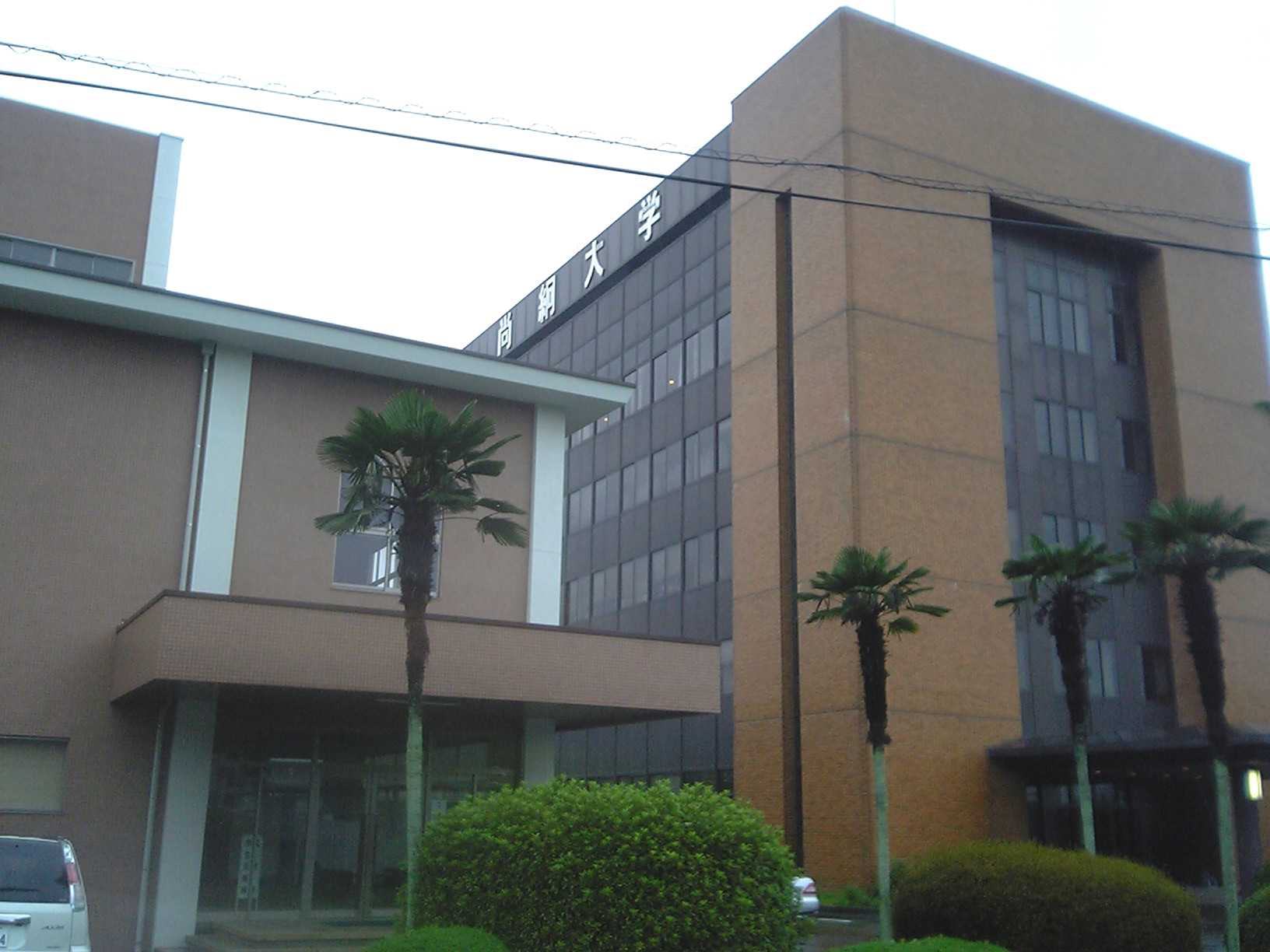
Shokei College

Shokei College (尚絅大学, Shōkei daigaku) is a private university in Kumamoto, Kumamoto, Japan. The predecessor of the school, small girls' school, was founded in 1888, and it was chartered as a junior women's college in 1952. In 1975, Shokei University was established and the junior women's college was renamed to Shokei Junior College. In 2006, the two schools merged.
