= Kagakushū =

1444 Japanese dictionary of Chinese characters

The Kagakushū (下学集; "Collection of Low/Mundane Studies"), alternatively read as Gegakushū, was a 1444 Japanese dictionary of Chinese characters arranged into semantic headings. The title alludes to Confucius' self-description in the Lunyu "下学而上達" ("My studies lie low, and my penetration rises high.")

The Kagakushū's colophon is dated 1444 CE, but does not name the dictionary's editor except for obscurely mentioning Tōroku Hanō (東麓破衲 "East-foothills Torn-robes"; possibly Hadō). Scholars presume this was a Muromachi Period Buddhist priest because Tōroku is a variant name for Tōzan (東山 "East Mountain"), which is the location of Kennin-ji (建仁寺), the head temple of the Sōtō school of Zen.

The Kagakushū was one of the first Japanese dictionaries designed for common people rather than intelligentsia. In the lexicographical evolution of Japanese dictionaries, Nakao explains how

[R]eference books took a significant further step towards Japanese, and the dictionaries, which had been almost exclusively employed by scholars, priests, literati, and the learned minority of the country, consequently reached a wider audience and began to be used as practical guides to reading and writing. Moreover, the developing technology of printing enabled the literate public to obtain handy and practical dictionaries quite cheaply. Kagakushu (1444), produced in two volumes and edited by a monk in Kyoto, was a sort of Japanese language dictionary with encyclopedic information. It served as a textbook on Chinese characters and was reissued many times, each time with further additions.

This anonymous Japanese dictionary, in two fascicles (kan 卷 "scroll; volume"), defines some 3000 words. Head entries in the Jikyōshū give the kanji, Japanese readings in katakana to the right, definition, usage notes, and occasionally etymology. Collation for the entries involves 18 semantic headings, as shown below.

Classified headings in the Kagakushū
Heading	Rōmaji	Kanji	Subject
1	Tenchi	天地	nature
2	Jisetsu	時節	seasons
3	Jingi	神祇	Shintō deities
4	Jinrin	人倫	human relations
5	Kan'i	官位	offices and ranks
6	Jinmei	人名	names of people
7	Kaoku	家屋	buildings
8	Kikei	気形	creatures
9	Shitai	支体	anatomy
10	Taigei	態芸	art and form
11	Kenpu	絹布	cloth
12	Inshoku	飲食	foods and drinks
13	Kizai	器材	utensils
14	Sōmoku	草木	plants
15	Saishiki	彩色	colors
16	Sūryō	数量	weights and measures
17	Genji	言辞	miscellaneous words
18	Jōji	畳字	synonym compounds

Compared with the semantic categorizations in earlier Japanese dictionaries such as the Wamyō Ruijushō or Iroha Jiruishō, these simplified 18 in the Kagakushū are easier to understand.

Many Kagakushū editions have an appendix entitled Tenkaku-shōji (点画小異字 "characters differing only by one stroke") that lists pairs like ya 冶 "smelt; cast" and chi 治 "govern; regulate".

The origins of the Kagakushū, like the Setsuyōshū, are associated with an early type of Japanese textbook used in Buddhist Terakoya private schools, the ōraimono (往来物, "correspondences; model letter book; copybook"). According to Don Bailey:

The Kagakushū, although only sparsely annotated, was in fact intended to serve as a small encyclopedia and textbook as well as a dictionary; the compiler, apparently realizing that many of the ōrai then in use were too detailed, cumbersome, and tome-like, condensed and abstracted from these texts in order to produce a reference tool containing minimally essential information and Chinese characters. That he succeeded is attested by the fact that over thirty copies of the Kagakushū have survived from the Muromachi period alone.
