= Keyamura Rokusuke =

Fictional samurai in bunraku and kabuki play

Keyamura Rokusuke (毛谷村 六助), also known as Kida Magobee (貴田 孫兵衛), is one of the leading characters in the ningyō jōruri and kabuki play Hiko-san Gongen chikai no sukedachi (彦山権現誓助劔) and in some other plays. The farmer turned samurai is known for his filial piety and incredible strength, and is viewed as an ideal samurai.

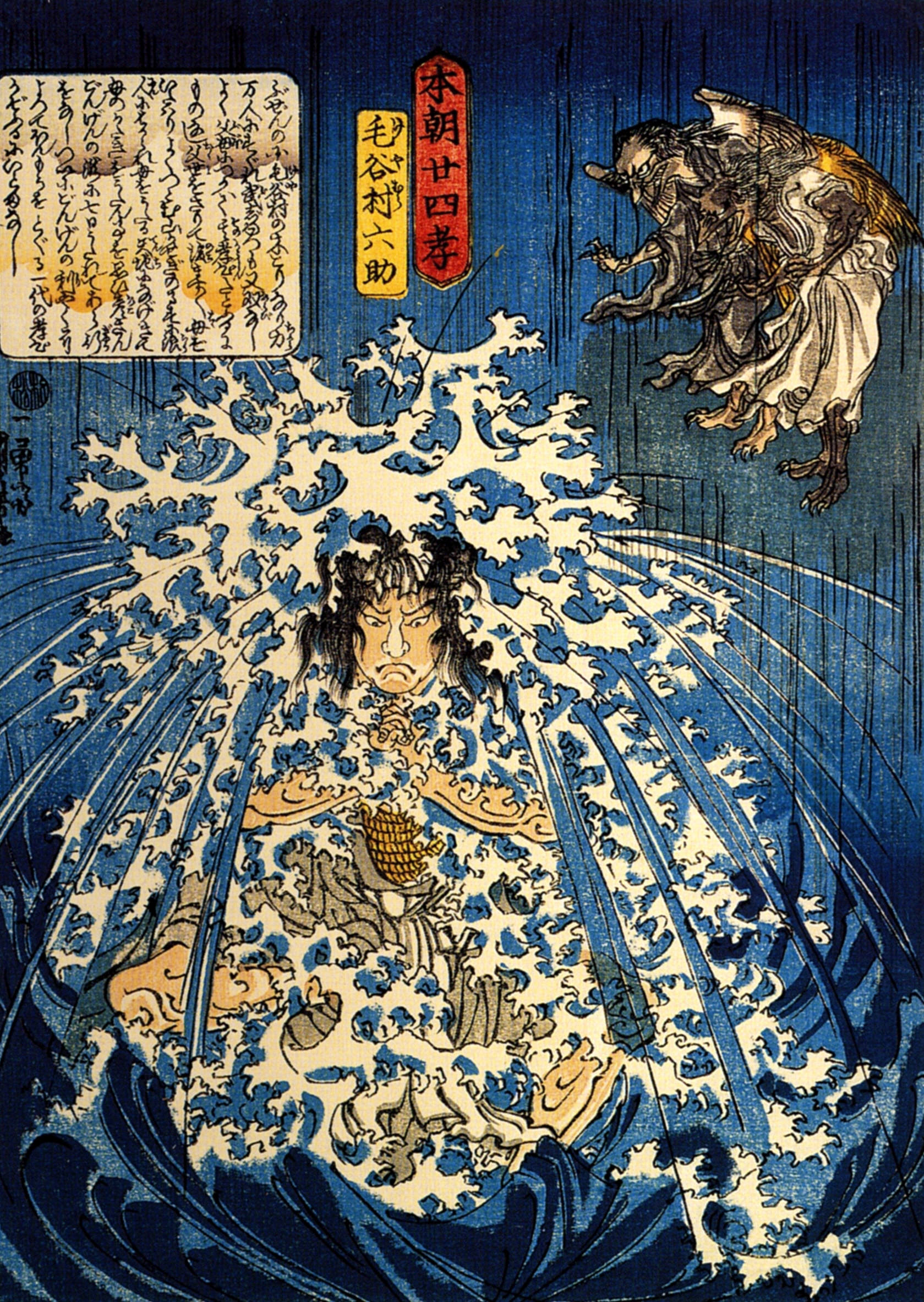
Keyamura Rokusuke by Utagawa Kuniyoshi.

== Plot ==
Written by Tsugano Kafū and Chikamtsu Yasuzō, the Hiko-san Gongen chikai no sukedachi was first performed as a ningyō jōruri play in 1786. It gained popularity and was adopted as a kabuki play in the next year. The story was set in the Azuchi-Momoyama period, when Toyotomi Hideyoshi was about to reunify Japan:

Yoshioka Ichimisai, a sword instructor to the Kōri (Mōri) clan, is killed with a sneak attack by Kyōgoku Takumi. His widow, Okō, and daughters, Osono and Okiku, vow to avenge him. However, Okiku is killed by Kyōgoku Takumi and her young son Yasamatsu disappears.

Around the same time, Rokusuke, mourning for his late mother, lives a quiet life as a farmer in a mountainous village named Keya (Keya-mura). Despite his quiet life, he is a skilled swordmaster and was a student of Yoshioka Ichimisai. His skill is so renowned that the local ruler has declared that anyone who defeats Rokusuke will be hired as a sword instructor. Rokusuke is visited by a rōnin named Mijin Danjō, who is actually Kyōgoku Takumi. Holding an elderly woman on his back to elicit sympathy, Mijin Danjō asks Rokusuke to help him become a swordmaster. Rokusuke accepts his request and deliberately loses a match to him.

Upon his return, Rokusuke finds Yasamatsu without knowing that the boy is the grandson of his late teacher. He hangs the boy's kimono outside his house, hoping that his family will see it. He is visited first by an elderly woman and then by a woman disguised as a traveling priest. She sees the kimono and misidentifies Rokusuke as the enemy. After Rokusuke fends off her fierce attack, Yasamatsu identifies her as his aunt Osono. The mannish Osono suddenly becomes very feminine and proposes marriage to Rokusuke, a highlight of the play. The elderly woman then reveals herself as the swordmaster's widow. Later, a woodman visits Rokusuke seeking revenge for the murder of his mother, revealing that the woman brought by Mijin Danjō was the woodman's mother, not Mijin Danjō's. Osono identifies Mijin Danjō as Kyōgoku Takumi, and Rokusuke agrees to help them seek revenge.

Rokusuke, initially refused a match against Mijin Danjō due to his humble status, becomes a retainer of Katō Kiyomasa after demonstrating his incredible power and skills in a series of sumō matches. He is given the name Kida Magobee (貴田孫兵衛). Now a samurai, he challenges Mijin Danjō to a match and successfully defeats him. The play ends with Katō Kiyomasa's departure for the Korean campaign.

== Historical model ==
The historical accuracy of this fiction is unclear. A small village community named Keyamura is located in Tsukinoki, Yamakuni-machi, Nakatsu, Ōita Prefecture. There is a tomb of Kida Magobee (木田孫兵衛), which was built in the Meiji period. There is also an apparently old manuscript about Keyamura Rokusuke that contains the dates of copy of 1716 and 1902. According to the manuscript, Rokusuke was a son of a rōnin and his local wife. He joined Toyotomi Hideyoshi's Korean campaigns and distinguished himself as the unrivaled warrior. He returned to the village and died at the age of 62.

Kida Magobee himself was a real figure. He appeared as a retainer of Katō Kiyomasa in some contemporary sources. The Kiyomasa-ki, a not-so-faithful biography of Katō Kiyomasa written in the mid-17th century, claimed that Kida Magobee was killed in a battle with the Jurchens (Orankai) on the Manchurian border (in 1592). Japanologist Choi Gwan dismissed this claim. His name can be found in a letter written by Katō Kiyomasa about two months after his supposed death. One of the recipients was Kida Magobee himself. The Kida family continued to serve the Hosokawa clan, who replaced the Katō clan as rulers of Kumamoto, until the end of the Edo period.

== New myth in South Korea ==
In South Korea, Keyamura Rokusuke is known as the victim of a suicide attack by Nongae, a kisaeng (official prostitute). However, the identification of the victim as Keyamura Rokusuke can only be traced back to the mid-20th century.

The new myth is as follows:

Following the second siege of Jinju in 1593, Rokusuke was one of many victorious Japanese commanders. That same night the Japanese high command celebrated their victory in Jinju Castle. Rokusuke, who was lured onto a balcony by a kisaeng called Nongae. After Nongae passionately embraced Rokusuke, she toppled backward, taking Rokusuke and herself to their deaths. A shrine to Nonggae stands on this site.

There is no contemporary record of Nongae. Relatively early accounts did not name the victim of her suicide attack. Later, various manuscripts of the Imjillok, a semi-fictitious history book, identify him as Katō Kiyomasa or Toyotomi Hideyoshi, which is obviously incorrect. No contemporary Korean sources suggest that the Koreans recognized the name of Kida Magobee or Keyamura Rokusuke, let alone associated him with the suicide attack.

Choi Gwan claimed that Bak Jonghwa's (朴鍾和) Nongae and Gyewolhyang (1962) was the first to identify the victim as Keyamura Rokusuke. Kawamura Minato discovered a slightly earlier mention of the new myth: a Japanese novel named Keijō, Chinkai and Fuzan (1951) by Tamagawa Ichirō.
