= Sumida Park =

Public park in Tokyo, Japan

Coordinates: 35.7109726°N 139.7986808°E

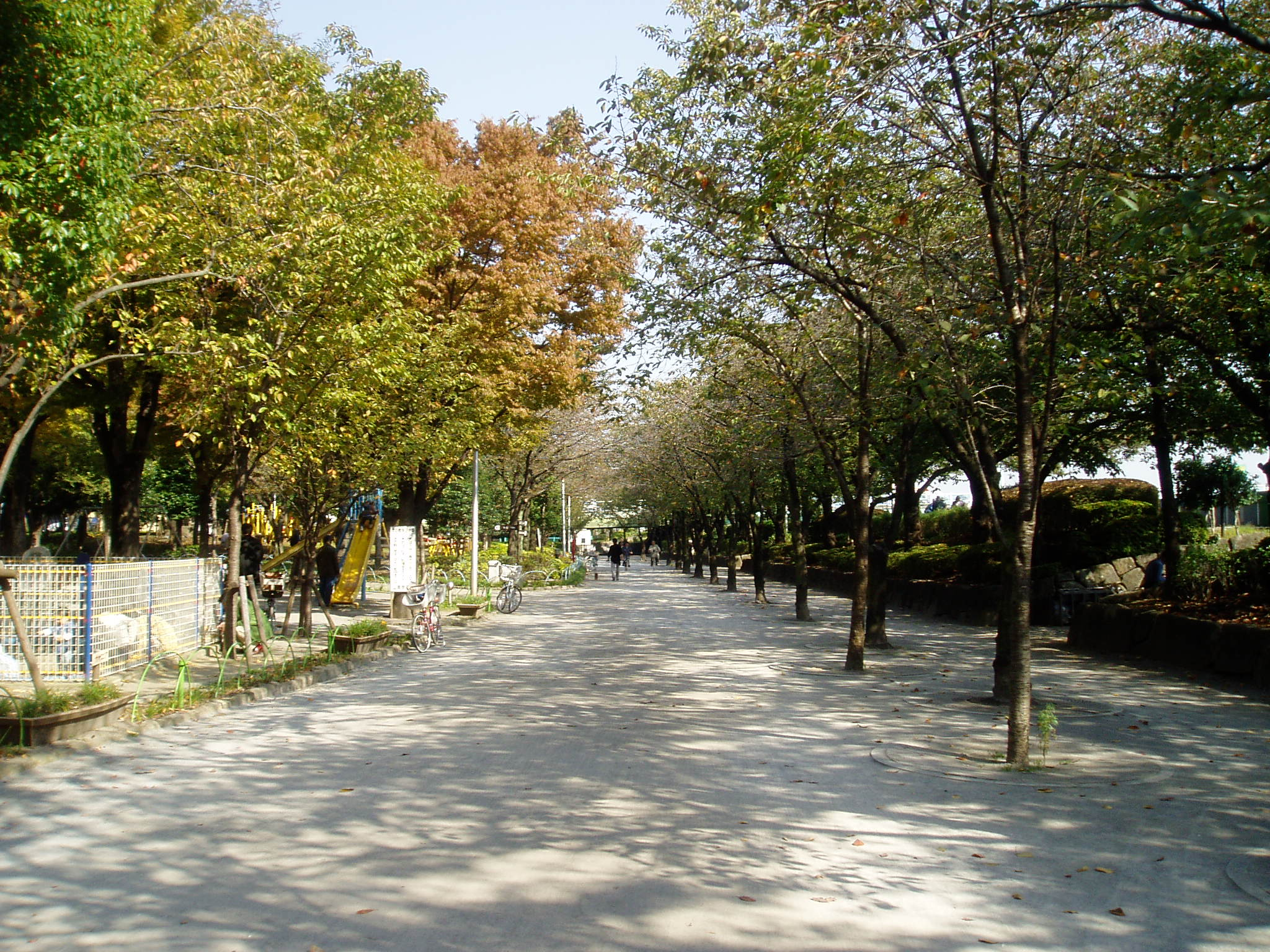
- The park in November
- Interactive map of Sumida Park
- Location: Sumida and Taitō, Tokyo, Japan
- Area: 107,797 square metres (26.637 acres)
- Created: 1931
- Public transit: Asakusa Station

Sumida Park (隅田公園, Sumida Kōen) is a public park in Sumida and Taitō, Tokyo, Japan. Cherry blossoms can be seen in spring, and the Sumidagawa Fireworks Festival is held in July. There are about 700 cherry trees in Sumida Park on both sides of the Sumida River, and they were planted by Tokugawa Yoshimune.

== Gallery ==
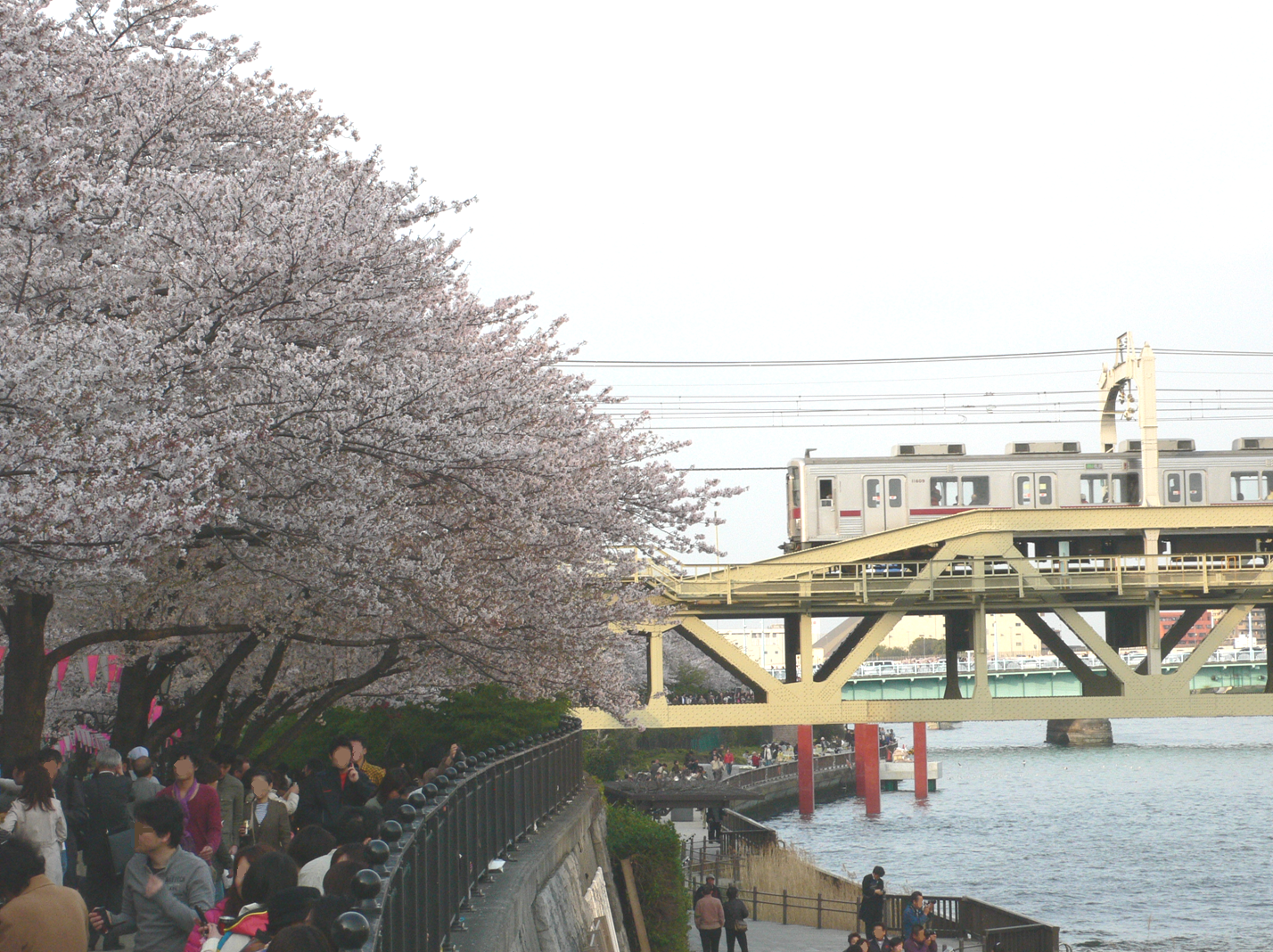
Cherry trees in April

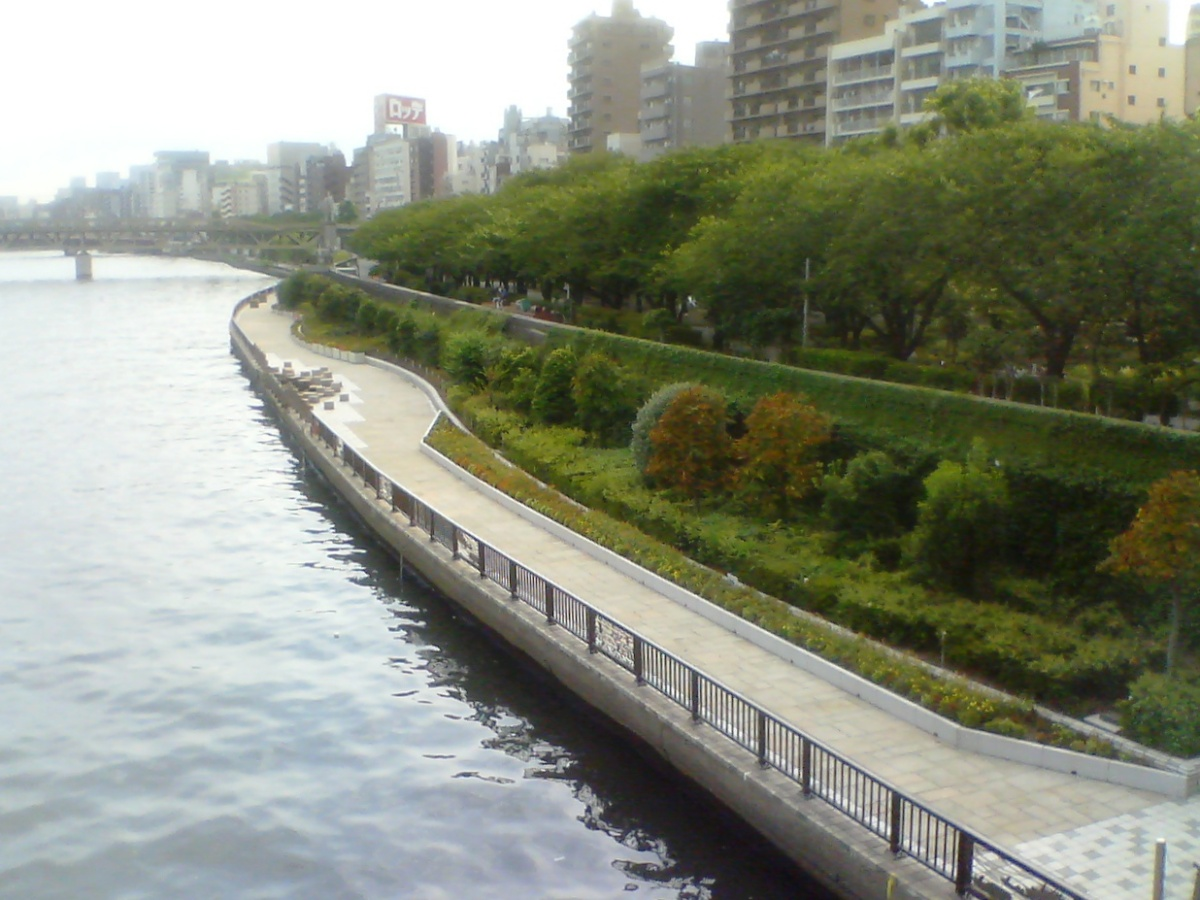
View of the park from top of Kototoi Bridge.

== See also ==
- Parks and gardens in Tokyo
- National Parks of Japan
