= Platinum Pen Company =

Japanese pen manufacturer

Platinum Pen Co., Ltd.
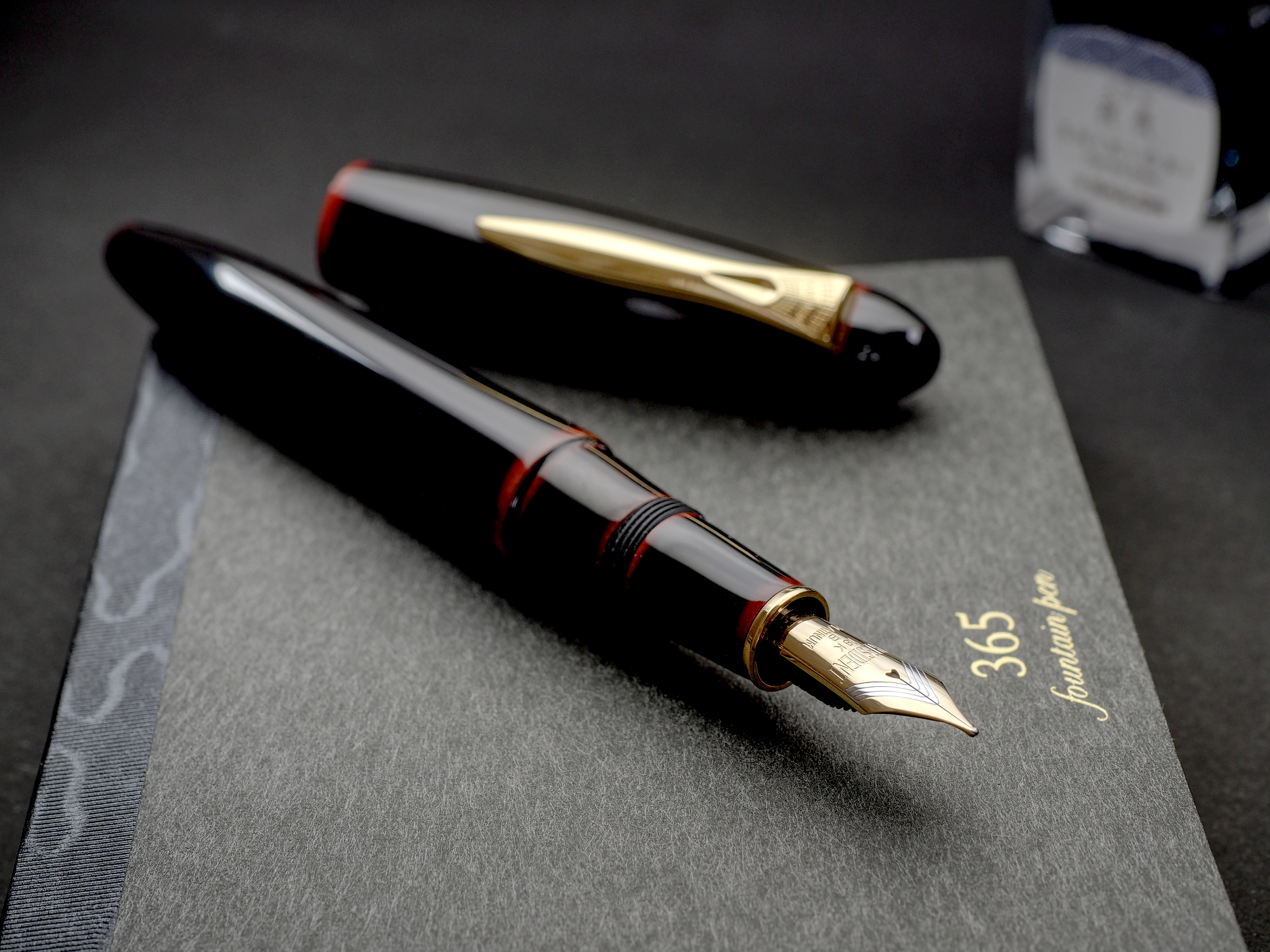
- A Platinum Izumo fountain pen
- Industry: Stationery
- Founded: 1919; 107 years ago
- Founder: Shunichi Nakata
- Headquarters: Taitō, Tokyo, Japan
- Area served: Worldwide
- Products: Writing implements
- Website: platinum-pen.co.jp

Platinum Pen Co., Ltd. (プラチナ万年筆株式会社, Purachina Mannenhitsu Kabushiki-gaisha) is a Japanese pen manufacturer based in Taitō, Tokyo known for the introduction in 1956 of the world's first cartridge type fountain pen, and in 1967 for the first fountain pen with a platinum nib.

== History ==
It was founded by Shunichi Nakata in 1919. In 1924 the business was known as Nakaya Seisakusho and was based in Ueno, Tokyo.

In 1942 the company was primarily focused for the Tokyo Weapons Company involved in the manufacture of fighter planes. The pen business Nakaya Seisakusho was renamed Platinum Fountain Pen Company Ltd. This changed in 1952 to Platinum Industry Company after a challenge from a British company of the same name, but reverted in 1962.

Later the business moved to Taitō, Tokyo, where it remains. Production is in Shanghai, China.

== Products ==
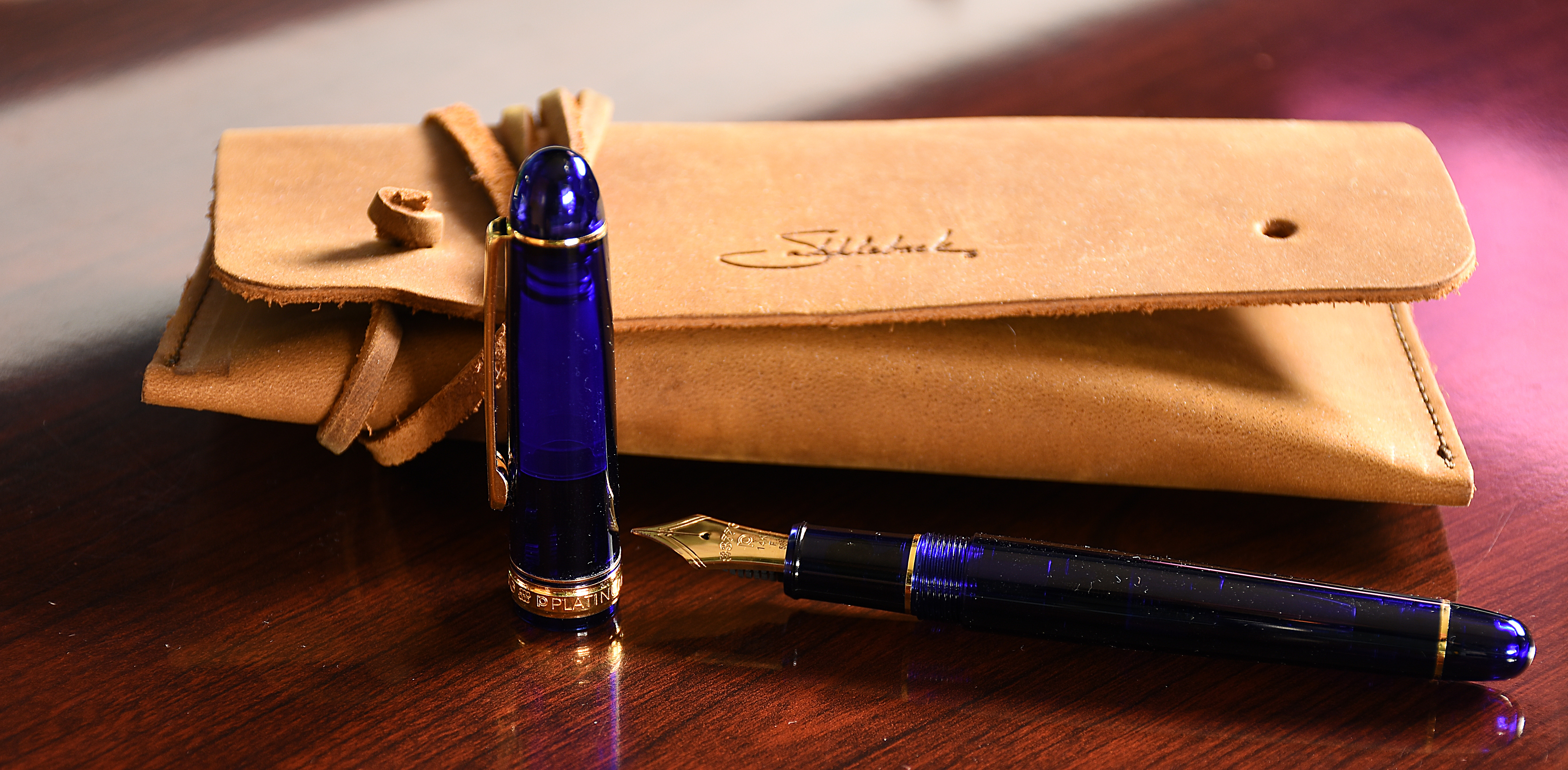
A Platinum 3776 Century pen

=== Fountain pens ===
Platinum's flagship model is the 3776, which launched in 1978. The number is the height in metres of Mount Fuji. The President line launched in 1994, and the Izumo line in 2010.
