= Amuse Museum =

Textile Culture and Ukiyo-e Art Museum – Amuse Museum
- 「布文化と浮世絵の美術館」アミューズミュージアム
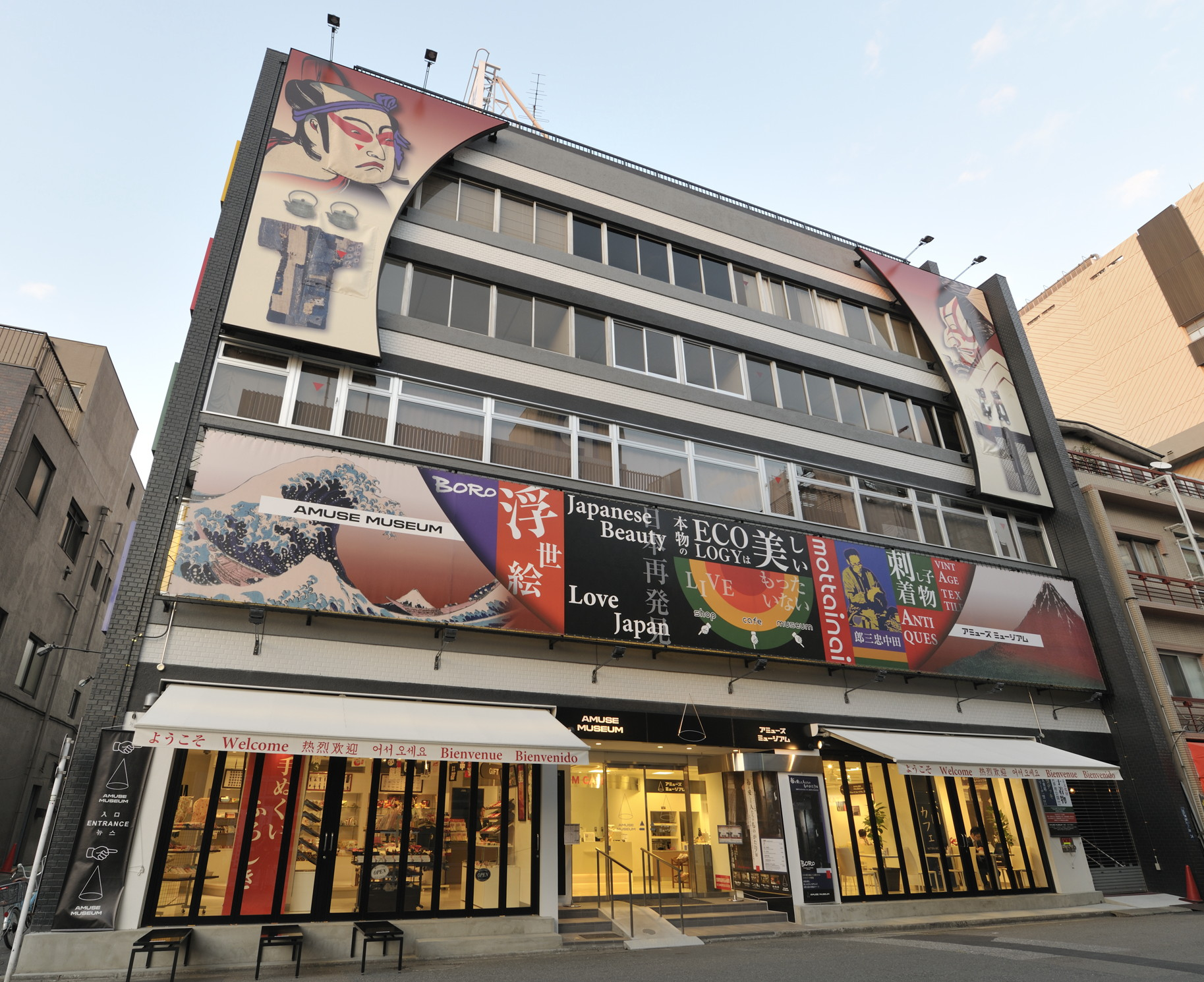
- View of the front of the museum

- Location of Amuse Museum in Japan
- Established: 1 November 2009
- Location: Asakusa, Tokyo, Japan
- Coordinates: 35°42′52.2″N 139°47′52.4″E
- Type: Art museum
- Key holdings: Miracle Textile Art "Boro"
- Curator: Kiyoshi Tatsumi
- Owner: Amuse, Inc.
- Website: Official site (English site)

The Textile Culture and Ukiyo-e Art Museum – Amuse Museum (「布文化と浮世絵の美術館」アミューズミュージアム, Nuno Bunka to Ukiyoe no Bijutsukan Amyūzu Myūjiamu), or simply Amuse Museum, was a private museum specializing in Japanese textile culture and ukiyo-e. It opened on 1 November 2009 in Asakusa, Tokyo, not too far from Ueno Park, where multiple other museums are located. The museum was closed on 31 March 2019.

The museum housed a collection of everyday clothing and other textiles from the private collection of folklorist Chūzaburō Tanaka. While only about 1500 of the items were on display at any time, the museum rotated through the collection every few months.

The talent and entertainment agency Amuse was the owner of the museum.

== General information ==
Amuse Museum was established on 1 November 2009 as a private Japanese textile culture and ukiyo-e museum in the Asakusa district of the Taitō special ward of Tokyo, Japan. It is located just east of Sensō-ji. The museum was operated and owned by the talent and entertainment agency Amuse. The concept of the museum curation, Don't be wasteful (もったいない, Mottainai; lit. "Wasteful"), was based on the environmental and social activism of Nobel Peace Prize winner Wangari Maathai.

The museum's collections were started with over 30,000 everyday clothing items from the collection of the folklorist Chūzaburō Tanaka. Many of the pieces were in disrepair and appeared to be loosely sewn rags. About 1500 of those items were on display at any one time, and the pieces on display were rotated out every few months.

The honorary curator of Amuse Museum was Tanaka, and the Chief Curator was Kiyoshi Tatsumi.

=== Access and environs ===
Amuse Museum was located about 5 minutes' walk north-northwest of Asakusa Station on the Ginza Line and about 8 minutes from Asakusa Station on the Tsukuba Express line. There are two bus stops within a block of the museum's former location. The Asakusa Shrine and Sensō-ji are located just west of the former museum site.

Other nearby attractions within walking distance included Kaminarimon, Kyu-Iwasaki-tei Garden, the National Museum of Nature and Science, the National Museum of Western Art, Tokyo Metropolitan Art Museum, Tokyo National Museum, Ueno Zoo, and Ueno Park (which contains the four museums above, as well as the zoo).

A bar was located on the sixth floor of the museum building offering drinks snack items.

== Exhibit history ==
In 2010, Amuse Museum hosted the "Tsugaru – Nanbu Sashiko Kimono" collection, consisting of 768 pieces of sashiko kimonos from Tsugara and Nanbu in Aomori Prefecture.

Cloth culture is at the heart of this presentation of the handicraft of nameless artisans and ordinary women, the exhibit has been featured in media such as NHK's Bi no Tsubo (美の壷; lit. "The Mark of Beauty") and Shin Nippon Fudoki (新日本風土記; lit. "New Japan Culture").

=== Permanent collection ===
The permanent exhibit was Miracle Textile Art "Boro" (奇跡のテキスタイルアート「BORO」, Kiseki no Tekisutairu Āto "Boro"), based on the donations from Tanaka.

The motifs found in the Boro exhibit inspired fashion designers such as Louis Vuitton, Hiroyuki Horihata, Makiko Sekiguchi, Joseph Altuzarra, and Junya Watanabe. Vuitton incorporated Boro motifs into his 2013 Spring/Summer Paris men's collection, and Altuzarra incorporated them into his 2014 Spring/Summer New York men's collection. Watanabe, a designer for Comme des Garçons, used the motif for his Spring/Summer 2015 collection.
