= Taitō =

Taitō 台東区
- Special ward
- Taitō City
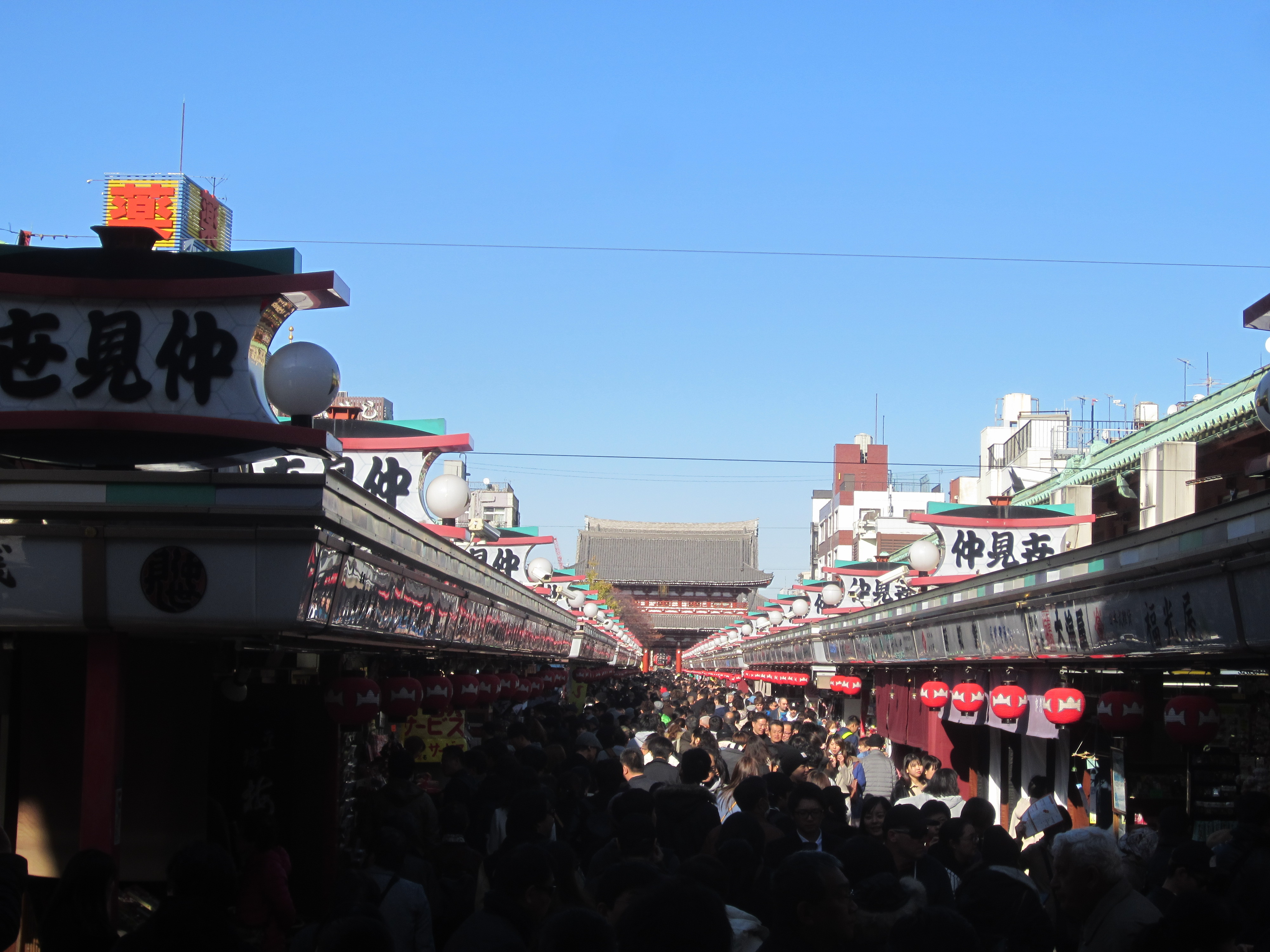
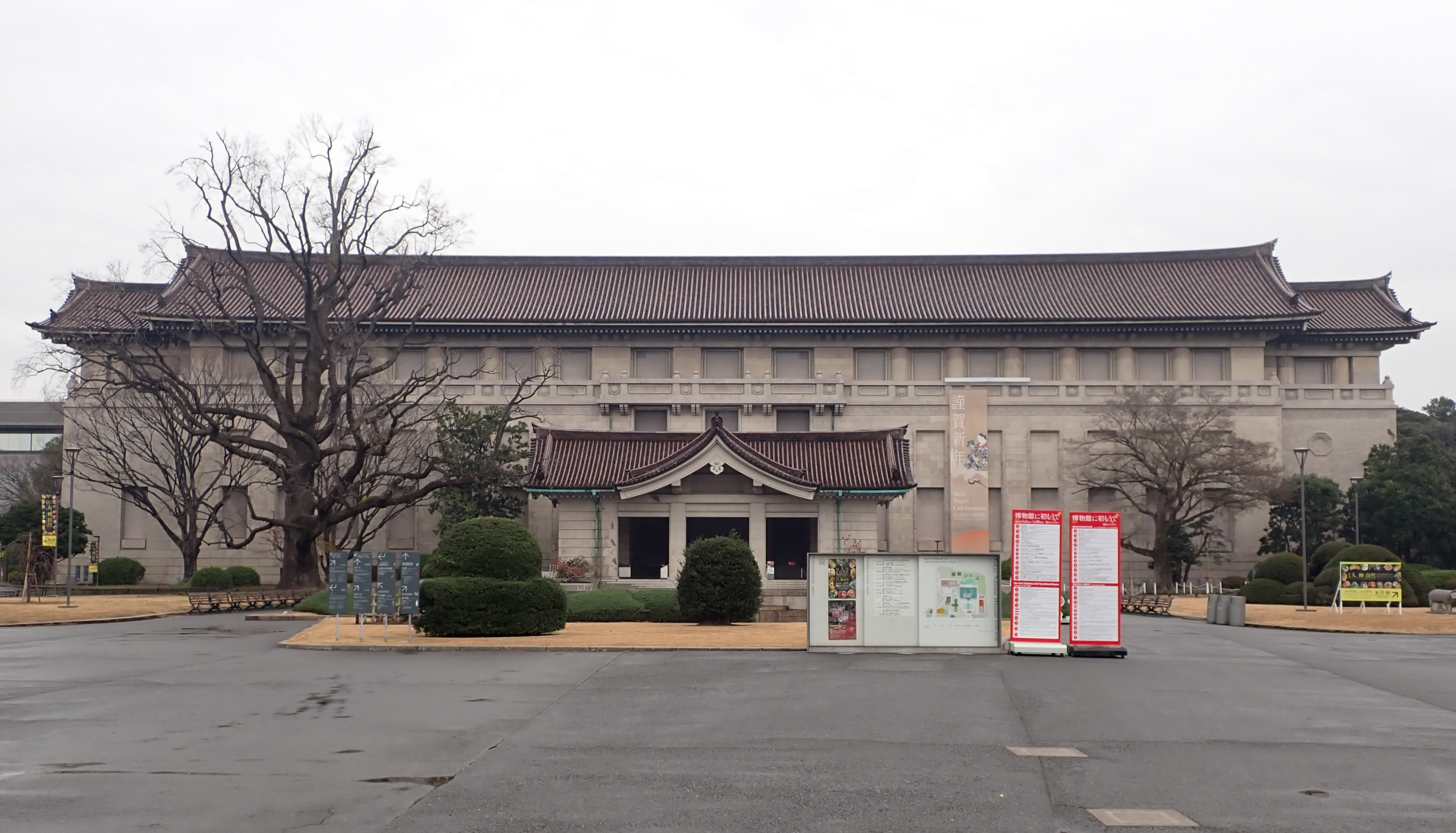
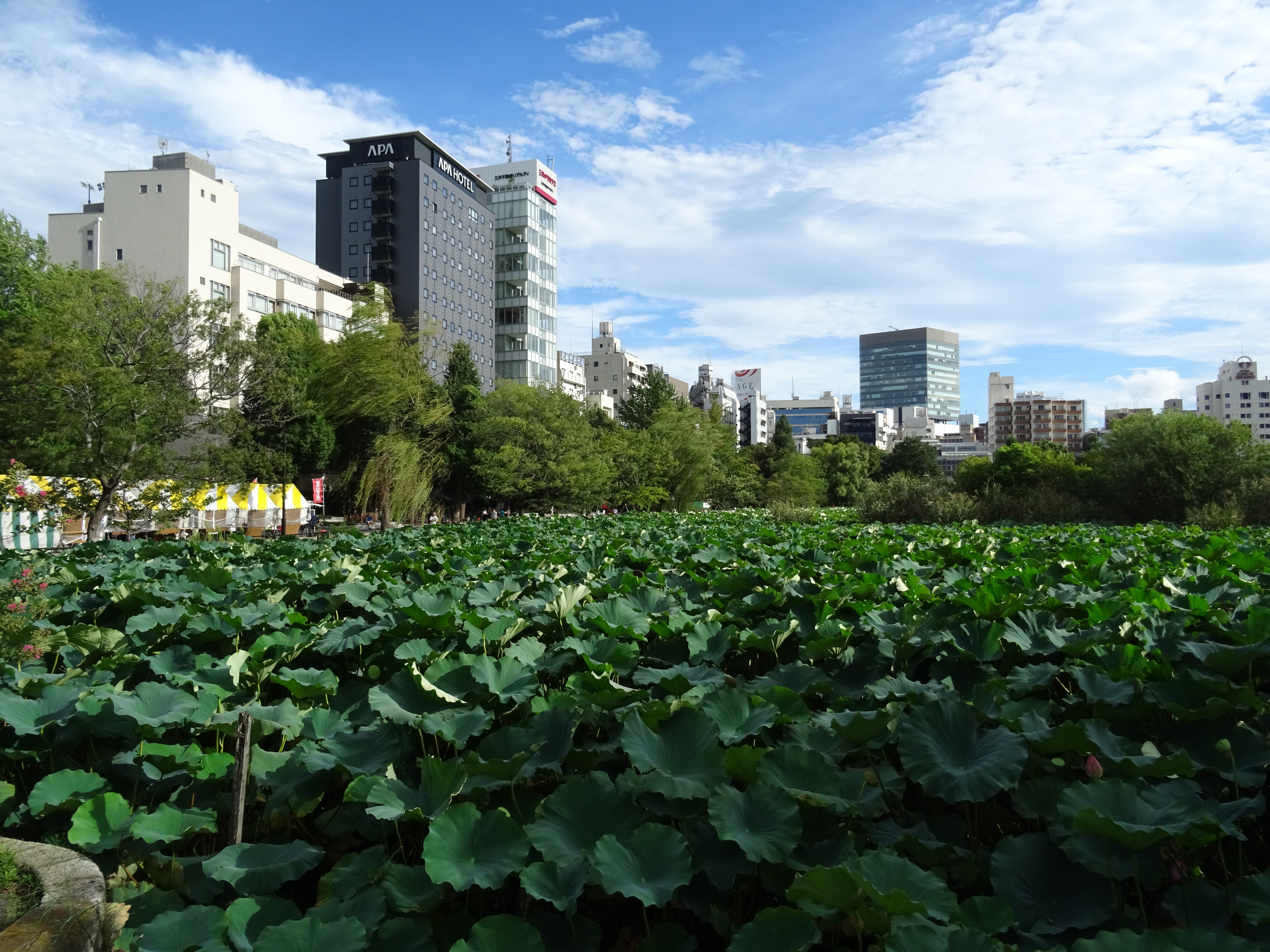
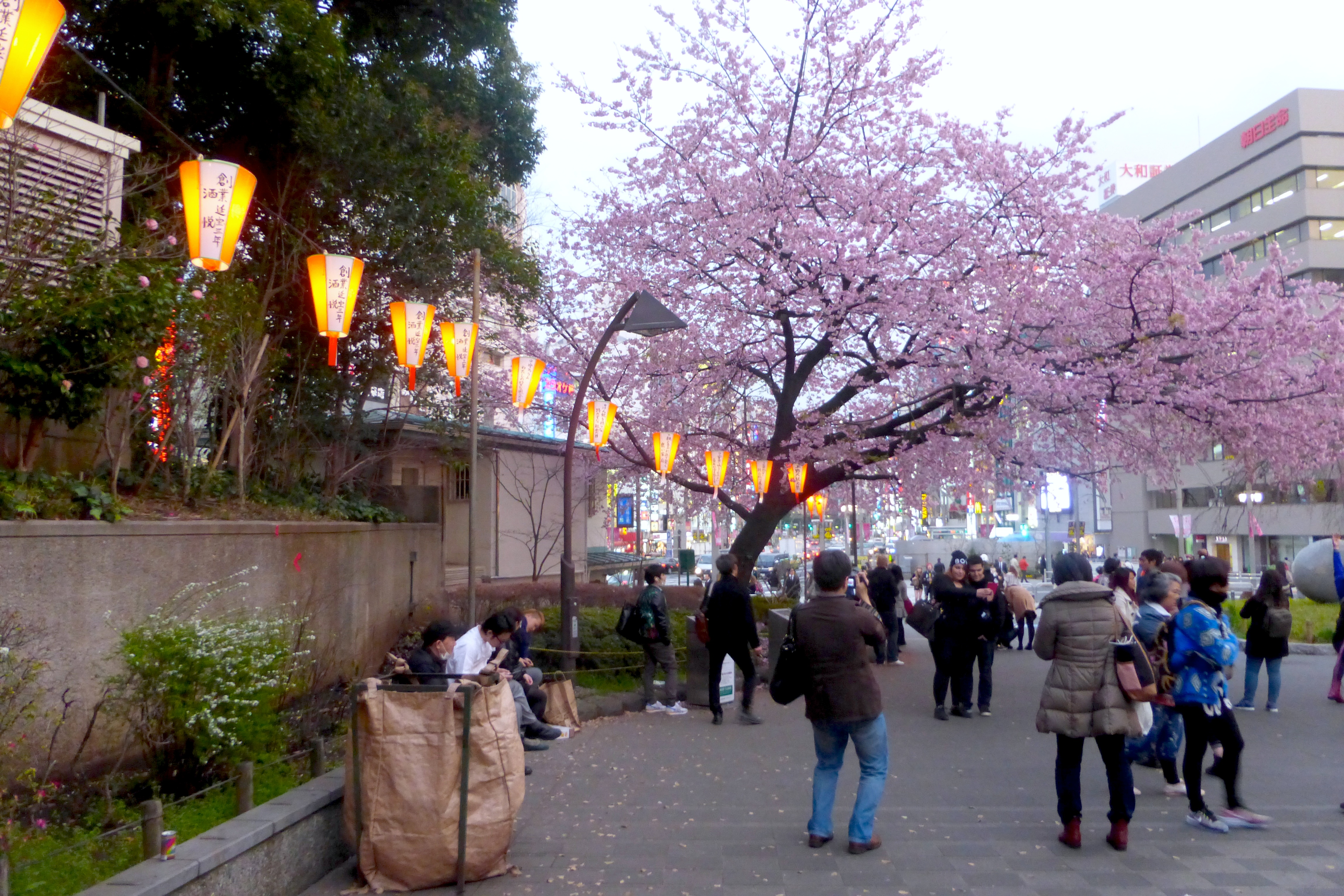
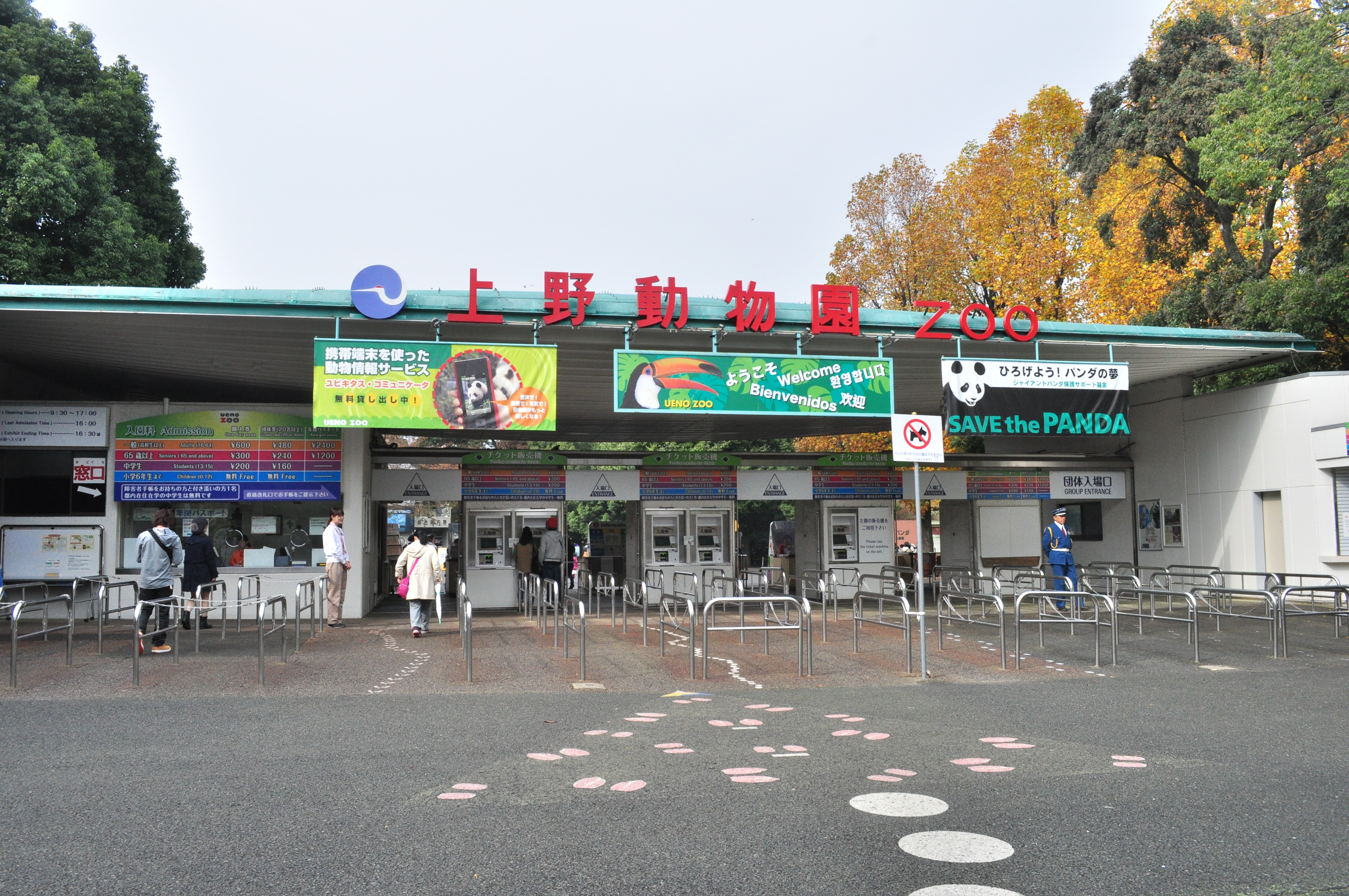
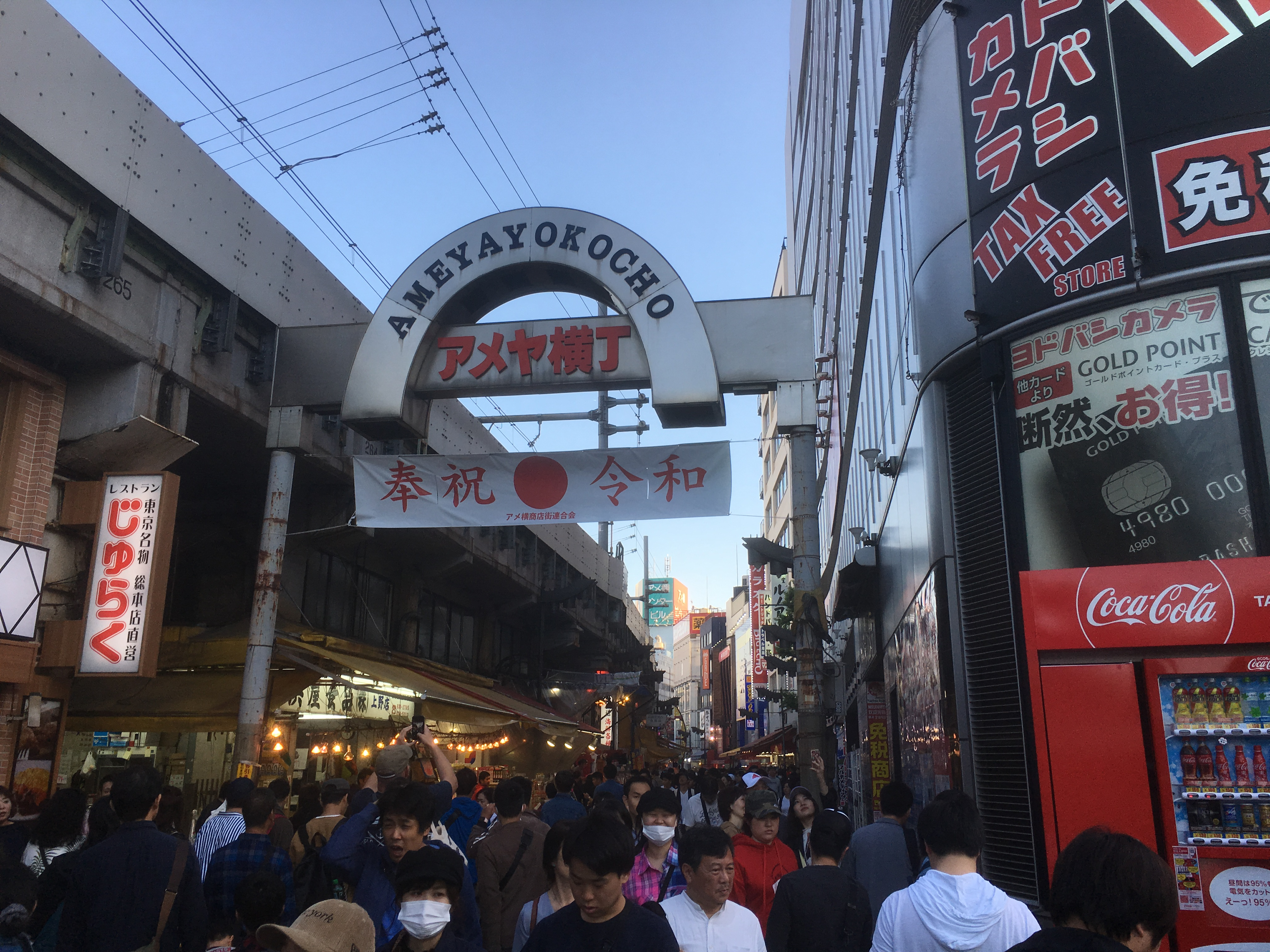
- Asakusa Senso Temple and Nakamise Street Tokyo National Museum of Ueno Shinobazu Pond in Ueno Park View of cherry blossom in Ueno Park Ueno Zoo Ameya-Yokocho shopping street

- Flag Seal

- Location of Taitō in Tokyo Metropolis

- Coordinates: 35°42′45″N 139°46′48″E
- Country: Japan
- Region: Kantō
- Prefecture: Tokyo Metropolis

Government
  - Mayor: Yukuo Hattori

Area
  - Total: 10.11 km^{2} (3.90 sq mi)

Population (October 1, 2020)
  - Total: 211,444
  - Density: 20,914/km^{2} (54,170/sq mi)
- Time zone: UTC+9 (Japan Standard Time)
- Tree: Cherry blossom
- Flower: Ipomoea nil
- City Hall Address: Higashiueno 4-5-6, Taitō-ku, Tokyo 110-8615
- Website: www.city.taito.lg.jp

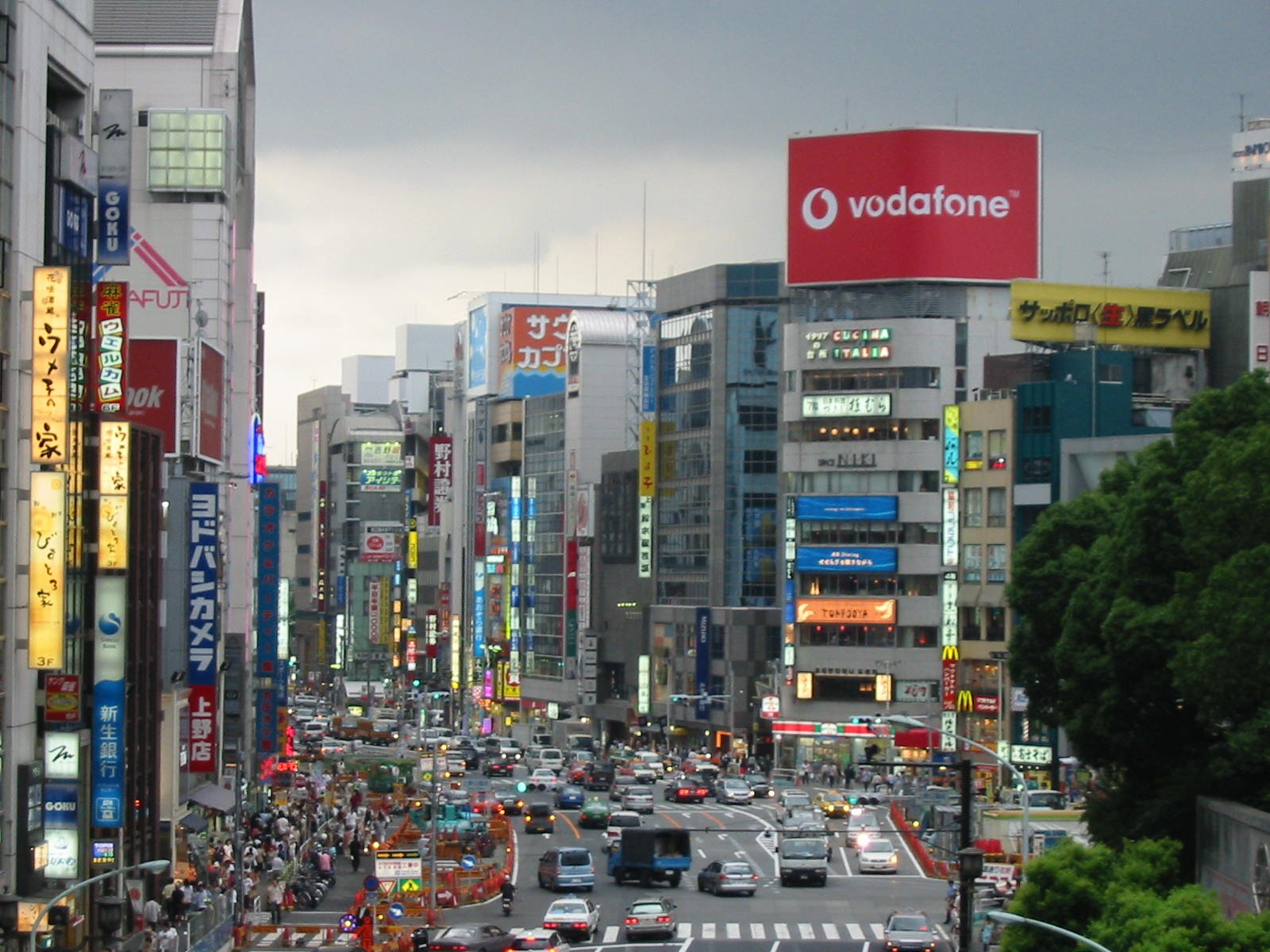
A street in Ueno, Taitō

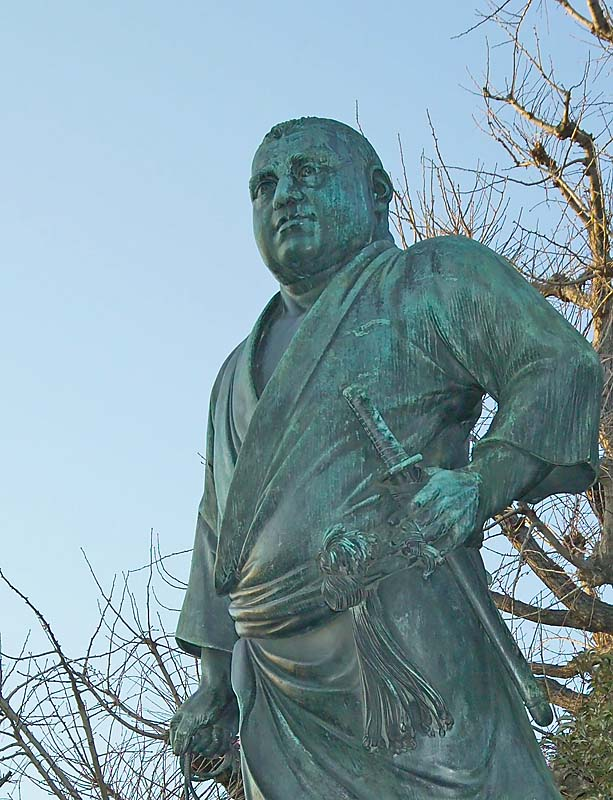
The statue of Saigō Takamori in Ueno Park

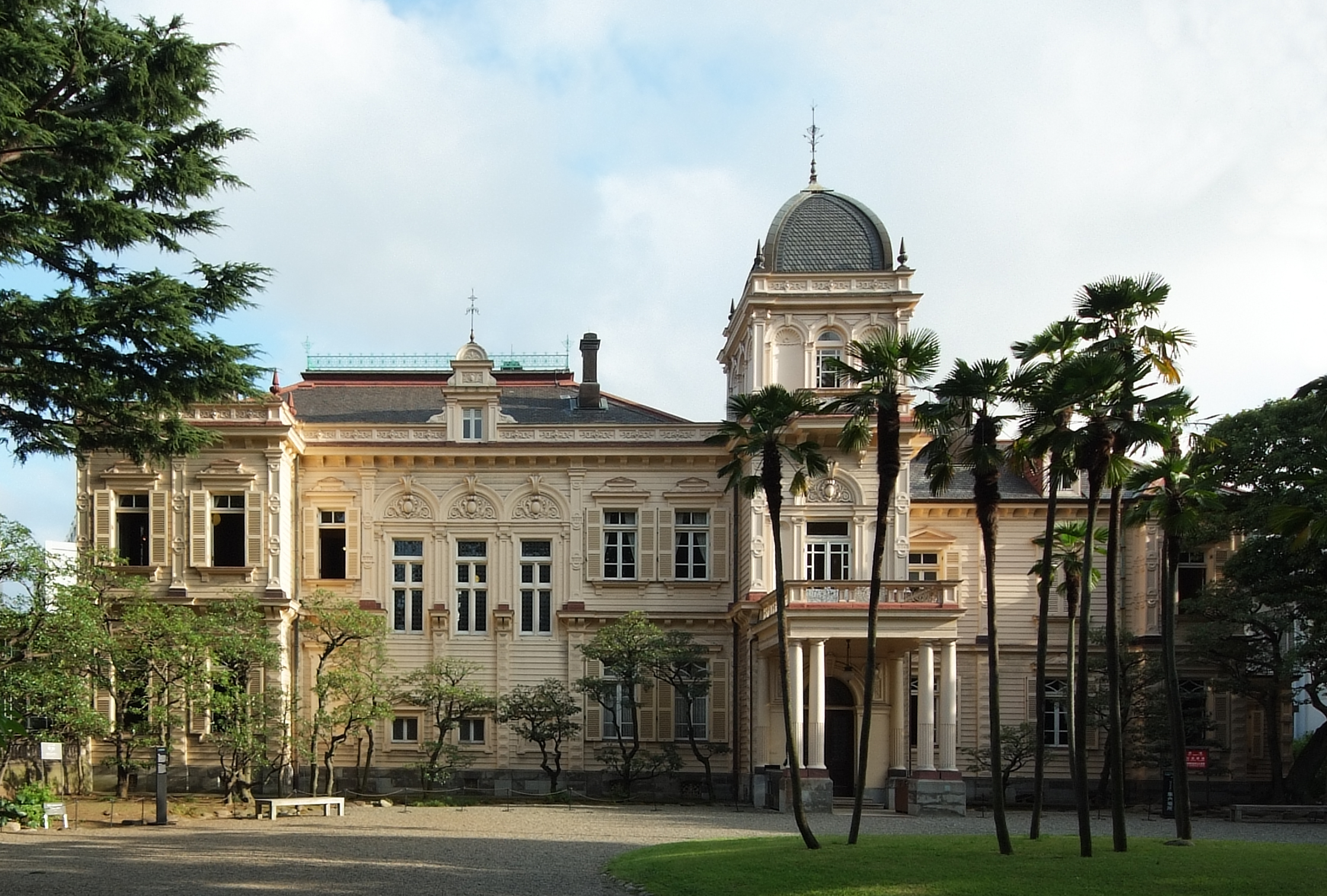
Kyu-Iwasaki-tei Garden is the former estate of the Iwasaki clan, who were founders of Mitsubishi. The building was constructed in Western style.

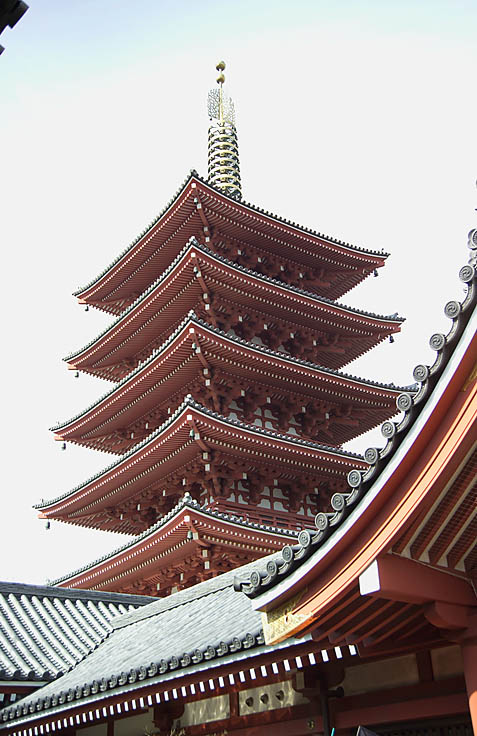
The five-storied pagoda at Sensō-ji

Taitō (台東区, Taitō-ku; Japanese pronunciation: [tä̀í.tó̞ó̞, -tó̞ò̞.kɯ̈̀]) is a special ward in the Tokyo Metropolis in Japan. In English, it is known as Taitō City.

As of October 1, 2026, the ward has an estimated population of 217,429, and a population density of 21,506 persons per km^{2}. The total area is 10.11 square kilometres (3.90 sq mi). This makes Taito ward the smallest of Tokyo's wards in area, and third-smallest in population.

== History ==
The ward was founded on March 15, 1947, with the merger of the old Asakusa and Shitaya wards when Tokyo City was transformed into Tokyo Metropolis.

During the Edo period, the Yoshiwara licensed quarter was in what is now Taitō.

== Toponymy ==
As both Asakusa and Shitaya place names had been in use for centuries, neither side wanted to be in a ward named for the other after their merger. Shitaya advocated for naming the merged ward Ueno Ward (上野区, Ueno-ku), while Asakusa preferred Higashi Ward (東区, Higashi-ku; lit. Eastern Ward). As consensus could not be reached, the Governor of Tokyo proposed Taitō Ward (台東区) as a compromise name, with tai (台; plateau) taken from Ueno Plateau (上野台, Uenodai), and tō (東; east) referring to the lowlands east of it, encompassing Asakusa and Shitaya. The name had been used before by an elementary school in Shitaya.

Other suggested names included Shitamachi Ward (下町区), Taihei Ward (太平区), Sumida Ward (隅田区; not to be confused with neighbouring Sumida Ward, written using different characters).

Taitō shares the same Chinese characters, "台東", with Taitung, a city in Taiwan.

== Geography ==
Situated in the northeastern portion of the wards area of Tokyo, Taitō is surrounded by five other special wards: Chiyoda, Bunkyō, Arakawa, Sumida and Chūō.

== Demographics ==
Historical population
Year	Pop.	±%
1908	310,941	—
1920	439,596	+41.4%
1930	415,672	−5.4%
1940	460,254	+10.7%
1945	84,569	−81.6%
1950	262,159	+210.0%
1960	318,889	+21.6%
1970	240,769	−24.5%
1980	186,048	−22.7%
1990	162,969	−12.4%
2000	156,325	−4.1%
2010	175,928	+12.5%
2020	211,444	+20.2%
Source: Censuses (Note: For years prior to 1950, figures cover the area of present-day Taito-ku.)

== Districts and neighborhoods ==
Asakusa area

- Asakusa
- Asakusabashi
- Hanakawado
- Hashiba
- Higashi-Asakusa (East Asakusa)
- Imado
- Kaminarimon
- Kiyokawa
- Kojima
- Komagata
- Kotobuki
- Kuramae
- Matsugaya
- Misuji
- Motoasakusa
- Nihonzutsumi (Japan dike)
- Nishi-Asakusa (West Asakusa)
- Torigoe
- Yanagibashi

Shitaya area

- Akihabara
- Higashi-Ueno (East Ueno)
- Ikenohata
- Iriya
- Kita-Ueno (North Ueno)
- Minowa
- Negishi
- Ryusen
- Senzoku
- Shitaya
- Taito
- Ueno
- Ueno-koen (Ueno Park)
- Uenosakuragi
- Yanaka

== Landmarks ==
Taitō is famous for its typical Shitamachi districts. The Asakusa Culture Tourist Information Center provides amenities to both tourists and locals.

=== Temples and shrines ===
- Sensō-ji and Kaminarimon (Thunder Gate)
- Asakusa Shrine
- Akiba Shrine, in Matsugaya
- Kan'ei-ji
- Kishibojin
- Ueno Tōshō-gū
- Zenshō-an

=== Parks ===
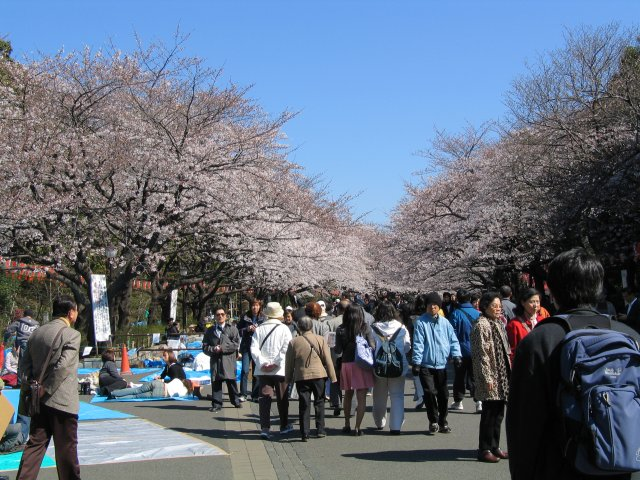
Cherry blossom in Ueno Park

- Asakusa Park
- Kyu-Iwasaki-tei Garden
- Sumida Park
- Ueno Park
- Yanaka Park

=== Museums and zoos ===
- Amuse Museum
- Asakura Sculpture Hall
- Daimyo Clock Museum
- National Museum of Western Art
- National Museum of Nature and Science
- Tokyo Metropolitan Art Museum
- Tokyo National Museum
- Ueno Royal Museum
- Ueno Zoo
- Yokoyama Taikan Memorial Hall

=== Entertainment ===
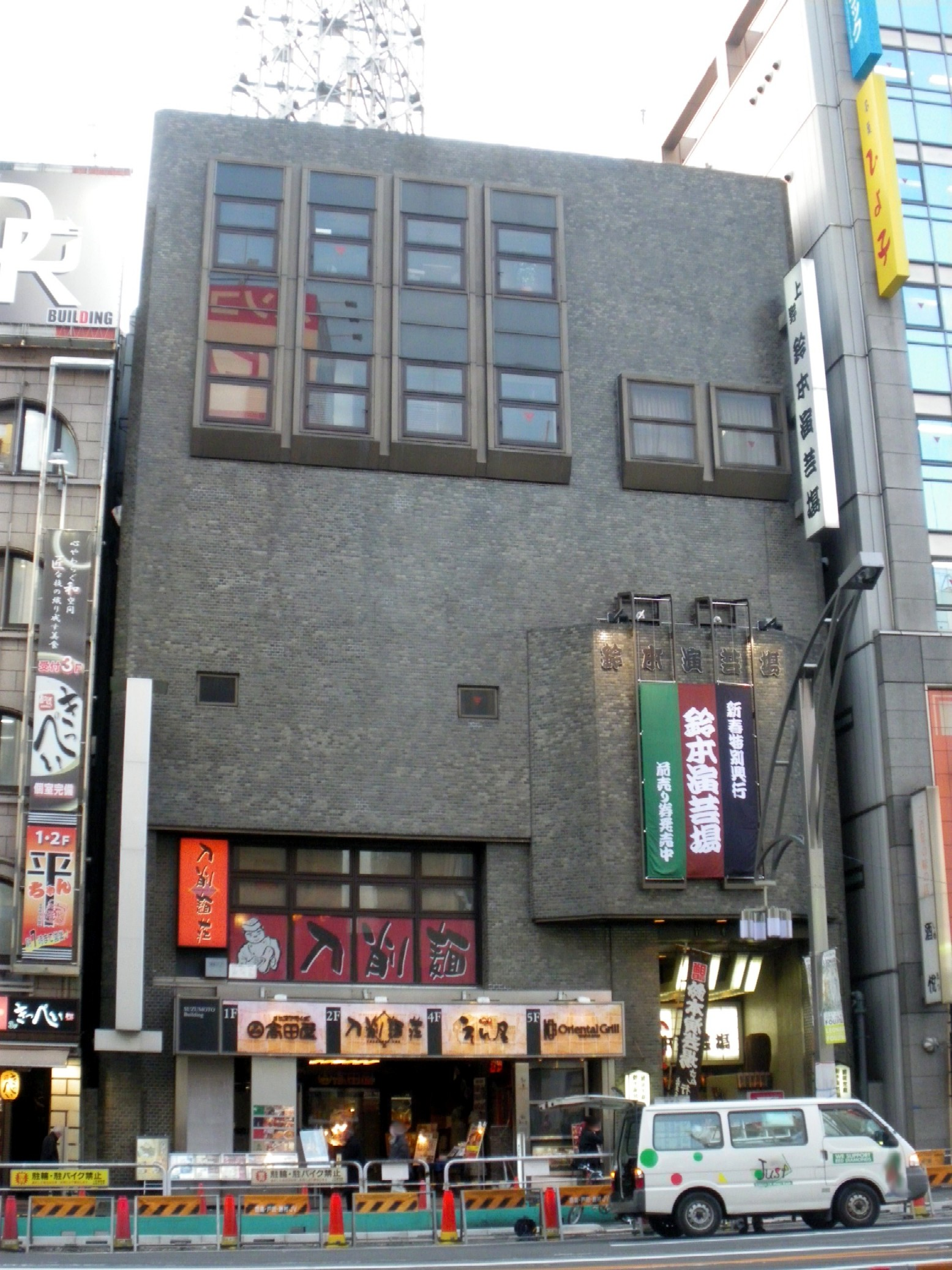
Suzumoto Vaudeville Hall in Ueno

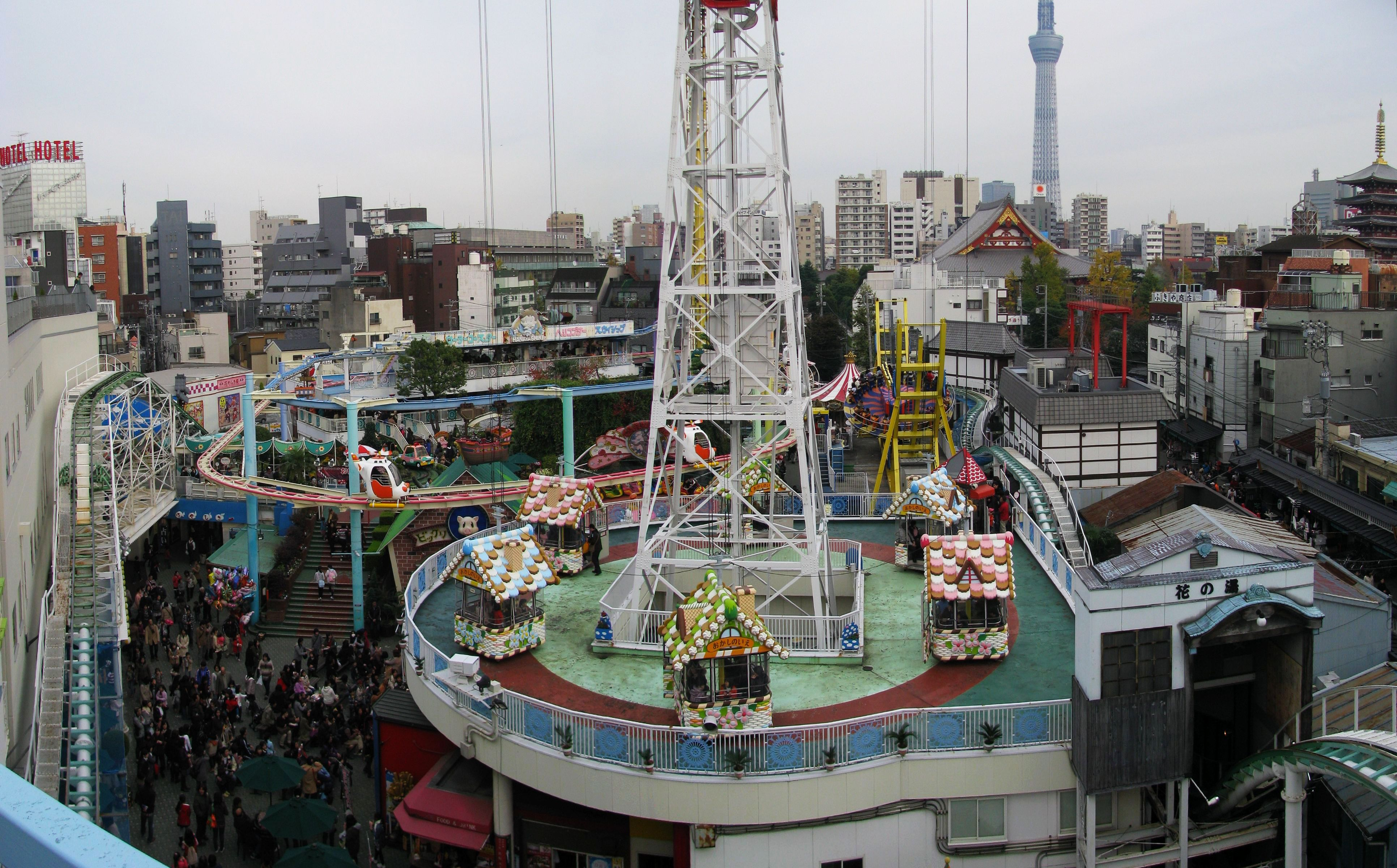
Asakusa Hanayashiki Amusement Park

- Suzumoto Engeijo (Suzumoto Vaudeville Hall)
- Asakusa Vaudeville Hall

== Economy ==
Eiken Chemical, a clinical diagnostics and equipment manufacturer, has its headquarters in Taito. Tokyo Ricoh Office Solution and Ricoh Technosystems, divisions of Ricoh, are headquartered in Taitō as of 2008. Chikumashobo, a publisher, has its headquarters in the Kuramae (蔵前) area of the ward.

=== Retail ===
- Matsuzakaya department store in Ueno
- Matsuya department store in Asakusa

=== Other ===
- Taiyo Yuden, electronics and materials company in Ueno

== Events ==
- Sumidagawa Fireworks Festival
- Asakusa Samba Carnival
- Torigoe Shrine Matsuri
- Sanja Matsuri, one of the three great festivals of Tokyo

== Education ==
=== Colleges and universities ===
- Tokyo National University of Fine Arts and Music
- Ueno Gakuen University

=== Primary and secondary schools ===
Prefectural public high schools are operated by the Tokyo Metropolitan Government Board of Education.

- Hakuo High School
- Asakusa High School
- Kuramae Technical High School
- Shinobugaoka High School
- Ueno High School
- Ueno Shinobugaoka High School
- Taito Commercial High School
- Taito Chuyakan High School

Private schools:

- Ueno Gakuen Junior and Senior High School

The school district of the metropolis also operates one metropolitan junior high school:

- Hakuo Junior High School

The Taito City Board of Education (台東区教育委員会) operates municipal elementary and junior high schools.

Municipal junior high schools:

- Asakusa Junior High School (浅草中学校)
- Hakuyo Junior High School (柏葉中学校)
- Komagata Junior High School (駒形中学校)
- Okachimachi Taito Junior High School (御徒町台東中学校)
- Sakurabashi Junior High School (台東区立桜橋中学校)
- Shinobugaoka Junior High School (忍岡中学校)
- Ueno Junior High School (上野中学校)

Municipal elementary schools:

- Asakusa Elementary School (浅草小学校)
- Fuji Elementary School (富士小学校)
- Heisei Elementary School (平成小学校)
- Higashi Asakusa Elementary School (東浅草小学校)
- Ishihama Elementary School (石浜小学校)
- Kanasogi Elementary School (金曽木小学校)
- Kinryu Elementary School (金竜小学校)
- Kuramae Elementary School (蔵前小学校)
- Kuromon Elementary School (黒門小学校)
- Matsuba Elementary School (松葉小学校)
- Negishi Elementary School (根岸小学校)
- Senzoku Elementary School (千束小学校)
- Shinobugaoka Elementary School (忍岡小学校)
- Taisho Elementary School (大正小学校)
- Taito Ikuei Elementary School (台東育英小学校)
- Tawara Elementary School (田原小学校)
- Tosen Elementary School (東泉小学校)
- Ueno Elementary School (上野小学校)
- Yanaka Elementary School (谷中小学校)

=== Public libraries ===
Taito operates several public libraries, including the Central Library, the Central Library Asakusabashi Branch, the Negishi Library, and the Ishihama Library. The Central Library is located in the first and second floors of the Lifelong Learning Center.

=== Other ===
The city operates the Lifelong Learning Center, a complex including a multi-media room, a studio, and other facilities. The Central Library is on the first and second floors of the Lifelong Learning Center.

== Transportation ==
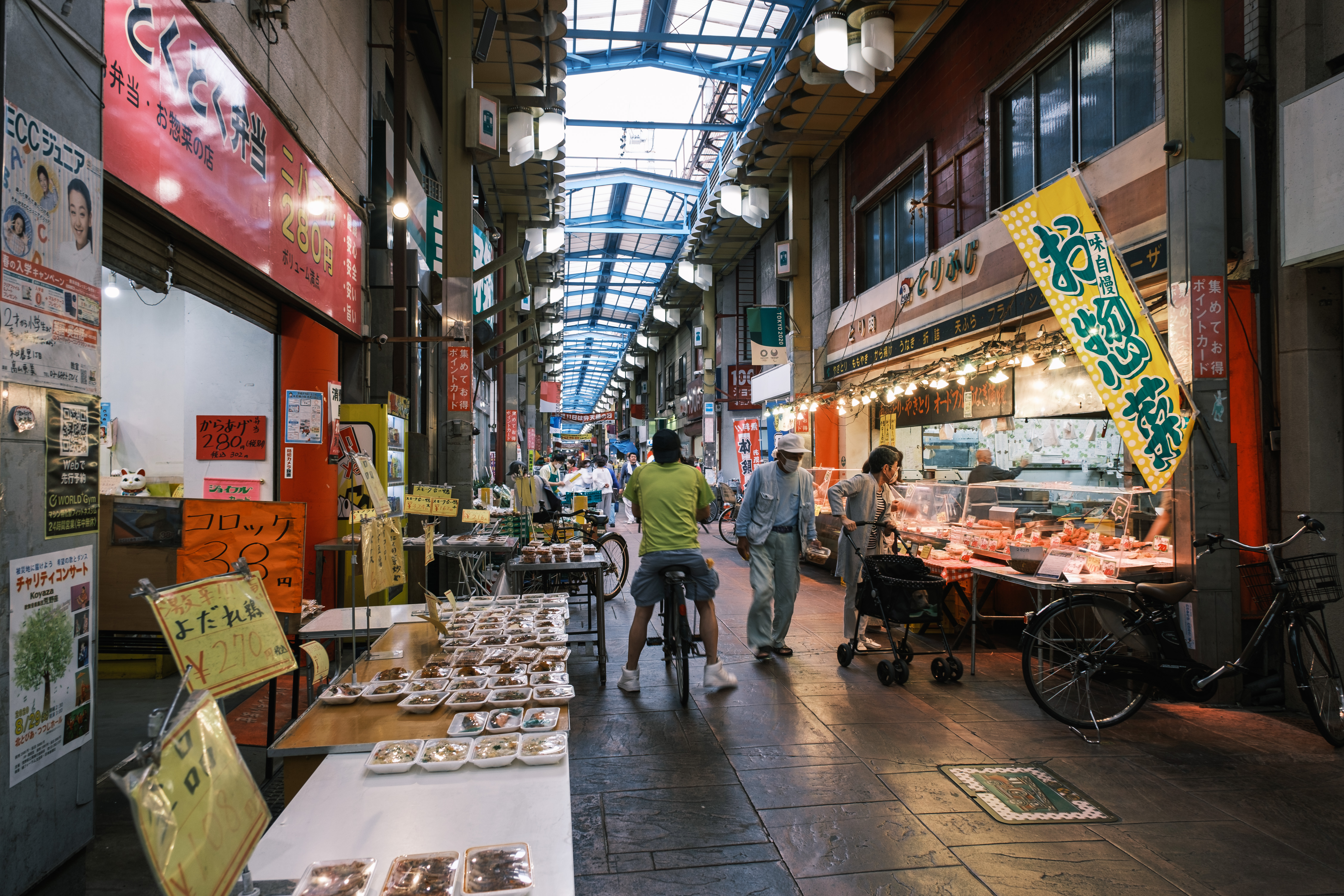
Joyful Minowa Shopping Street

=== Rail ===
- JR East
  - Tōhoku Shinkansen, Jōetsu Shinkansen, Akita Shinkansen, Yamagata Shinkansen: Ueno Station
  - Tōhoku Main Line
  - Yamanote Line, Keihin-Tōhoku Line: Okachimachi, Ueno, Uguisudani Stations. Also, Nippori Station (on the boundary with Taitō)
  - Utsunomiya Line, Takasaki Line: Ueno Station
  - Jōban Line: Officially, the line begins at Nippori Station, although most trains start/terminate at Ueno Station
- Tokyo Metro
  - Ginza Line: Ueno-Hirokoji, Inarichō, Tawaramachi, Asakusa Stations
  - Hibiya Line: Okachimachi, Ueno, Iriya, Minowa Stations
- Tokyo Metropolitan Bureau of Transportation
  - Toei Asakusa Line: Asakusa-bashi, Kuramae, Asakusa Stations
  - Toei Ōedo Line: Ueno-Okachimachi, Shin-Okachimachi, Kuramae Stations
- Keisei Electric Railway Keisei Main Line: Keisei Ueno Station
- Tobu Railway Skytree Line: Asakusa Station
- Tsukuba Express: Shin-Okachimachi, Asakusa Stations

=== Highways ===
- Shuto Expressway
  - Ueno Route
- National highways
  - National Route 4
  - National Route 6

== Sports and recreation ==
The City of Taito operates the Taito Riverside Sports Center. The center includes a gymnasium, tennis courts, two baseball fields for adults, one baseball field for children, one large swimming pool, one children's pool, and an athletic field. The gymnasium includes two courts, two budo halls, a Japanese-style archery range, a sumo ring, a training room, a table tennis room, an air-rifle shooting range, and a meeting room.

== People ==
- Remi Hirano, Japanese chef, TV personality and chanson singer
- Makoto Shimizu, Japanese musician
- Nobuo Kaneko, Japanese actor
- Toriyama Sekien, ukiyo-e artist of Japanese folklore
