= Sumida River =

River in central Tokyo, Japan

Coordinates: 35°43′07″N 139°48′26″E

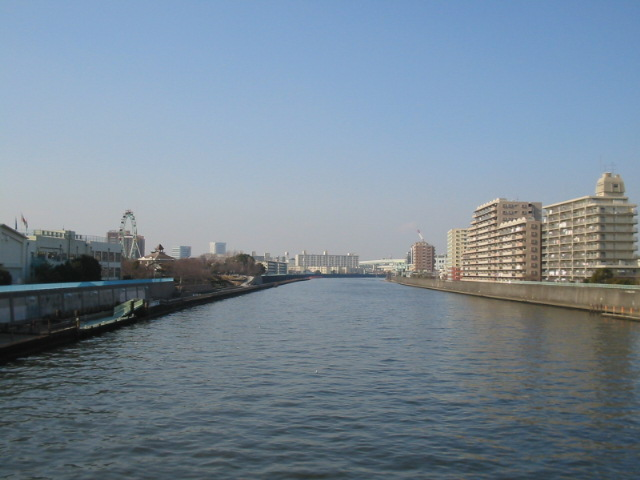
- The Sumida River flowing through Adachi, Tokyo

The Sumida River (隅田川, Sumida-gawa; Japanese pronunciation: [sɨ̀.mʲí.dä́.ɡä̀.β̞ä̀, -ŋä̀-]) is a river that flows through central Tokyo, Japan. It branches from the Arakawa River at Iwabuchi (in Kita-ku) and flows into Tokyo Bay. Its tributaries include the Kanda and Shakujii rivers.

It passes through the Kita, Adachi, Arakawa, Sumida, Taitō, Kōtō and Chūō wards of Tokyo.

What is now known as the "Sumida River" was previously the path of the Arakawa. Toward the end of the Meiji era, the Arakawa was manually diverted to prevent flooding, as the Imperial Palace in Chiyoda is nearby.

== Art ==
Sumida Gawa pottery was named after the Sumida River and was originally manufactured in the Asakusa district near Tokyo by potter Inoue Ryosai I and his son Inoue Ryosai II. In the late 1890s, Ryosai I developed a style of applied figures on a surface with flowing glaze, based on Chinese glazes called "flambe." Sumida pieces could be teapots, ash trays, or vases, and were made for export to the West. Inoue Ryosai III, grandson of Ryosai I, moved the manufacturing site to Yokohama in 1924, but the pieces continued to be identified as Sumida ware. The pottery has been subject to various myths, such as being manufactured on the make-believe island of Poo, which was washed away by a typhoon, or being manufactured by Korean prisoners of war. Sandra Andacht wrote in 1987, "Sumida gawa wares have found great popularity with collectors, dealers and investors. The motifs conform to the general Western concepts of what Oriental designs are expected to depict; writhing dragons, Buddhist disciples, mythological and legendary beings and creatures. Thus, these wares are sought after and prices (here in the States) are high, even for pieces in less than perfect condition."

Eitai Bridge and Tsukuda – Hiroshige, 1830

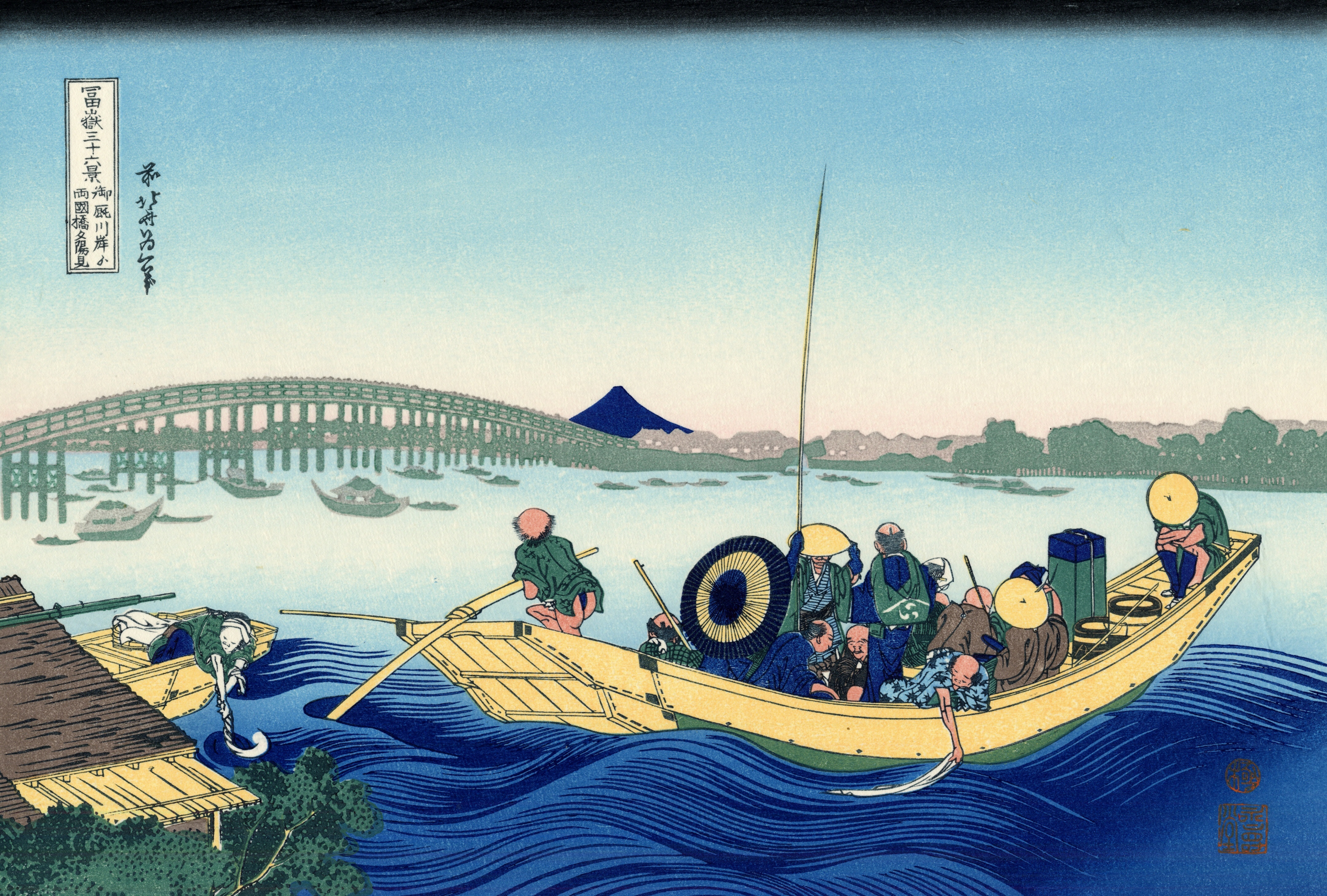
Sunset across the Ryōgoku bridge from the bank of the Sumida River at Onmayagashi – Hokusai, 1830

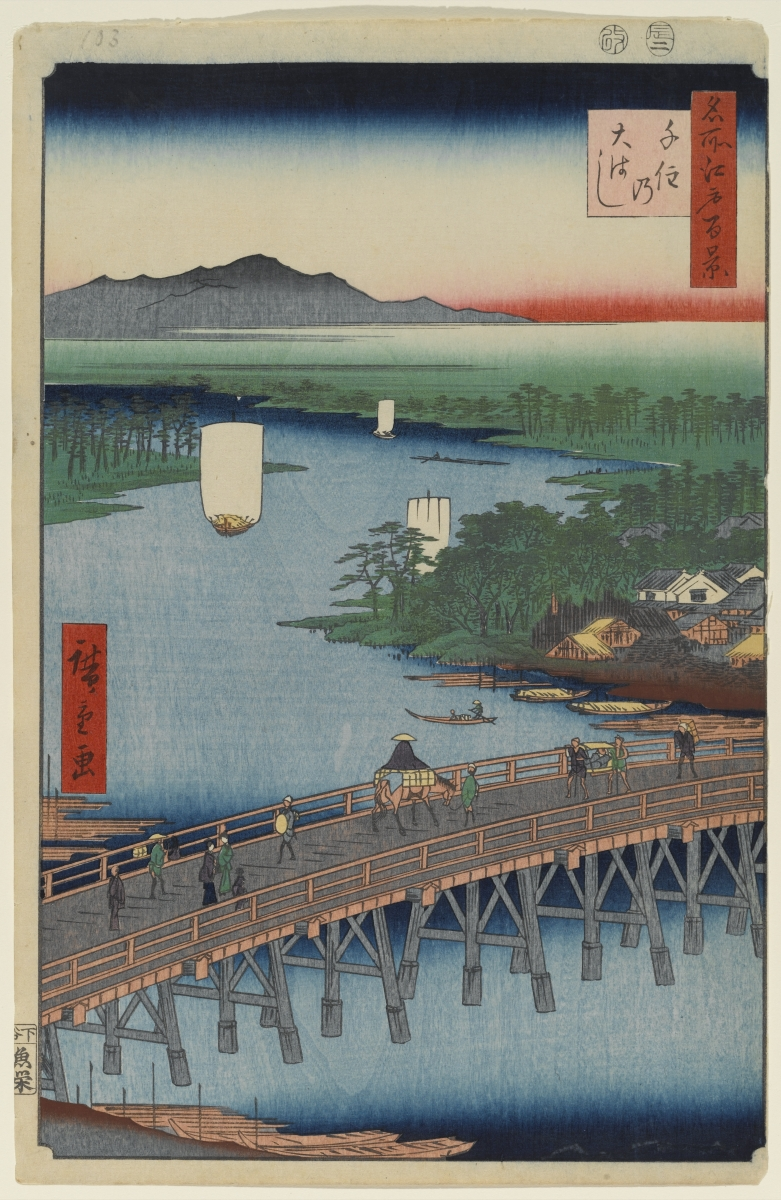
Senju Great Bridge – Hiroshige, 1856

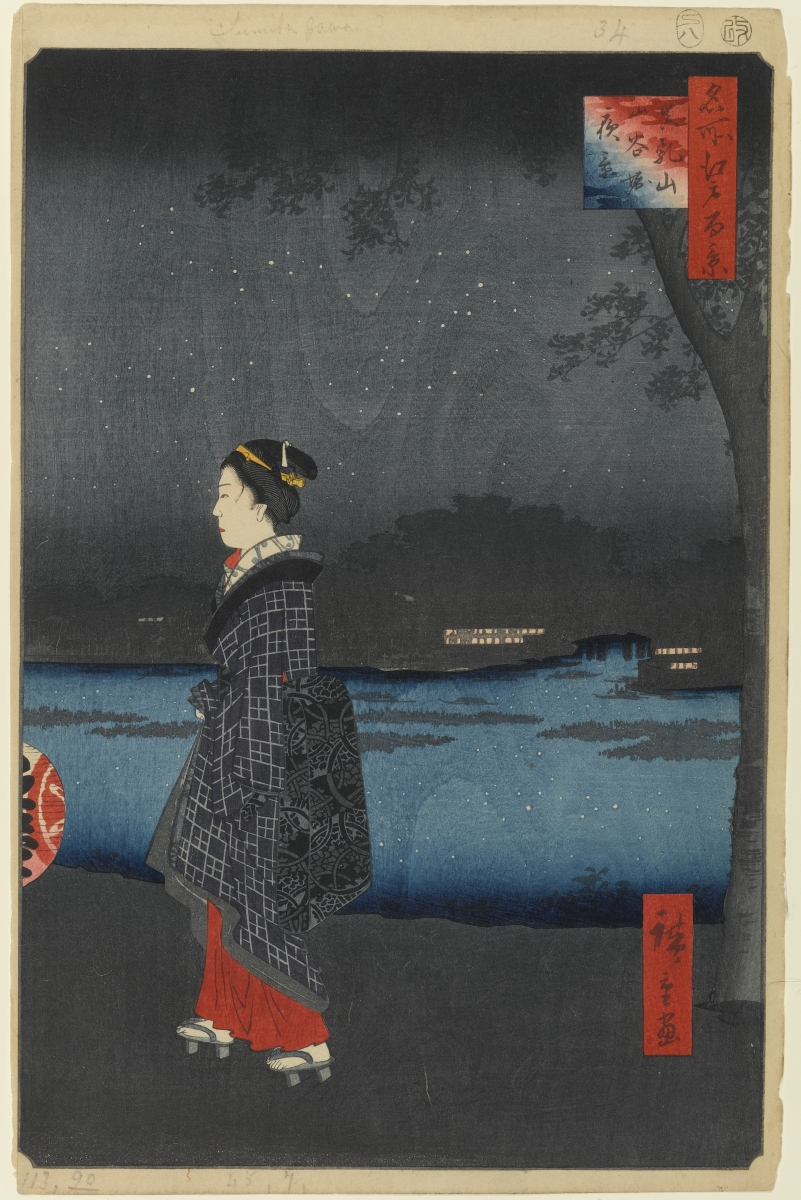
Night View of the Matsuchiyama and Sam'ya Canal – Hiroshige, 1857

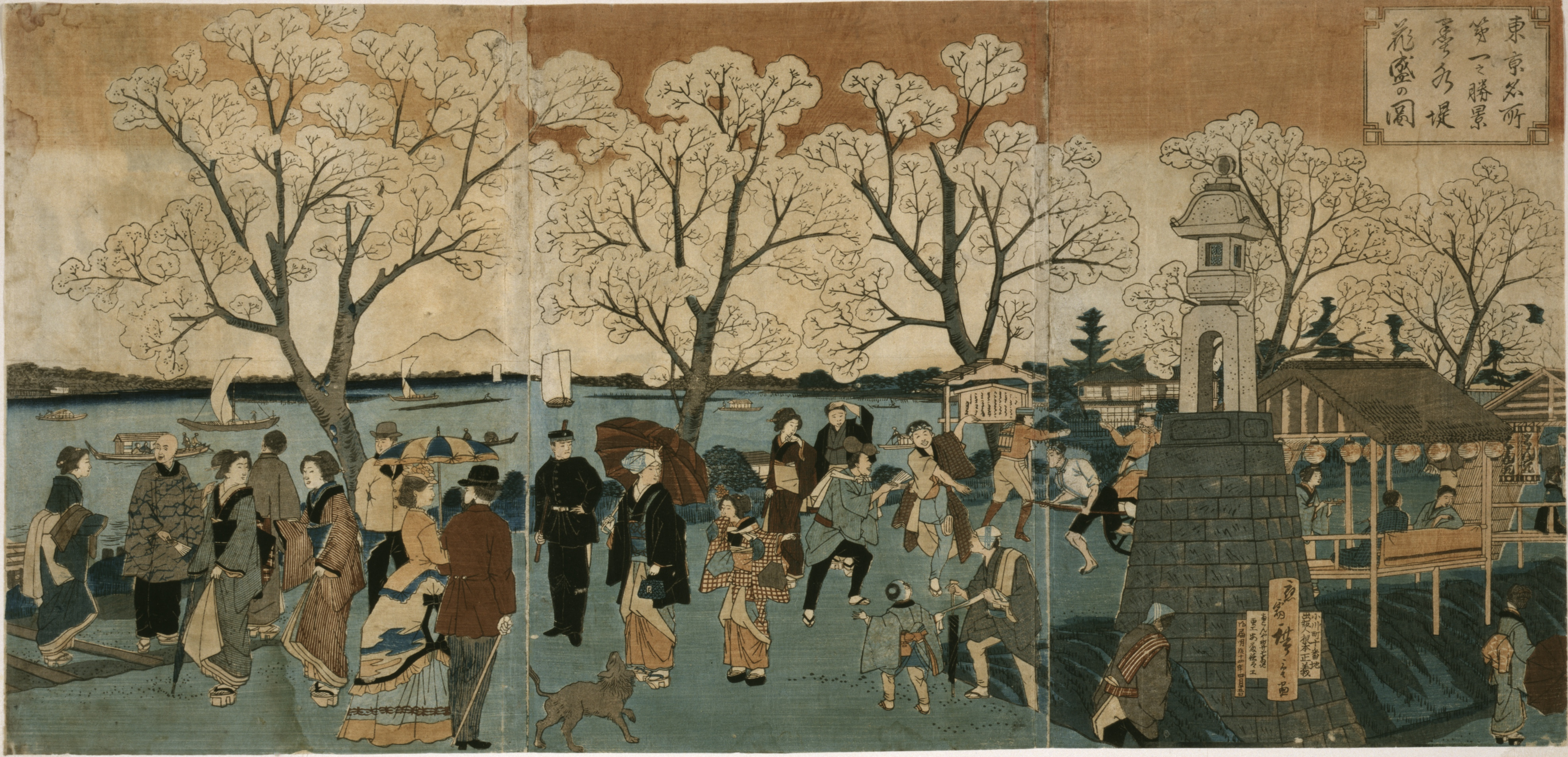
Bokusui tsutsumi hanazakari no zu – Hiroshige III, 1881

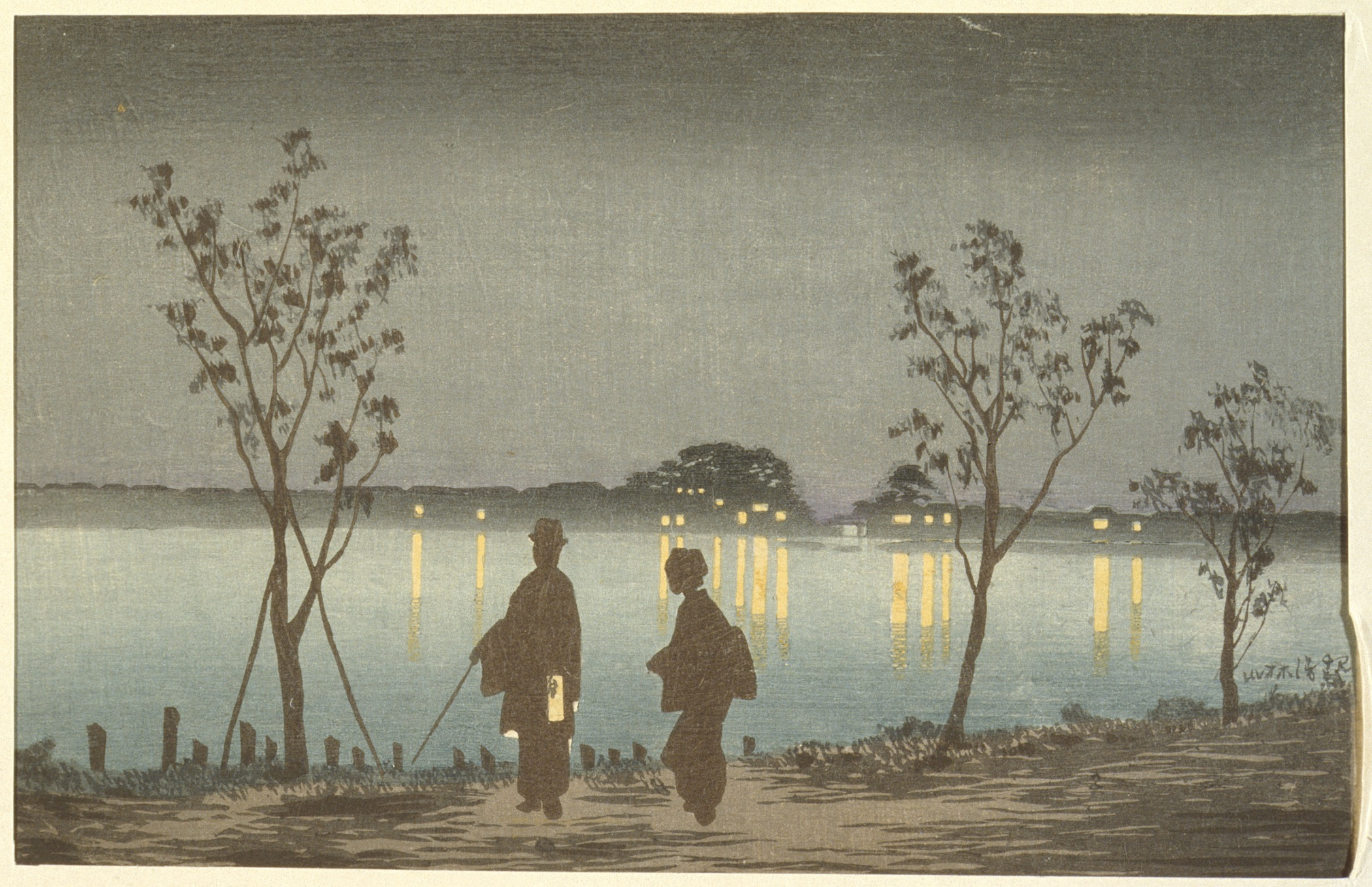
Night on the Sumida River – Kobayashi Kiyochika, 1881

== Culture ==
The Noh play Sumida-gawa, which the British composer Benjamin Britten saw while visiting Japan in 1956, inspired him to compose Curlew River (1964), a dramatic work based on the story.

The kabuki play, Sumida-gawa — Gonichi no Omokage, is perhaps better known by the title Hokaibo, which is the name of the central character. This stage drama was written by Nakawa Shimesuke, and it was first produced in Osaka in 1784. The play continues to be included in kabuki repertoire in Japan; and it is also performed in the West. It was recreated by the Heisei Nakamura-za in the Lincoln Center Festival in New York in the summer of 2007, with Nakamura Kanzaburō XVIII leading the cast.

The Sumida River Fireworks, which are recognized as one of the oldest and most famous firework displays in Japan, are launched from barges across the river between Ryōgoku and Asakusa. During summer, a festival is also held at the same time.

== Literature ==
The poet Matsuo Bashō lived by the Sumida River, alongside the famous banana tree (Japanese: bashō) from which he took his nom de plume. See, for example, the opening lines of "Records of a Weather Exposed Skeleton," published in The Narrow Road to the Deep North and Other Travel Sketches (Penguin Classics, 1967).

The Sumida River appears in a haiku by Issa from 1820:

Harusame ya
Nezumi no nameru
Sumida-gawa

Translation:

spring rain—
a mouse is lapping
Sumida river

== Bridges ==
The Sumida runs through Tokyo for 27 kilometres (17 mi), under 26 bridges spaced at about one bridge per kilometer. Amongst these, the principal ones are:

- The Ryōgoku-bashi (Ryōgoku Bridge), dating from 1932, replaced a bridge built in 1659. This bridge was immortalized many times by Hiroshige.
- The Eitai-bashi (Eitai Bridge), dating from 1924, replaces a bridge built in 1696.
- The Senju Bridge, dating from 1921, replaced an earlier bridge initially constructed in 1594, which was for a long time the only bridge across the river.
- The Sakura Bridge, dating from 1985, linking Sumida Park and Bokutei-dori Avenue.
- The Kototoi Bridge, dating from 1928, was reconstructed at the location of the bridge which linked two nearby temples—the Mimeguri-Jinja and the Matsuchiyama-shoden.
- The Azuma Bridge, dating from 1931, replaced the bridge which was first built in 1774. This bridge is closest to Asakusa Station and the Kaminari-Mon.
- The Komagata Bridge, dating from 1927, takes its name from the Matsugata temple dedicated to Bato-Kanon.
- The Umaya Bridge, dating from 1929, replaced a bridge built in 1875.
- The Kuramae-bashi, built in 1924.
- The Shin Ohashi (New Bridge), dating from 1976, replaced a bridge built in 1693. This bridge was not far from the Ryōgoku Bridge.
- The Kiyosu Bridge, built in 1928 after the model of the Deutz Suspension Bridge of Cologne, links Kiyosu with Nihonbashi-Nakasu.
- The Chuo Bridge was opened in 1994.
- The Tsukuda Bridge, dating from 1964, was the first bridge built after World War II, crossing the river from Tsukiji to Tsukishima.
- The Kachidoki Bridge was constructed in 1940 for the commemoration of the victory of the Japanese army at Lushun during the Russo-Japanese War. This bridge is the only drawbridge on the Sumida and has not been raised since 1970.
- Tsukiji Ohashi is the newest bridge across the Sumida, opening in 2018 right next to the former site of Tsukiji Market.
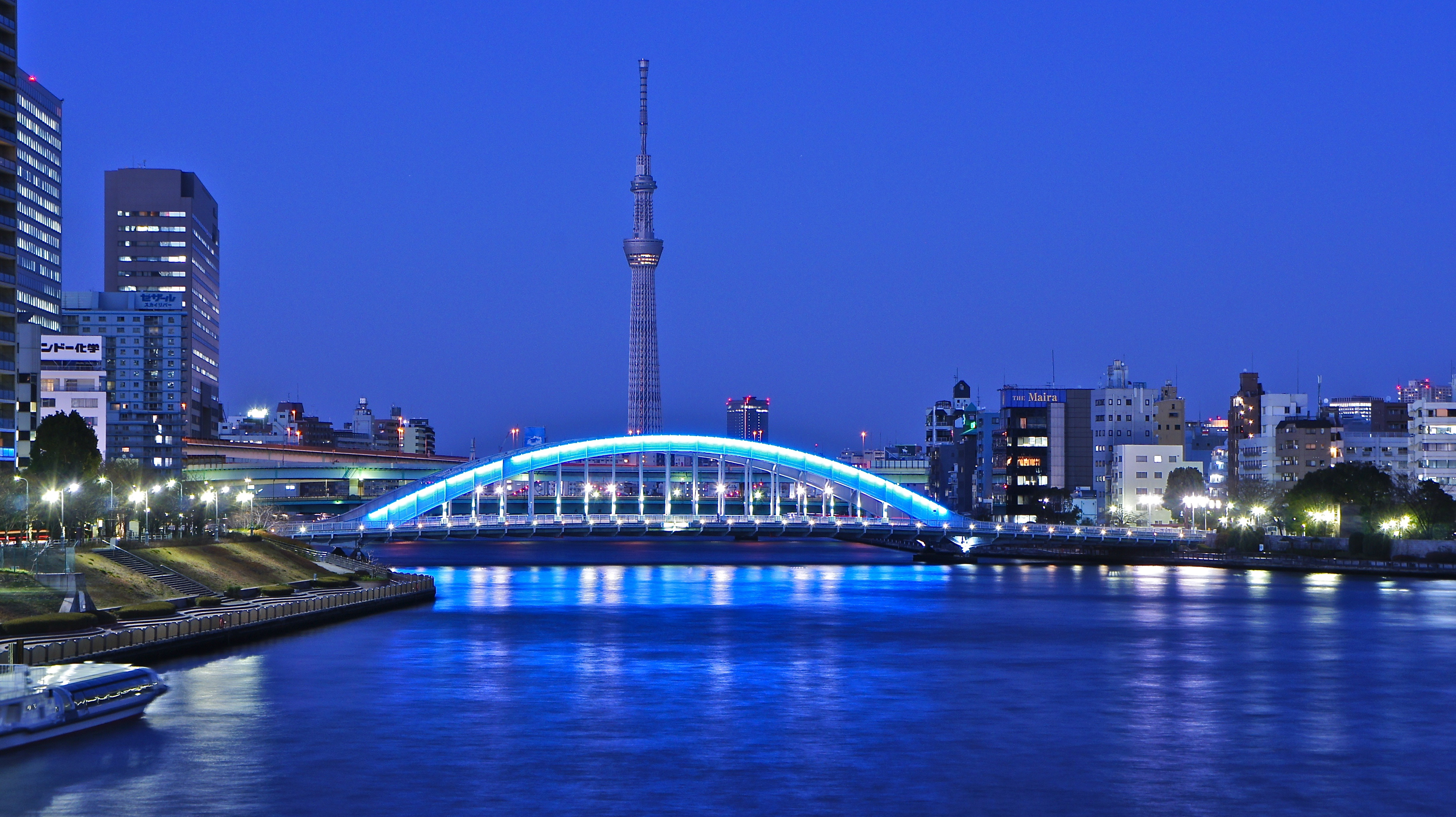
Sumida River and Eitai Bridge (2012)

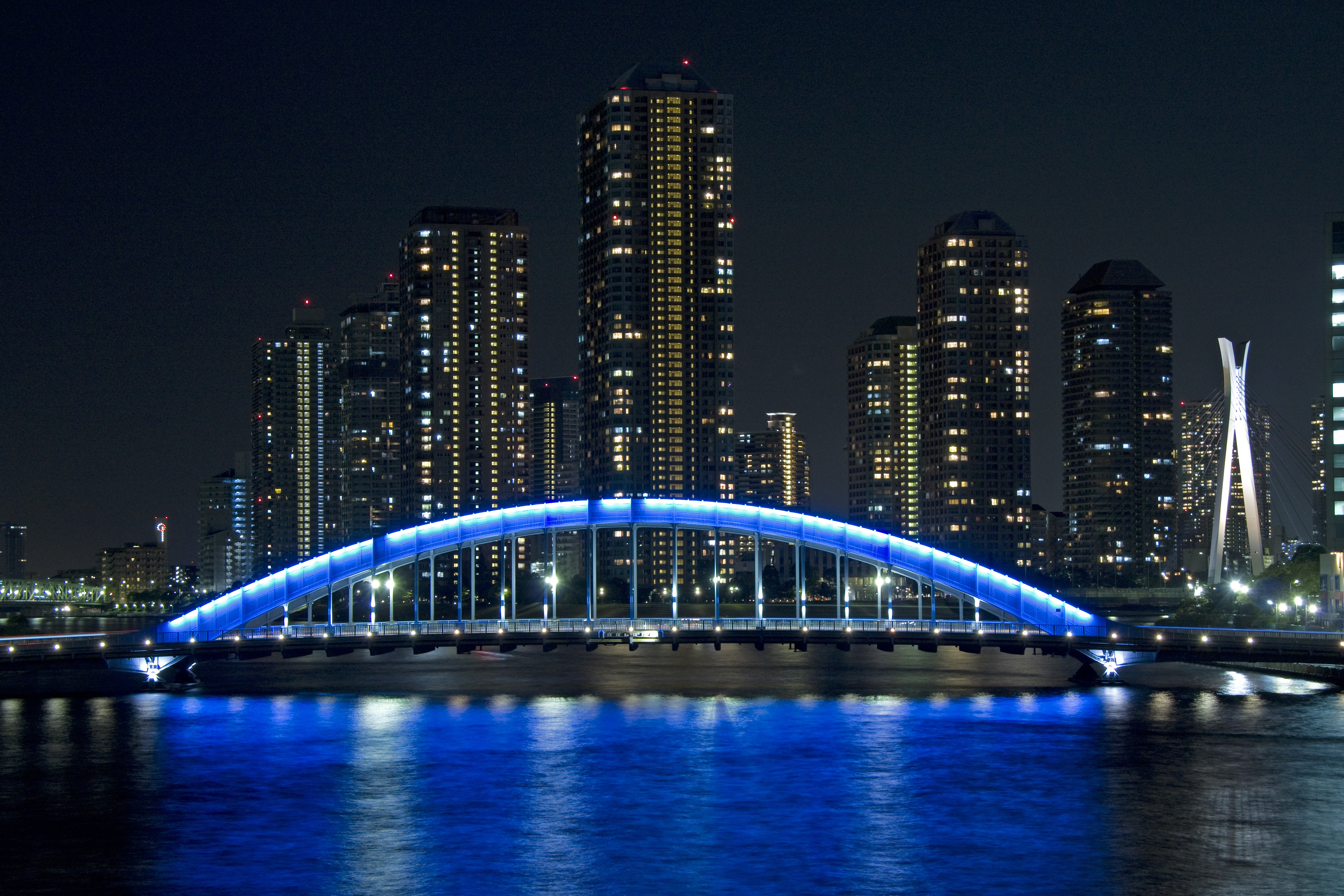
Eitai Bridge

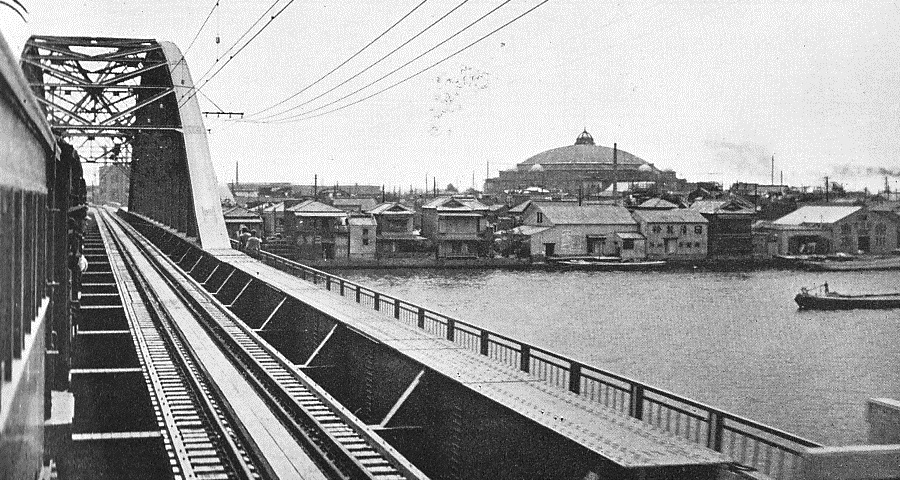
Sumidagawa Bridge in 1930s

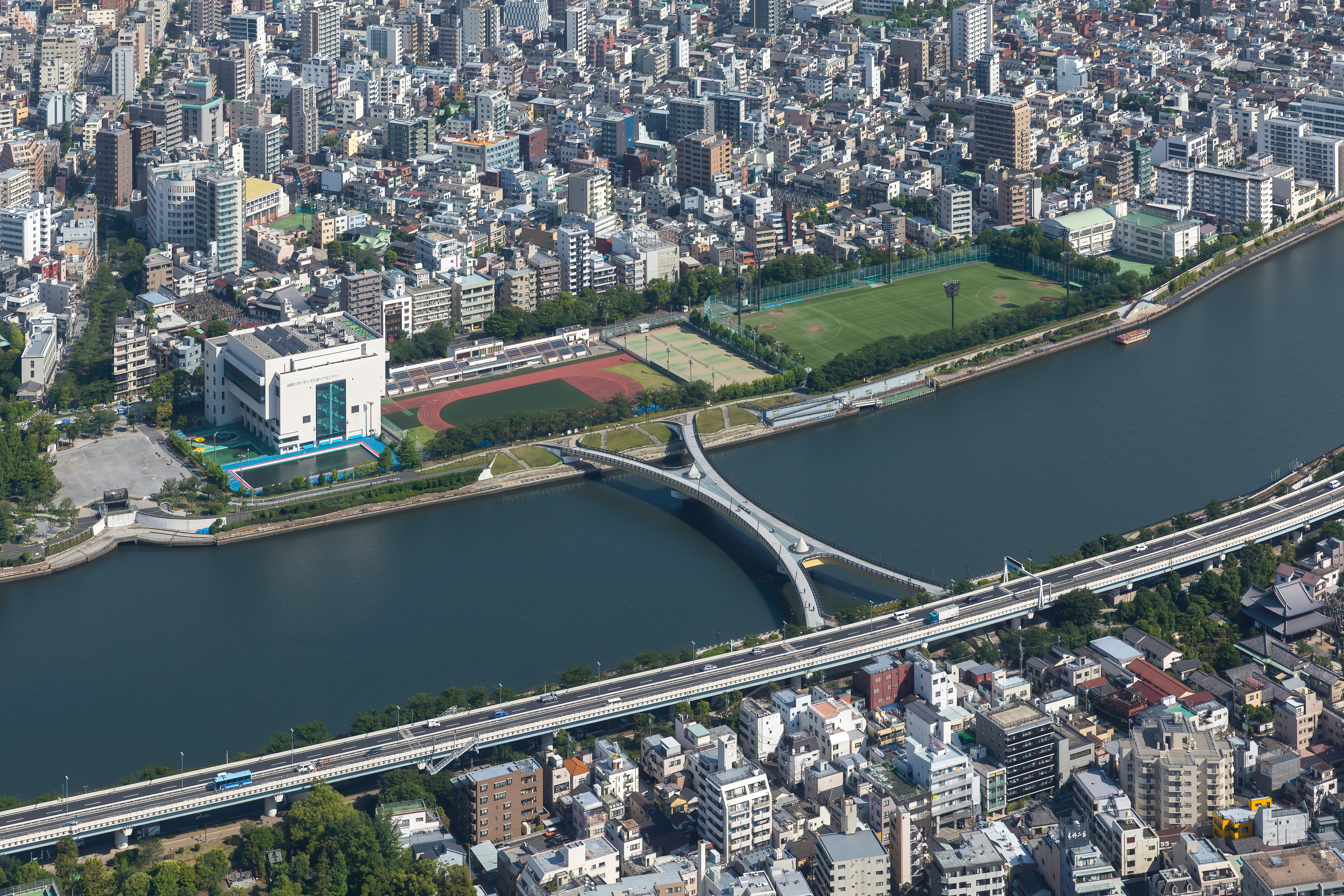
Sakura Bridge

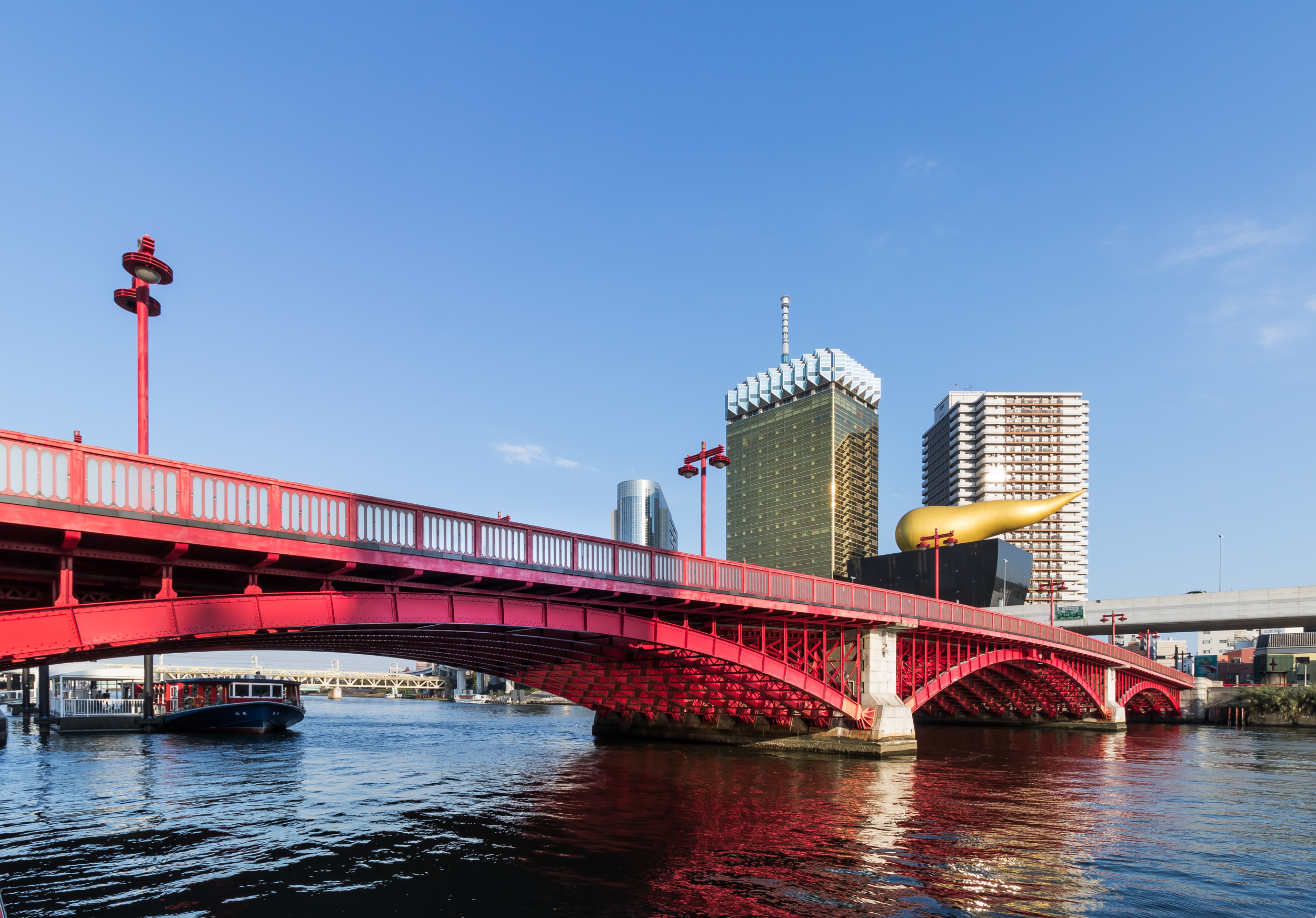
Azuma Bridge

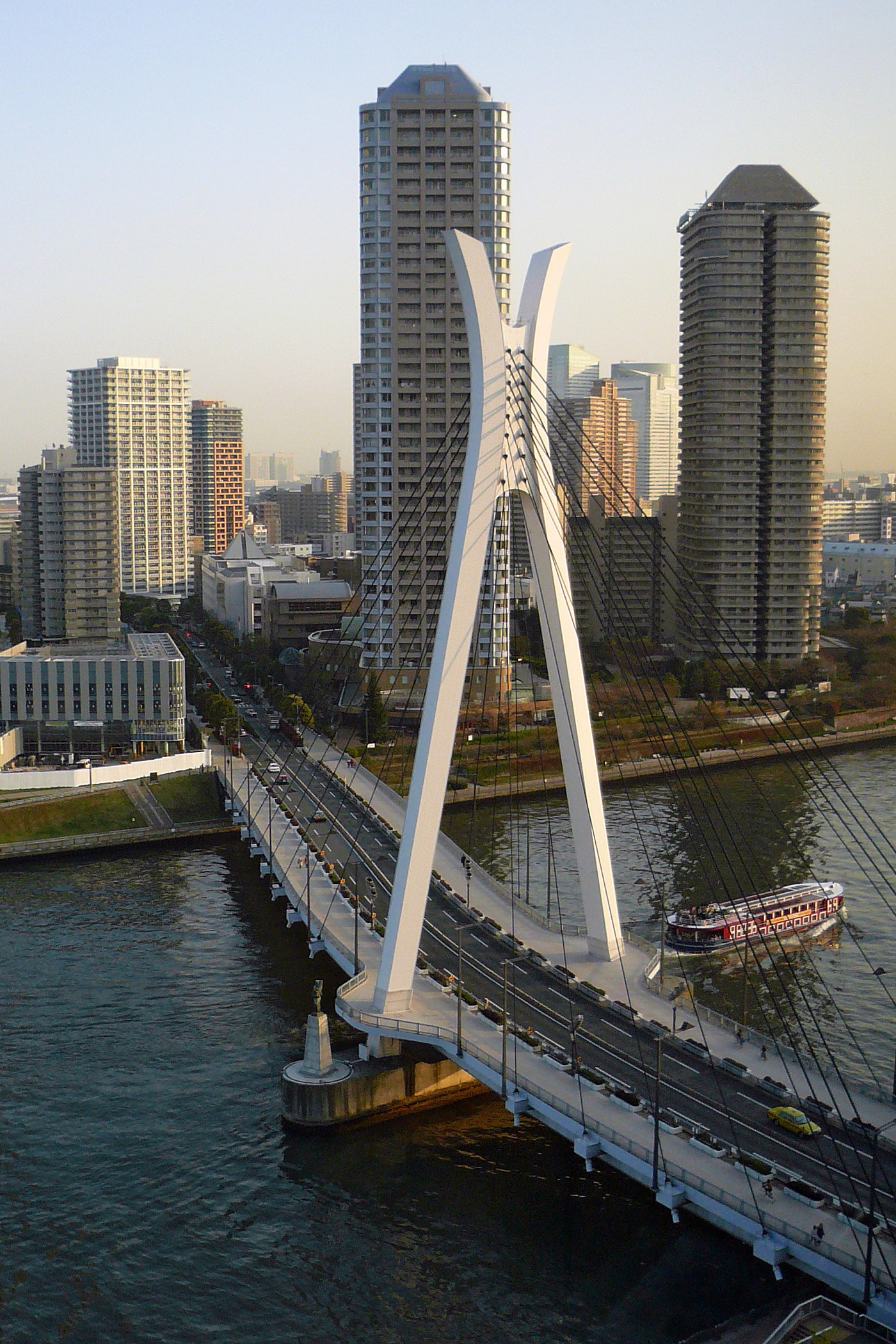
Chuo Bridge

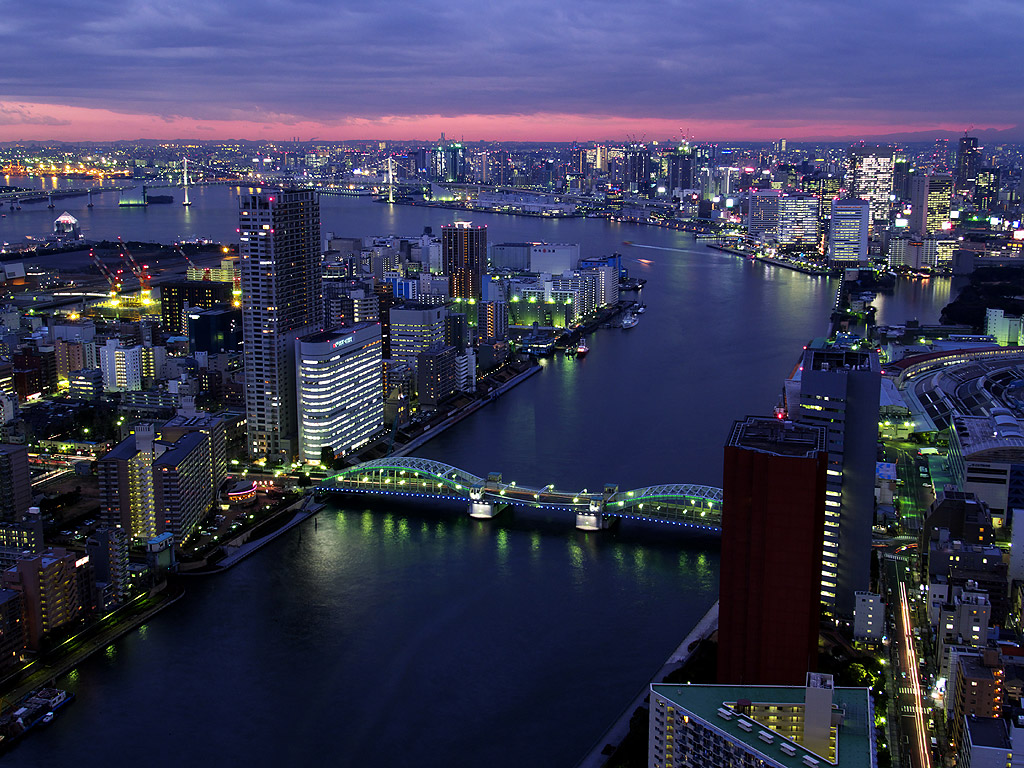
Kachidoki Bridge

== Panorama ==
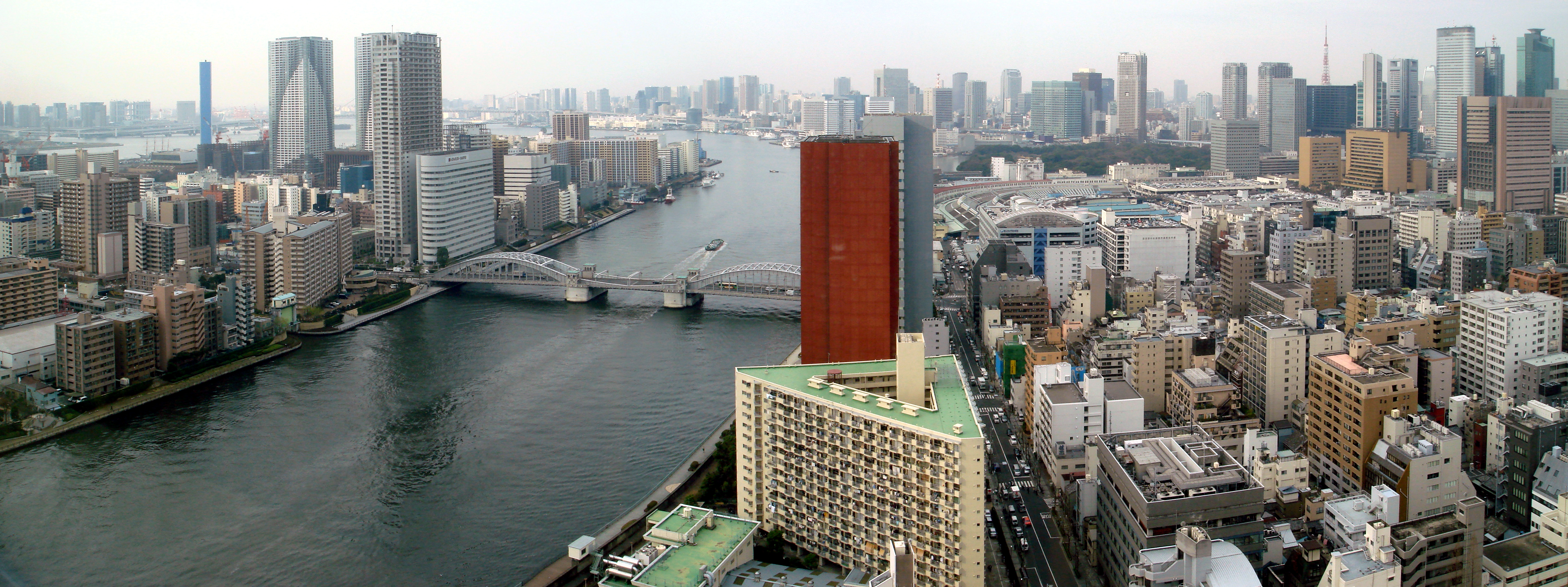
The mouth of the Sumida River (facing southwest) enters the Tokyo Port region of Tokyo Bay. The bridge visible is the Kachidoki Bridge (Kachidoki Ohashi). To the left (east) of the river is the lower portion of Tsukishima (island neighborhood): the two twin towers on the island are The Tokyo Towers, a condominium complex. Further to the left (east) is the blue smokestack of the Chuo Incineration Plant on Harumi Island. On the top left horizon is Odaiba. To the right (west) is the Tsukiji neighborhood, with the famous Tsukiji fish market visible to the right of and behind the reddish building (it is the shape of a quarter-circle). The large garden behind the market are the Hamarikyu Gardens. The coffee-colored building to the right of Tsujkiji market (with the slanting bottom) is the headquarters of the Asahi Shimbun. The collection of modern skyscrapers immediately behind the Asahi Shimbun make up the Shiodome area; and behind those towers is the top of Tokyo Tower.

== See also ==
- Senju Thermal Power Station
