= Sumidagawa Fireworks Festival =

Annual fireworks show in Japan

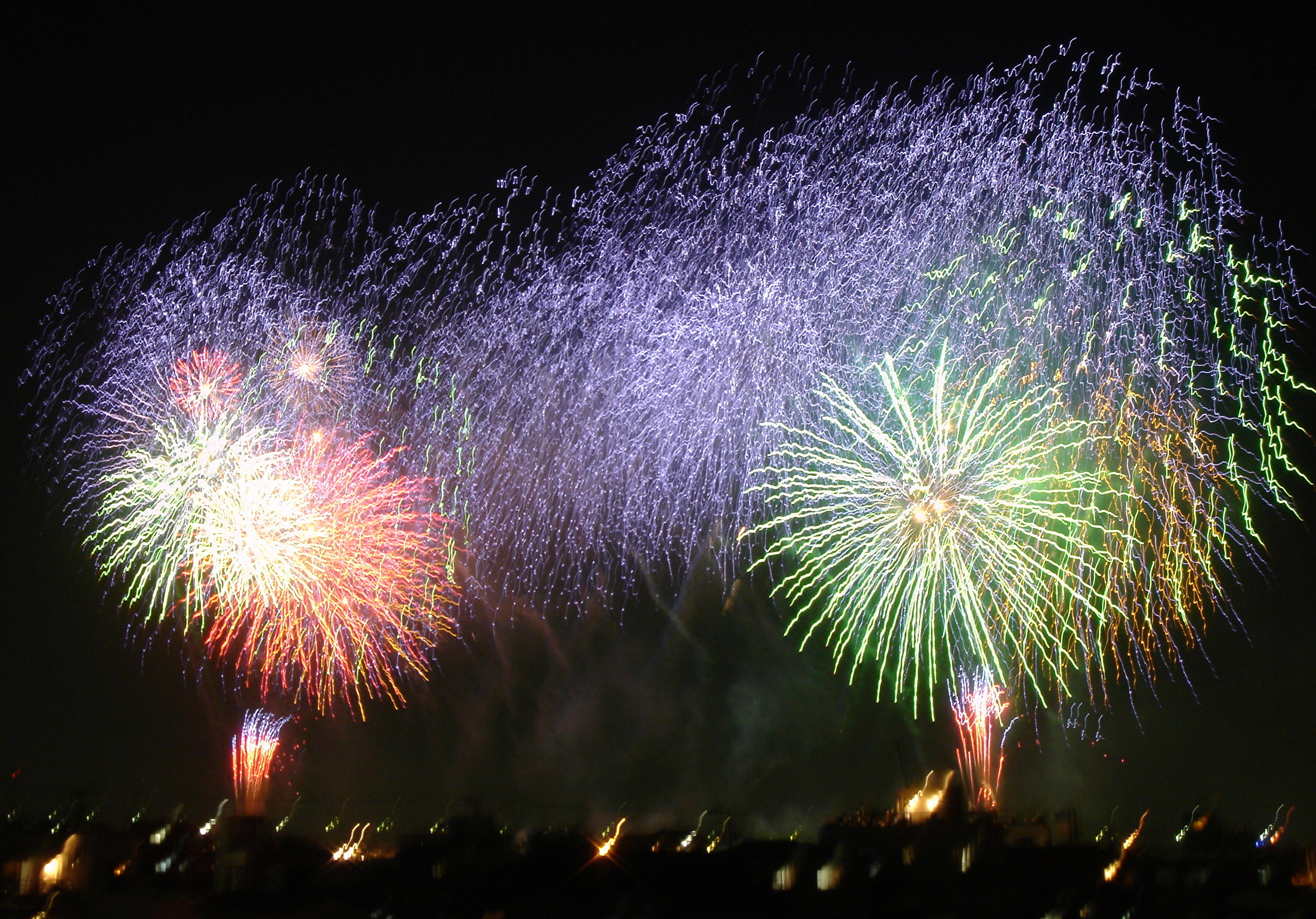
- Observed by: Sumida River, Tokyo, Japan
- Type: local
- Celebrations: fireworks displays
- Date: Last Saturday in July
- 2025 date: July 26
- 2026 date: July 25
- 2027 date: July 31
- 2028 date: July 29

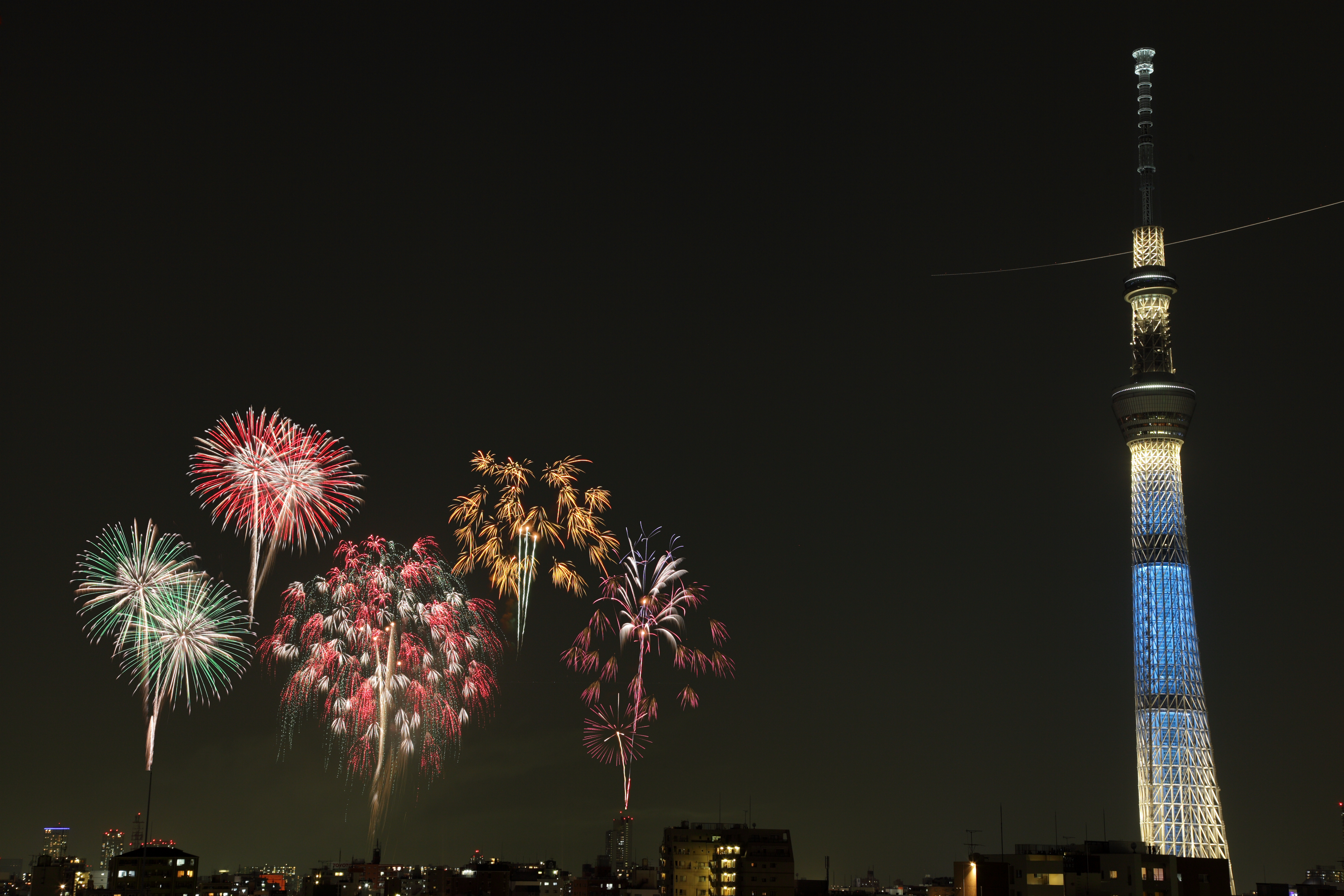
Tokyo Skytree

The Sumidagawa Fireworks Festival (Japanese: 隅田川花火大会, Hepburn: Sumidagawa Hanabi Taikai) is an annual fireworks festival held on the last Saturday in July, over the Sumidagawa River near Asakusa. The Sumidagawa Hanabi Taikai follows the Japanese tradition of being a competition between rival pyrotechnic groups. It is a revival of celebrations held in the Edo period, and annually attracts close to a million celebrants. Similar events are held at the same time of year at many other sites throughout Japan.

== History ==
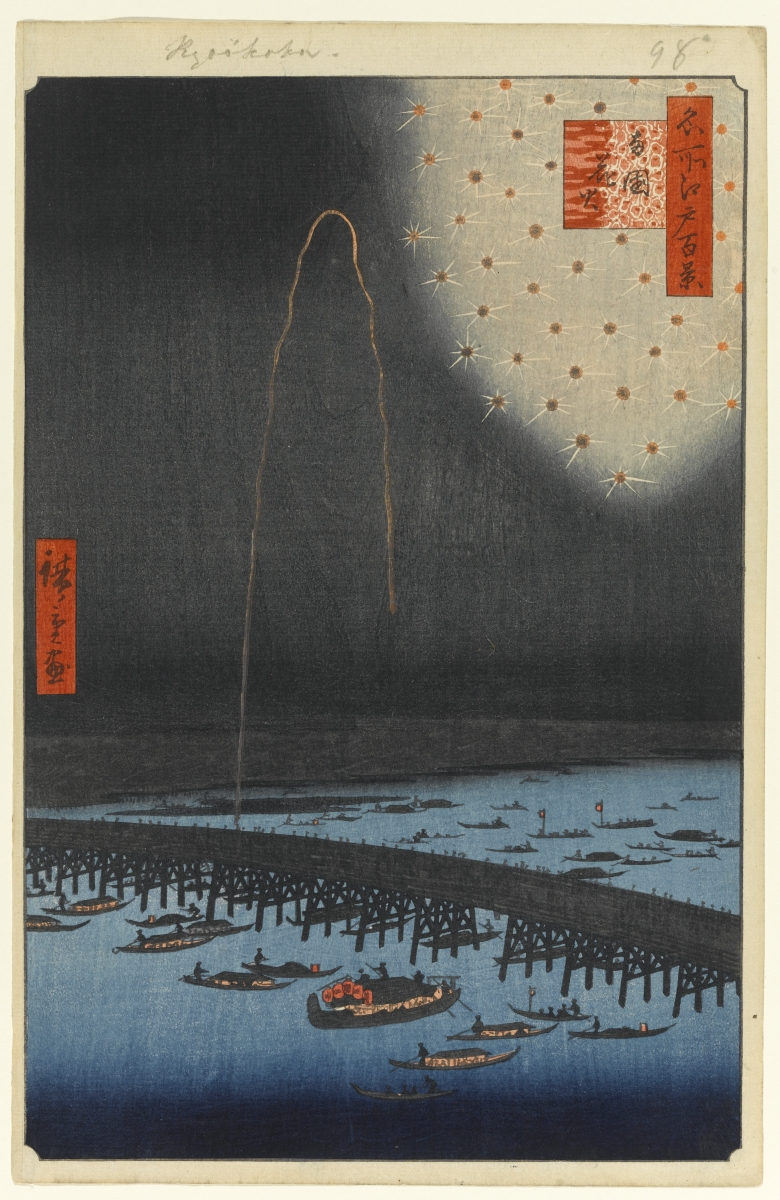
Hiroshige - Fireworks at Ryōgoku - BMA

The tradition of the Sumidagawa Fireworks Festival can be traced back to Kyōhō famine in 1732, when fireworks were launched as part of festivals for the dead. The country was in an economic crisis, and the people suffered from famine and disease to a greater degree than normal. Thus, the rituals and celebrations in which the fireworks took part played multiple roles. These were mourning observances for the dead, as well as celebrations of life, and entertainment for the poverty-stricken masses.

Originally called Ryōgoku Kawabiraki (両国川開), the display had become an established tradition by 1810, and rivalries began to emerge over control of each year's festival. The Tamaya (玉屋) and Kagiya (鍵屋) guilds of pyrotechnicians quickly became the two major rivals, initiating the tradition of the competition. Each guild would try to impress the onlookers, out-doing the other guild, in order to gain popularity and support. The number of onlookers steadily grew, and they began to shout out the names (see yagō) of their favorite fireworks artists. It has become a part of Japanese culture to yell "tamaya!" and "kagiya!" while watching fireworks.

Though the Tamaya came to enjoy steady popularity over the Kagiya, Tamaya caused a major fire in 1843, and the official support for the guild evaporated. The fireworks festivals, if they were to continue, would be moved further from the city, to a more remote and thus safer location.

The tradition survived the upheaval of the Meiji Restoration in 1868, and continued nearly every year until it dropped off in the 1920s, and ceased entirely during World War II and for several decades afterwards. Finally, in 1978, the tradition was reinstated, and continues to this day.

The 2011 festival was postponed until August 27 in the wake of the 2011 Tōhoku earthquake and tsunami.

In 2018 the festival was postponed to the following day (Sunday) due to bad weather from Typhoon Jongdari.
