= Luna Park, Tokyo =

Amusement park in Tokyo, Japan

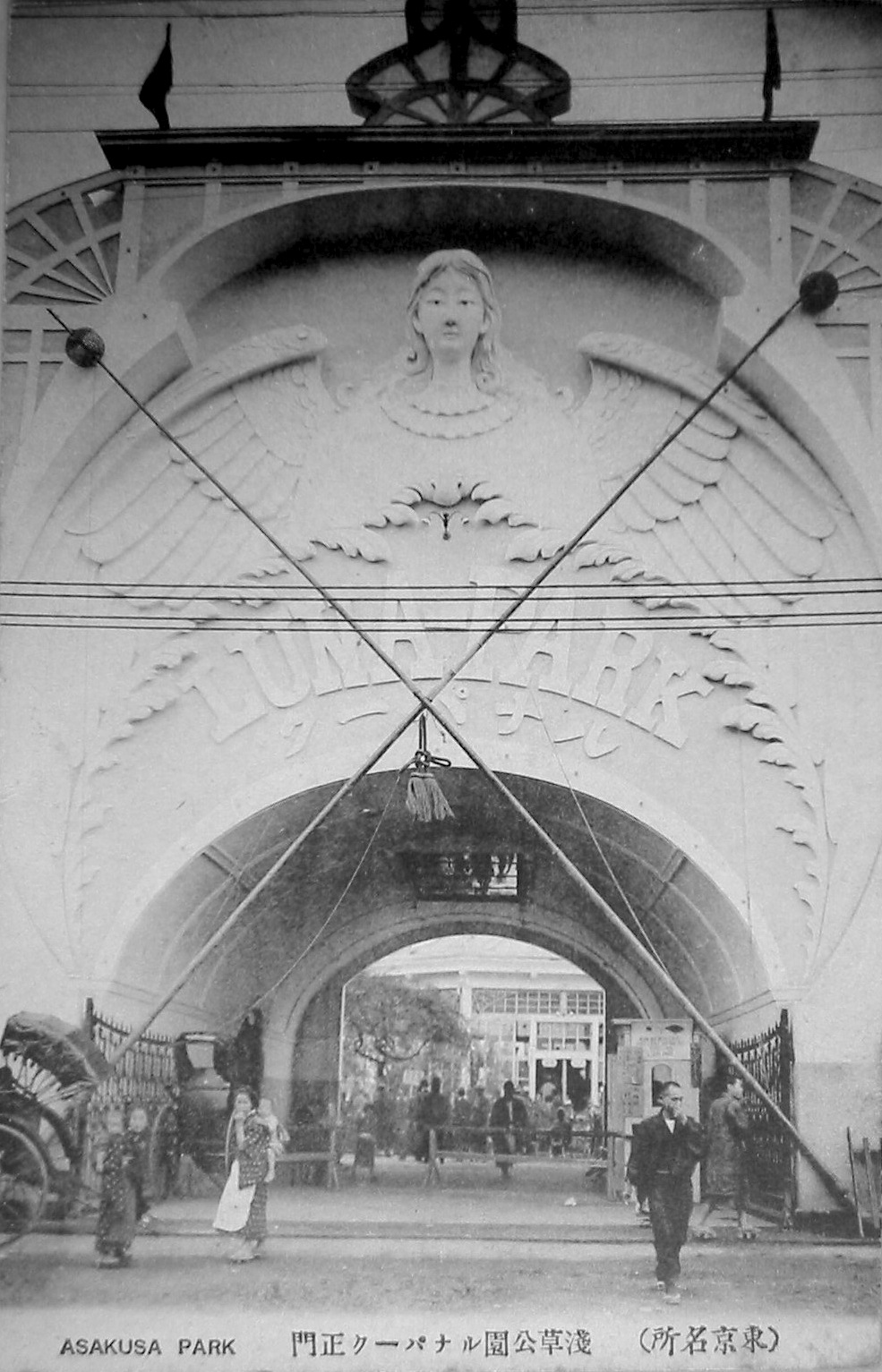
Luna Park's main gate.

In operation in 1910 and 1911, Tokyo's Luna Park (Runa pāku, also known as Asakusa Luna Park) was the first park of that name to be open in Japan. Owned and constructed by the Japanese motion picture company Yoshizawa Shōten (headed by Ken'ichi Kawaura) in the Tokyo district Asakusa, the park was designed to mimic the original Luna Park that was built in Brooklyn, New York in 1903.

Despite its popularity, the park existed for only eight months, burning down in April 1911. Luna Park was incinerated under suspicious circumstances at roughly the same time that two theaters owned by Yoshizawa Shōten also succumbed to fire in Osaka.

The trio of disasters struck Kawaura and his company at their most vulnerable time. The Japanese film industry was being besieged by inroads by a consortium of their American counterparts. Kawaura, tiring of the travails of working with Yoshizawa Shōten, sold the company to Shōkichi Umeya (owner of M. Pathe) for the equivalent of US$375,000. Kawaura then decided to build a new Luna Park, not in Tokyo but in Osaka instead. The new park opened in 1912 and stayed in business until 1923.
