= Yoshizawa Shōten =

Japanese film studio and importer

Yoshizawa Shōten (吉沢商店) was a film studio and importer active in the early years of cinema in Japan. Originally involved in the magic lantern business, Yoshizawa bought a cinématographe camera off a visiting Italian and began exhibiting motion pictures in 1897. Run by Ken'ichi Kawaura, and having an office in London, Yoshizawa soon became the most prosperous and stable of the early film companies. It was the first to manufacture motion picture equipment domestically in 1900 and it established the first permanent movie theater, the Denkikan, in Asakusa in Tokyo in 1903.

When the Russo-Japanese War broke out in 1904, Yoshizawa Shōten sent off a camera team to follow the Japanese troops. The public interest aroused by this media event allowed the studio to build more theatres around Asakusa and to build Japan's first movie studio in Meguro in Tokyo in 1909. It was even successful enough to print its own magazine, Katsudō shashinkai, and build an amusement park in Asakusa named after Luna Park in Coney Island in 1910. But when several arson incidents led to the destruction of several theatres and the Asakusa Luna Park in 1911, financial considerations prompted Yoshizawa to take part in the merger with Yokota Shōkai, M. Pathe and Fukuhōdō that formed Nikkatsu in 1912.
