= Denkikan =

First dedicated movie theater in Japan

Coordinates: 35°42′47.25″N 139°47′35.86″E

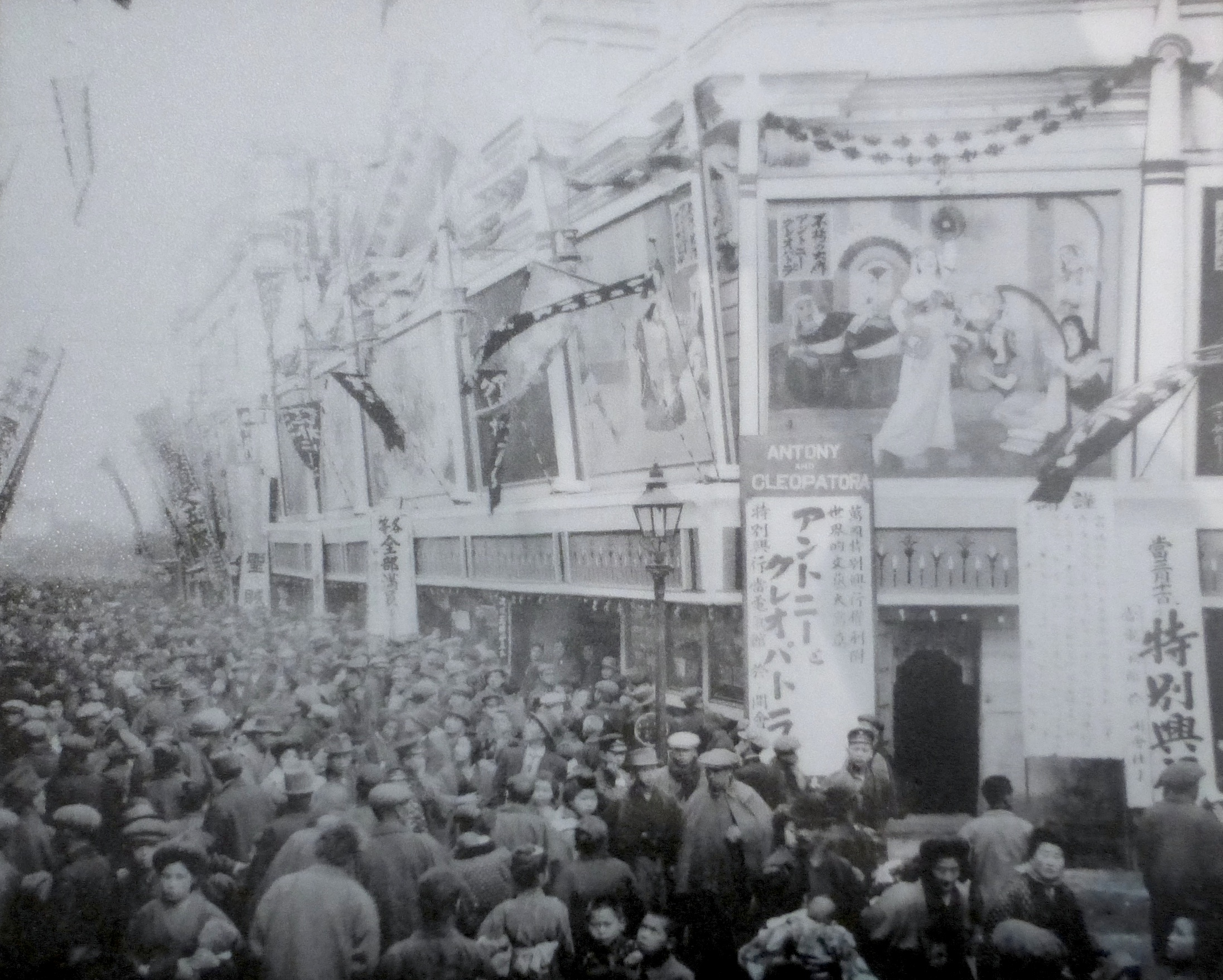
Outside of Denkikan on the opening day of Antony and Cleopatra in 1914.

The Denkikan (電気館) was the first dedicated movie theater in Japan. Originally a hall built in Asakusa's Rokku theater district to present spectacles featuring electricity ("denki" in Japanese), it was converted into a movie theater in October 1903 by Yoshizawa Shōten, the most successful of the film companies at the time. Featuring benshi such as Saburo Somei, it quickly became the symbol of the new phenomenon of the motion pictures and many cinemas around Japan were later created that borrowed the name "Denkikan." It later became a Nikkatsu theater and then a Shochiku theater before finally closing in 1976. The vacant site was used as a flea market until 1987 when a commercial and residential complex was constructed. A historically accurate model of the theater is currently on display at the Edo-Tokyo Museum in Tokyo. It is also cited in Kaizo Hayashi's film To Sleep so as to Dream.
