= Senbonza Theater =

Coordinates: 35.0270°N 135.7426°E

The Senbonza theater was a theater in Kyoto, Japan, in the late 19th century. Actor Onoe Matsunosuke worked there near the start of his career in 1889, at which time Shōzō Makino was the manager of the theater was directing there. The Yokota Shōkai film importation company often screened foreign films at the theater, which had originally been the home of a small touring kabuki group.
