= Fukuhōdō =

Japanese film studio, no longer active

Fukuhōdō (福宝堂) was a Japanese film studio active in the early years of cinema in Japan.

== Background ==
Fukuhōdō was founded in 1910 when Kenzō Tabata built a chain of modern, concrete movie theaters in Tokyo. To supply these eight theaters, Tabata started a production arm, with a studio located in Nippori. The company also enjoyed a huge success importing the French film Zigomar, which "had a major impact on Japanese film culture".

== Merger ==
Fukuhōdō was one of Japan's major motion picture companies until 1912, when it merged with Yoshizawa Shōten, Yokota Shōkai, and M. Pathe to form Nikkatsu. Some employees of Fukuhōdō who did not take part in the merger, such as Kisaburō Kobayashi, later formed Tenkatsu, exploiting the Kinemacolor color motion picture system that was acquired before the merger but which was hidden from Nikkatsu. The National Film Center of the National Museum of Modern Art, Tokyo is now located where the first Fukuhōdō theater, the Daiichi Fukuhōkan, was in Kyōbashi.
