= Inabata & Co., Ltd. =

Inabata & Co., Ltd. (稲畑産業, Inabata Sangyō) is a specialized trading company and part of the Sumitomo Chemical group. The company's main lines of business include electronic components, housing equipment, chemicals, and plastics.

Inabata & Co., based in Osaka, is one of the city's major trading companies, along with Itochu Corporation, Sumikin Bussan Corporation, Nagase & Co., Ltd., Hanwa Co., Ltd., Iwatani Corporation, and Sankyo Seiko Co.Ltd.

== History ==
=== 1890 to 1897 ===
Inabata Katsutaro established a dye store, Inabata Senryoten, in Kyoto in 1890 on his return to Japan from Lyon, France, where he had been sent as a student by the Kyoto Prefectural Government to learn state-of-the-art dyeing techniques, thus marking the beginning of Inabata & Co. In 1893, Inabata Senryoten was renamed Inabata Shoten (Inabata Trading). A year later a branch was set up in Tokyo, and then in 1897, the head office was transferred from Kyoto to Osaka. In the same year, Inabata established Inabata Dye House, using state-of-the-art dyeing technology to enter the dye processing industry.

=== 1916 to 1926 ===
Inabata imported dyes, dyeing technology and dyeing/weaving machines, industrial chemicals, and pharmaceuticals from Europe initiating also instructions in advanced dyeing techniques in Japan. In 1916, the Japanese government set up the Japan Dyestuff Manufacturing Company, which later became the foundation of Sumitomo Chemical Co., Ltd.’s specialty chemicals business. This was aimed at encouraging the domestic production of dyes, as World War I had affected the flow of supplies to the dyeing industry in Japan. Katsutaro Inabata became the president of Japan Dyestuff in 1926. Later, Inabata Shoten expanded its sales network abroad to bring Japan Dyestuff products to overseas markets. Offices were established in Brussels, Mukden, Tianjin, Shanghai, Batavia, Seoul, Quingdao, Hanoi, Dalian, Jinan, and Yogyakarta.

=== 1943 to 1976 ===
Inabata Shoten was incorporated in 1918 to become Inabata & Co., Ltd. The name was changed to Inabata Sangyo in 1943 at a time when business activities were strictly regulated due to World War II. The company's business expanded rapidly after the war, accompanying Japan's rapid economic growth. Inabata & Co., Ltd. was listed in the second section of the Osaka and Tokyo stock exchanges in 1961 and 1962 respectively, and in the first section of both exchanges in August 1973. Inabata Singapore was established in 1976 to become the first post-World War II overseas arm. The company's global network expanded to its current 50 or so overseas locations, dealing in the five areas of IT & electronics, chemicals, plastics, housing & eco materials, and foodstuffs.

=== 1976 to current ===
Inabata Pharmaceuticals becomes a significant provider of pharmaceuticals and API and merges with Sumitomo Pharmaceuticals in 1983. Licensing activity begins in 1996 with Sumitomo Pharmaceuticals, through the negotiations of Investment Banker, Paul M. Michaels, licenses Ambisome and Danisome for the Asian marketplace from a U.S. Pharmaceutical company. This is the beginning of business licensing U.S. developed drugs for the Japanese market. Additionally, an Orphan drug business is created with the assistance of Paul M. Michaels with his Japanese counterparts called Nobelpharma Co., Ltd. The first licensed product, from Teva Pharmaceuticals USA, is for the treatment of Wilson's disease in Japan. This transaction was negotiated and completed by Paul Michaels.

== Inabata Katsutaro ==
Inabata's logo “IK” remains unchanged since the company's founding, being the initials of the founder, Inabata Katsutaro (Japanese name order), as well as homonyms for “love” (ai) and “respect” (Kei) in Japanese.

Founder Inabata Katsutaro (稲畑勝太郎) (1862 – 1949) promoted Franco-Japanese cultural exchange, most notably with the establishment of the Institut Franco-Japon du Kansai (currently l’Institut français du Japon – Kansai) in 1926. The Kyoto-based institute provides French language tuition and cultural education and also serves as a center for exchange between artists and researchers from France and Japan. Inabata & Co. continues to support the activities of the institute.

Inabata is also recognized in film history as the first importer of the Lumière Brothers' cinematographe into Japan, and for running the first public exhibition of a projected cinematic apparatus in Japan.
