= Yokota Shōkai =

Japanese film company

Yokota Shōkai (横田商会) was a Japanese film studio active in the early years of cinema in Japan. Its origins can be traced back to when Einosuke Yokota received one of the first Lumiere cinematograph machines in Japan from Inabata Katsutarō to conduct traveling exhibitions of the device. In 1901, Yokota founded Yokota Shōkai and concentrated on film importing and exhibition. Around 1908, the company began contracting with Shōzō Makino and his Senbonza theater to begin creating jidaigeki (called kyūgeki at the time), which eventually made a star out of Matsunosuke Onoe. Its first studio was the Nijō Castle Studio, the second the Hokkendō Studio. In 1912, Yokota Shōkai merged with Yoshizawa Shōten, Fukuhōdō, and M. Pathe to form Nikkatsu.
