= Sumitomo Chemical =

Major Japanese chemical company

Sumitomo Chemical Co., Ltd.
- Native name: 住友化学株式会社
- Type: Public (K.K)
- Traded as: TYO: 4005; Nikkei 225 Component
- Founded: Ehime, Japan (September 22, 1913; 113 years ago)
- Headquarters: (Tokyo head office): Tokyo Sumitomo Twin Building (East), 27-1, Shinkawa 2-chome, Chūō, Tokyo 104-8260, Japan (Osaka head office): Sumitomo Building, 5-33, Kitahama 4-chome, Chūō-ku, Osaka 541-8550, Japan
- Area served: Worldwide
- Key people: Masakazu Tokura (Chairman); Keiichi Iwata (President)
- Products: Petrochemicals; Alumina products Organic chemicals IT-related chemicals Agrochemicals; Pharmaceuticals
- Revenue: ▲US$ 21.8 billion (FY 2013) (JPY 2,243 billion) (FY 2013)
- Net income: ▲US$ 359.2 million (FY 2013) (JPY 37 billion) (FY 2013)
- Number of employees: 32,542 (as of March 31, 2019)
- Website: Sumitomo Chemical global website

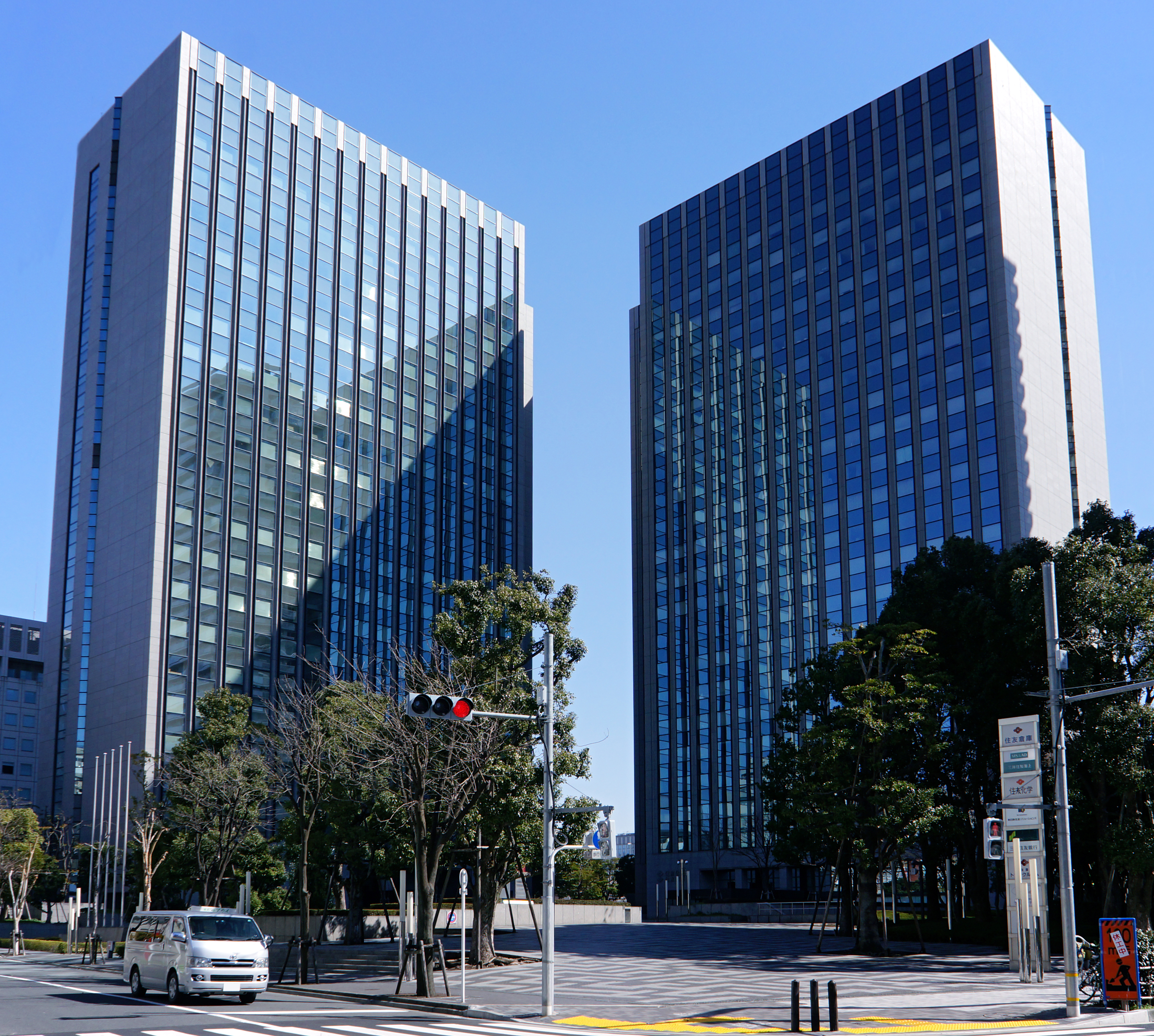
Headquarters

European headquarters near Brussels, Belgium

Sumitomo Chemical Co., Ltd. (住友化学株式会社, Sumitomo Kagaku Kabushiki-gaisha) is a major Japanese chemical company. The company is listed on the first section of the Tokyo Stock Exchange and is a constituent of the Nikkei 225 stock index. It is a member of the Sumitomo group and was founded in 1913 as a fertilizer manufacturing plant.

== Company milestones ==
- 1913: The House of Sumitomo establishes a fertilizer plant in Ehime to produce fertilizers from sulfur dioxide recovered from copper smelting emissions.
- 1915: Operations commence at the plant.
- 1925: Sumitomo Fertilizer Manufacturing Co., Ltd. is incorporated with operations at what is now the Ehime Works.
- 1934: Sumitomo Fertilizer Manufacturing changes its name to Sumitomo Chemical Co., Ltd.
- 1944: Sumitomo Chemical acquires Japan Dyestuff Manufacturing Company, starting a fine chemical business at the Osaka Works and the Oita Works.
- 1949: Sumitomo Chemical takes over the aluminum business of Sumitomo Aluminium Smelting Co., starting the integrated production of aluminum from alumina.
- 1958: Sumitomo Chemical starts petrochemical operations at its Ehime Works.
- 1965: The Takatsuki Research Laboratory is completed, serving as the Company's central laboratory. Sumitomo Chiba Chemical Co., Ltd. is established and begins petrochemical operations at the Chiba Works.
- 1971: The Takarazuka Research Center is established to reinforce research and development activities on pharmaceuticals and agricultural chemicals.
- 1976: The aluminum operation is transferred to the newly formed Sumitomo Aluminium Smelting Co., Ltd.
- 1978: The Misawa Works is opened to expand production of pyrethroid household insecticides.
- 1982: P.T. Indonesia Asahan Aluminium, a Japan-Indonesia economic cooperation project, of which Sumitomo Chemical is a member, begins aluminum smelting operations.
- 1983: Sumitomo Chemical integrates the petrochemical operations at its Ehime Works into its Chiba Works.
- 1984: Sumitomo Pharmaceuticals Co., Ltd. established by consolidating the pharmaceutical operations of Sumitomo Chemical and pharmaceuticals division of Inabata & Co., Ltd. The Petrochemical Complex in Singapore, a Japan-Singapore economic cooperation project, begins operations; Sumitomo Chemical is a leading participant, with its former chairman Norishige Hasegawa having proposed the project in 1975
- 1988: The Biochemistry & Toxicology Laboratory, subsequently renamed the Environmental Health Science Laboratory, is established in the Osaka Works.
- 1989: The Tsukuba Research Laboratory is established to reinforce research and development on new materials.
- 1997: Petrochemical Corporation of Singapore (Pte.) Ltd., an affiliate in Singapore, commences operation of a new ethylene cracker in April under its second phase expansion project, bringing the total ethylene capacity to one million tons per year, and making it the largest petrochemical complex in East Asia consisting of various downstream units.
- 1998: Facilities in Singapore for the manufacture of acrylic acid and its derivatives, including methyl methacrylate resins, under a project which Sumitomo Chemical was promoting with other Japanese companies, are completed in October.
- 2000: Sumitomo Chemical establishes Genomic Science Laboratories, operated jointly with Sumitomo Pharmaceuticals.
- 2001: Sumitomo Chemical acquires household insecticide business of Aventis Crop Science. Sumitomo Chemical establishes the IT-related Chemicals Sector as a new business sector.
- 2002: Sumitomo Chemical Takeda Agro Co., Ltd., a joint venture between Sumitomo Chemical and Takeda Chemical Industries, Ltd., succeeds Takeda Chemical’s agrochemical business and commences operation.
- 2003: Sumitomo Chemical's subsidiary Dongwoo STI Co., Ltd. commences operation of a large-scale TFT-LCD color filters production plant in Korea. Sumitomo Chemical opens LCD Polarizing film plant in Korea.
- 2004: Sumitomo Chemical opens LCD Polarizing film plant in Taiwan.
- 2005: Sumitomo Chemical establishes equally owned joint venture Rabigh Refining and Petrochemical Company (Petro Rabigh) together with Saudi Aramco. Sumitomo Pharmaceuticals and Dainippon Pharmaceuticals merged to form Dainippon Sumitomo Pharma.
- 2007: Sumitomo Chemical acquired the UK company Cambridge Display Technology, a pioneer in the development of polymer organic LEDs and related devices, and made it a wholly owned subsidiary.
- 2009: Petro Rabigh's integrated refining and petrochemical complex starts operations.
- 2010: Sumitomo Chemical acquires Indian agrochemical manufacturer New Chemi Industries Ltd with an eye to expand its crop-protection product business in India's growing market.
- 2016: Japan's Sumitomo Chemicals acquires promoters' stake in Excel Crop Care, a Mumbai-based agro-chemical manufacturer.
- 2017: Sumitomo Chemical acquires 82.9% of Botanical Resources Australia Group.

== List of chairmen ==
1. Atsushi Oya (1941–1947)
2. Masaharu Doi (1947–1963)
3. Norishige Hasegawa (1965–1977)
4. Takeshi Hijikata (1977–1985)
5. Hero Mori (1985–1993)
6. Akio Kasai (1993–2000)
7. Hiromasa Yonekura (2000–2009)
8. Hiroshi Hirose (2009–2011)
9. Masakazu Tokura (2011–2019)
10. Keiichi Iwata (2019–present)
