= Kappa-dera =

Buddhist temple in Tokyo, Japan

- かっぱ寺
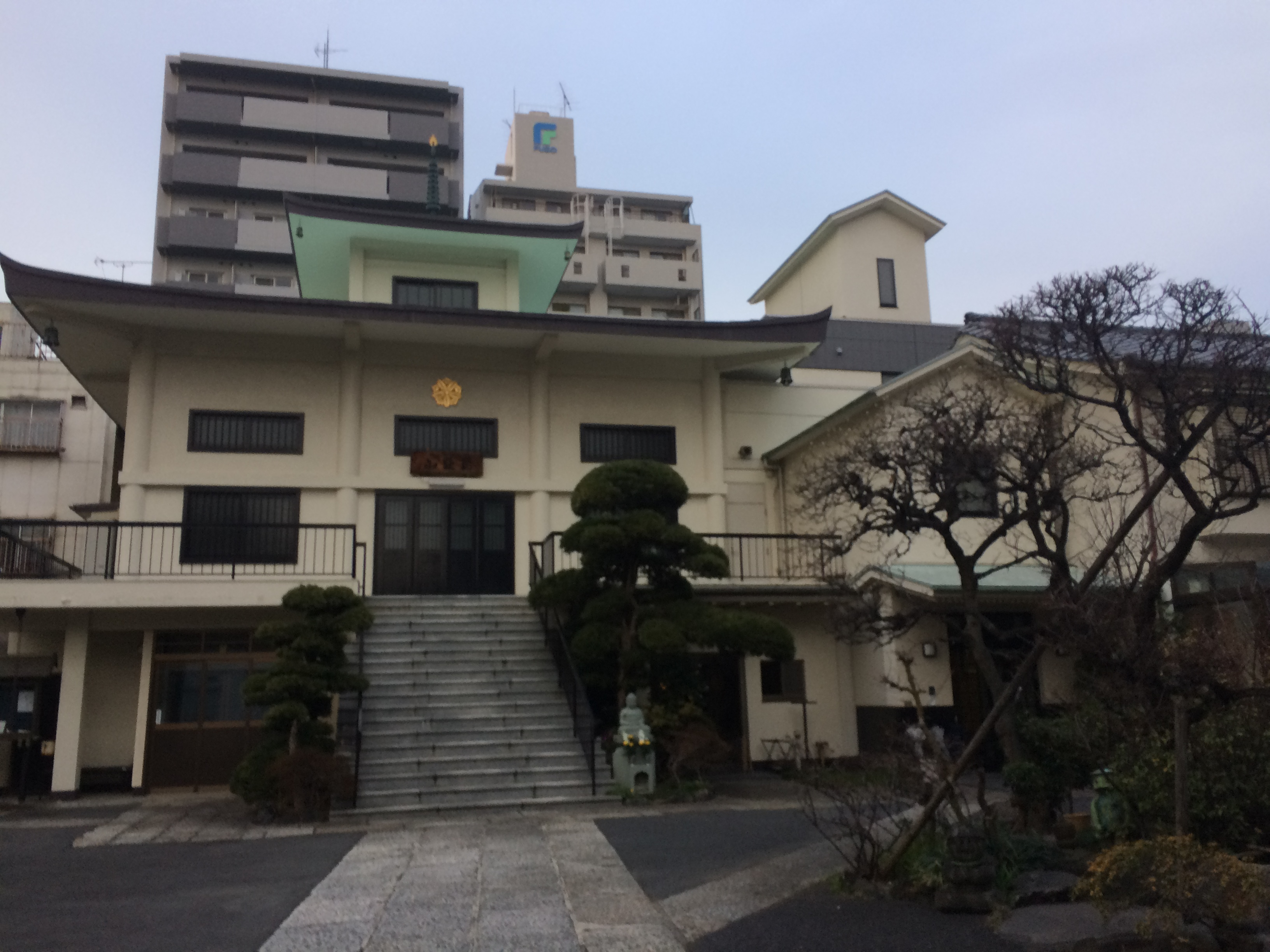
- Kappa-dera

Religion
- Affiliation: Buddhism
- Sect: Sōtō
- Deity: Shakyamuni Buddha

Location
- Location: 3-7-2 Matsugaya, Taitō, Tokyo
- Country: Japan
- Interactive map of Kappa-dera
- Coordinates: 35°42′55″N 139°47′11″E

Kappa-dera (かっぱ寺), officially known as Sōgen Temple (曹源寺, "Sōgen-ji"), is a Sōtō Zen Buddhist temple in the Kappabashi area of Tokyo. It is named after the kappa, a Japanese folklore figure, and Kappa (合羽), a vendor in the retail corridor.

== History ==
The temple was founded as a Sōtō Zen temple first built in the Marunouchi area of Tokyo in 1588. It changed location several times, moving to Yushima Tenman-gū because of the Edo Castle expansion in 1591. Finally in 1657 the Great fire of Meireki burned down most of the temple and it was moved to the current area in Matsugaya. Historically, this area near Asakusa was prone to frequent flooding due to its proximity to the Sumida River, which would overflow its banks from Edo Bay. In the 1800s, a local umbrella and raincoat merchant named Kihachi Kappaya started an effort to create a system to reduce the amount of destructive flooding in the area. He invested his own capital to create embankments and a pedestrian bridge.

There are several folktales about the building of this flood reduction setup that included controlled canal water drainage and bridge systems. Many tales describe Kihachi receiving assistance to complete this project from a kappa, the Japanese folklore figure. Other tales speak of impoverished samurai who would sell kappa raincoats near the bridge and that soldiers would hang their raincoats to dry near the bridge. It is on the site of the bridge in these tales that the current temple is said to be built. When Kihachi Kappaya died in 1814 he was buried at the temple, at this point also known as Kappaya Kawataro, another name for kappas and a joke meaning "kappa-selling kappa".

== Modern ==
In modern times, the temple is mostly known by its nickname, Kappa-dera, in relation to its location in Kappabashi, where the name trace its origins to both the name of a raincoat merchant (ja:合羽) and the kappa folklore. The temple contains what is described as a mummified hand of a kappa. The ceiling of the hall is decorated with illustrations by artists such as Osamu Tezuka.

Kappa statues and depictions in a variety of forms surround the neighborhood and shopping district near the temple. This area is known as Kappabashi and celebrates the kappa which they have made their mascot. The temple grounds are open daily to tourists, although the building is not open to the public. Cucumber offerings are often made to the kappas at the shrine, both to appease them and for businesses related to water.

== Gallery ==
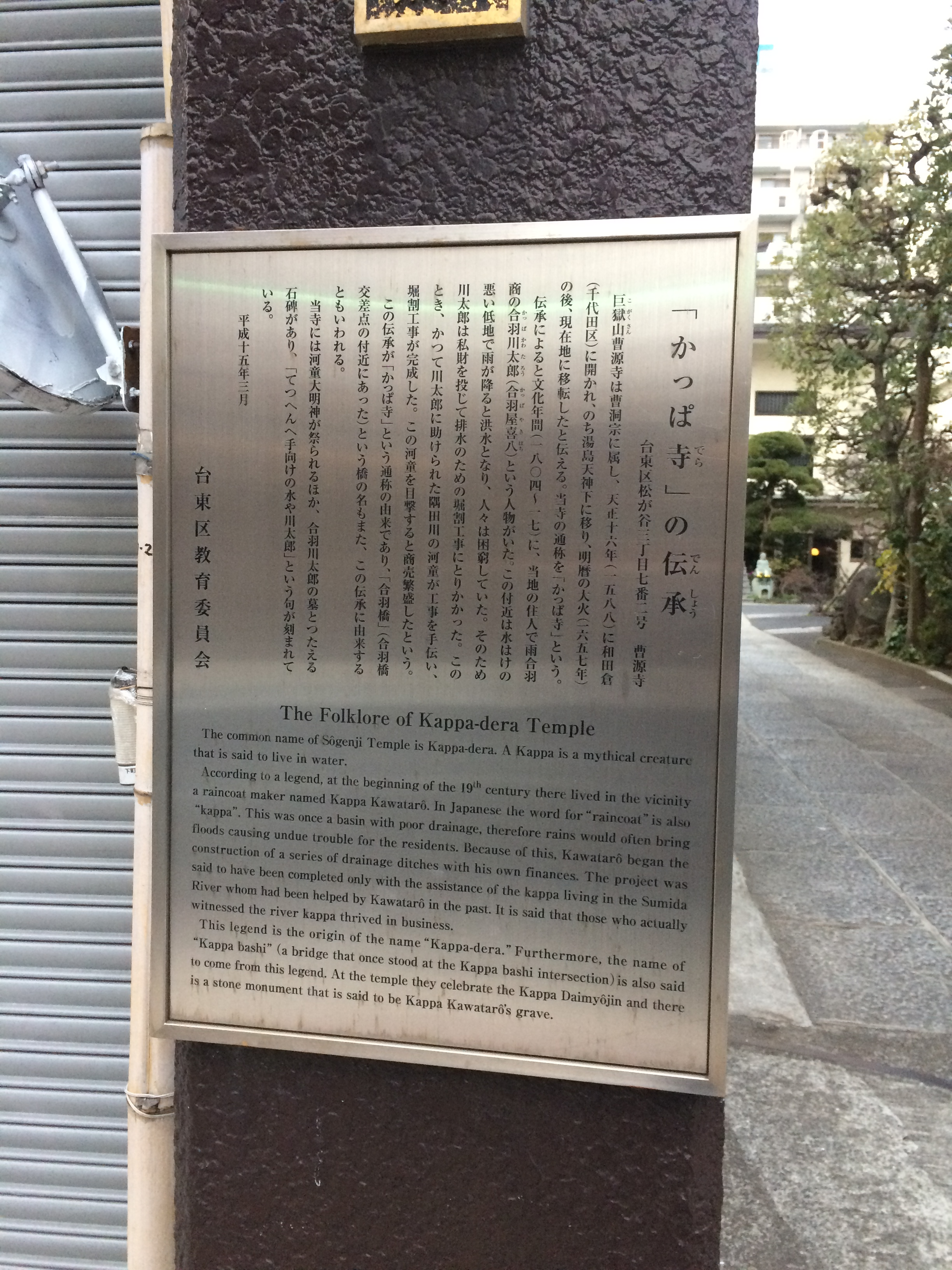
Plaque describing folklore

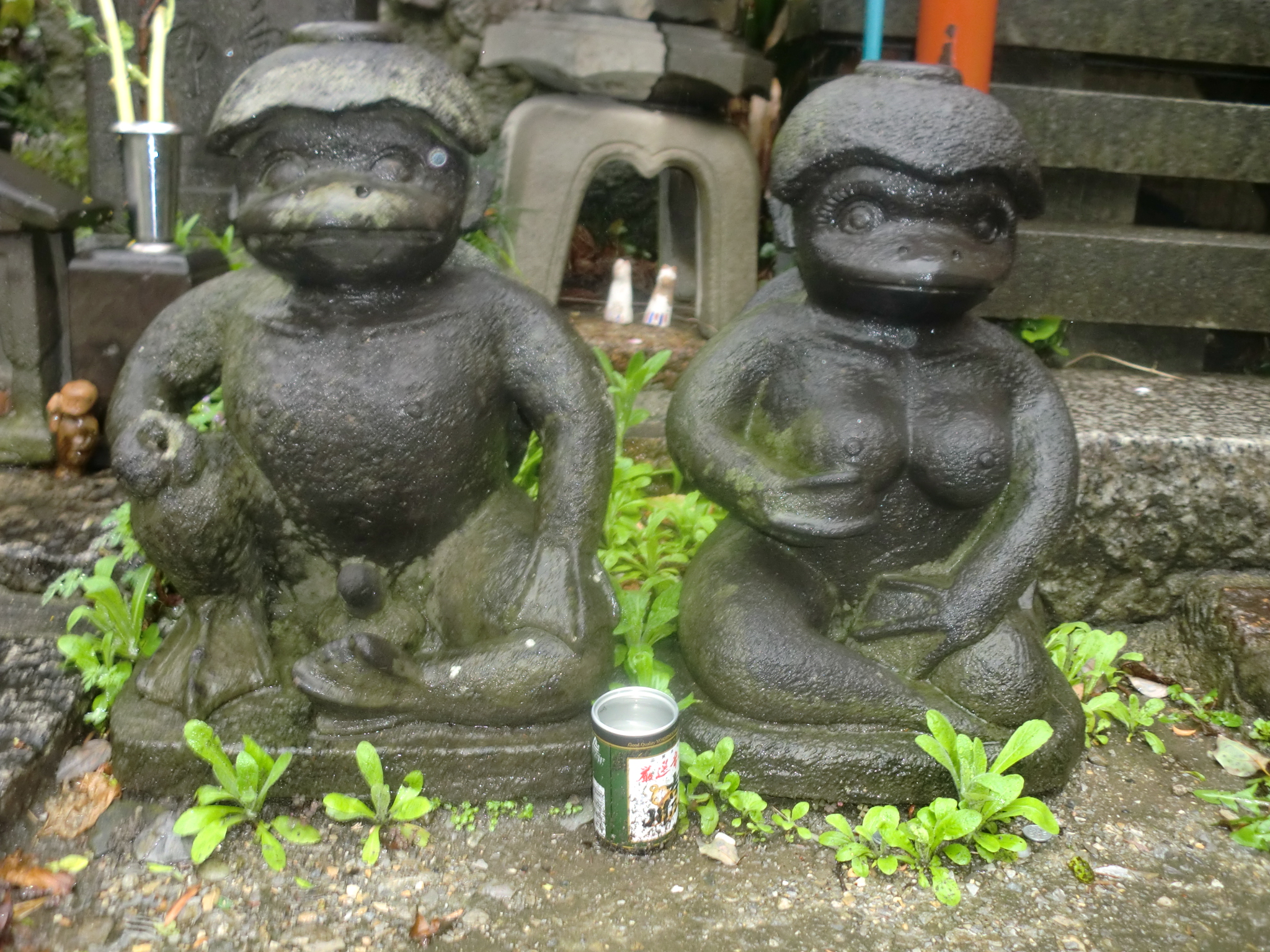
Kappa statues

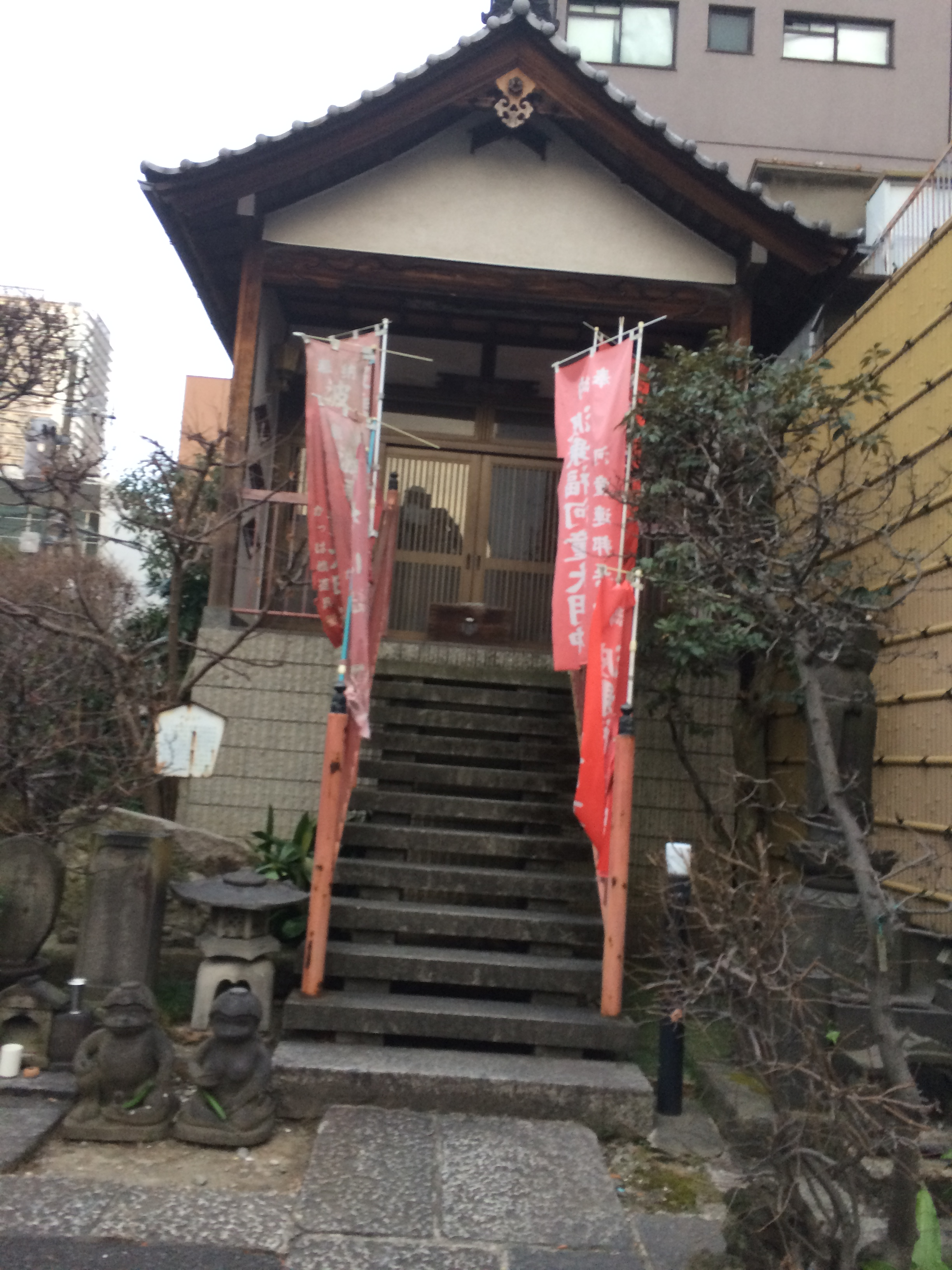
Kappa shrine at the temple

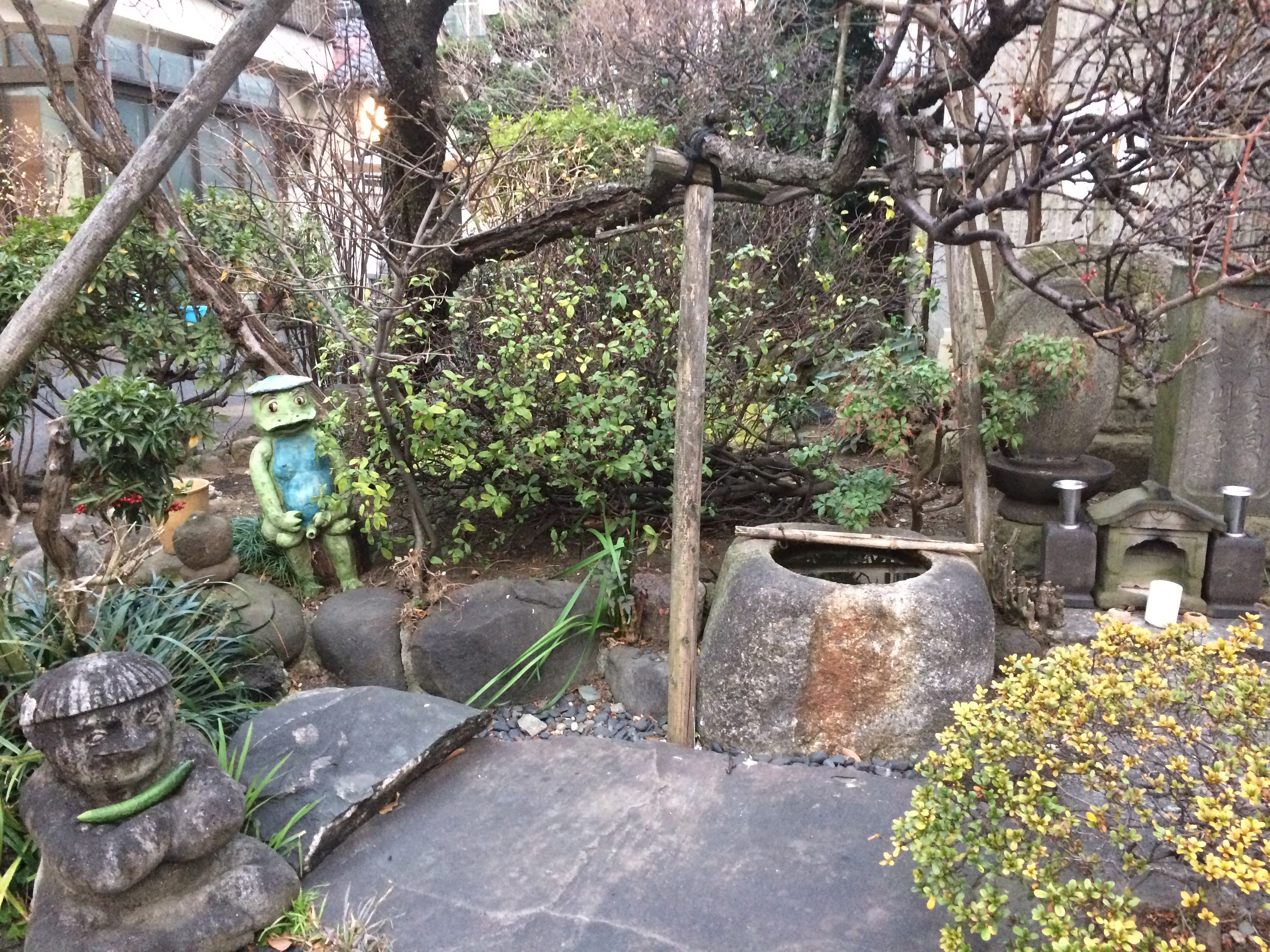
Garden with Kihachi Kappaya grave

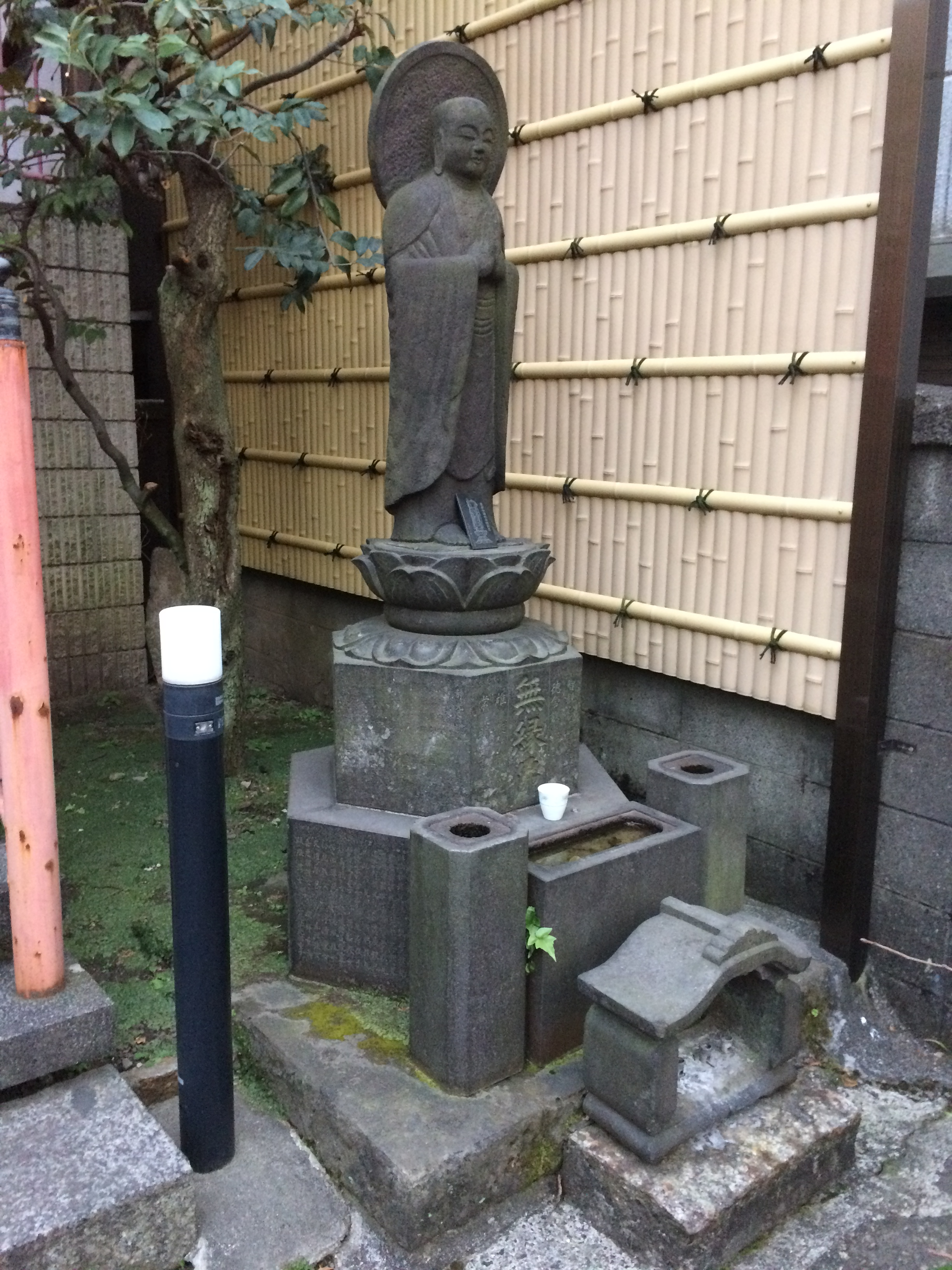
Buddha statue

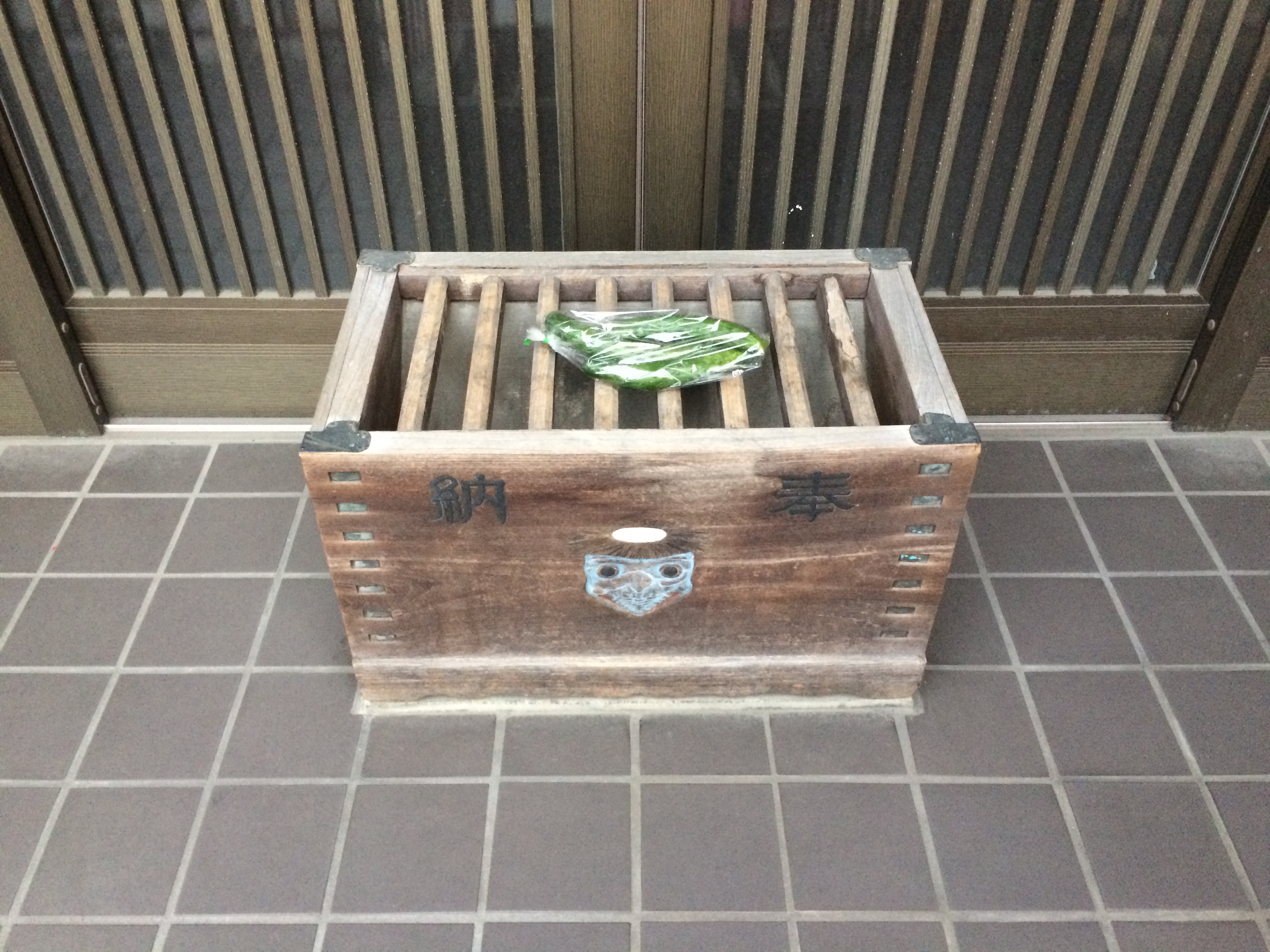
Cucumber offering
