= Kappabashi-dori =

Tokyo market street

Coordinates: 35°42′52″N 139°47′20″E

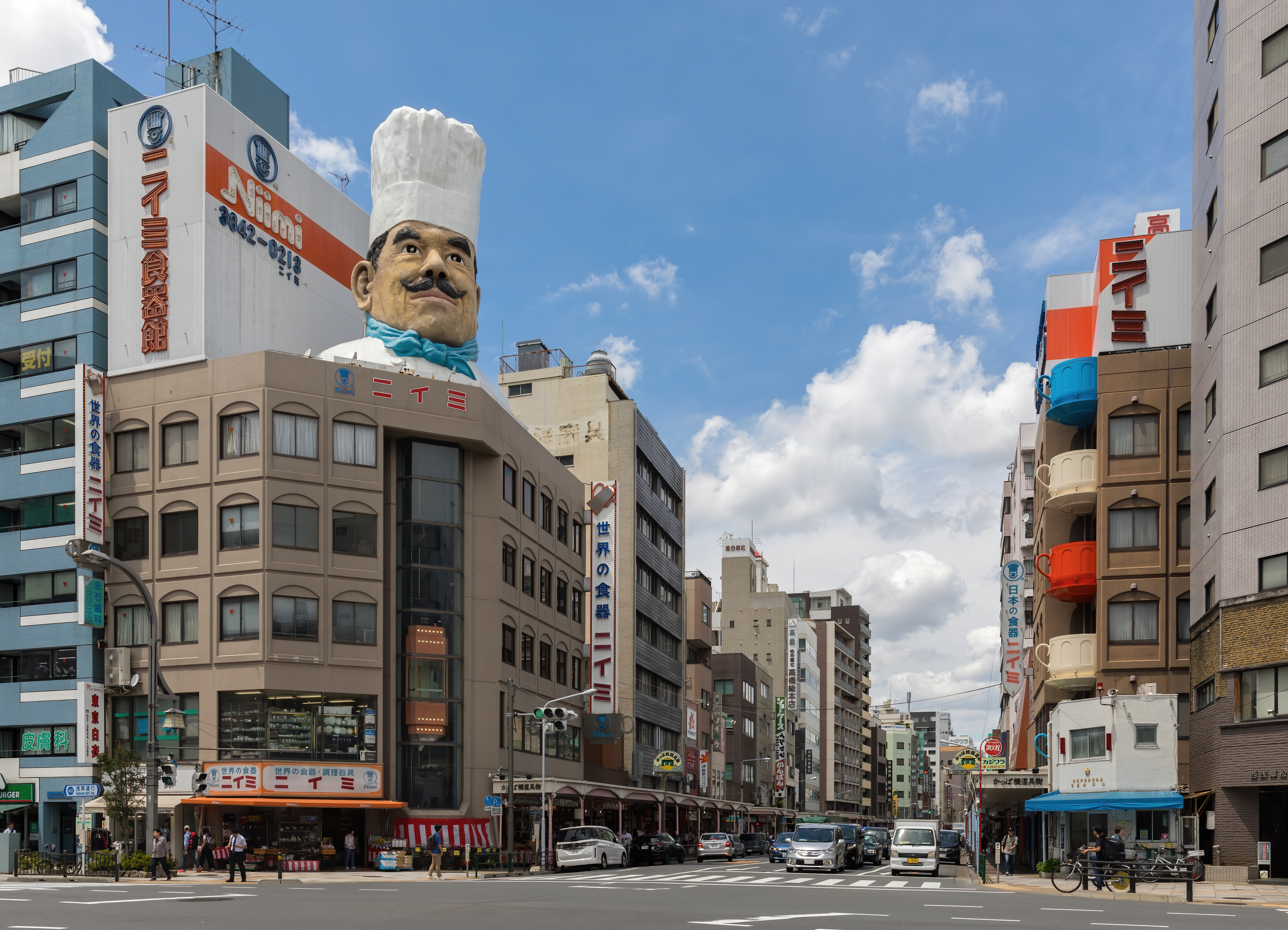
A giant chef marks the entrance to the southern end of Kappabashi-dori

Kappabashi-dori, also known just as Kappabashi (Japanese: 合羽橋) or Kitchen Town, is a street in Tokyo between Ueno and Asakusa which is almost entirely populated with shops supplying the restaurant trade. These shops sell everything from knives and other kitchen utensils, mass-produced crockery, restaurant furniture, ovens, and decorations, through to esoteric items such as the plastic display food (sampuru, derived from English sample) found outside Japanese restaurants. The street is also an off-beat tourist destination.

Nearby is located Kappa-dera, where locals offer cucumber to appease the Kappas.

== Etymology ==
The street's name is believed to come from either the raincoats (kappa 合羽) of nearby residents which were hung out to dry on the bridge, or from a merchant named Kihachi Kappaya who funded the project to build Shinhorikawa River for water management. However, as the name is a homophone with the popular mythical creature, kappa (河童), the shops along the street have officially adopted the kappa as their mascot. Images of kappa appear frequently in the area, from merchandise to displays and websites about the district, often written in hiragana as かっぱ rather than in kanji.

== Transportation ==
The closest station is Tawaramachi Station on the Subway Ginza Line.
