= Kiuchi Kyō =

Japanese educator and politician

- 木内 キヤウ
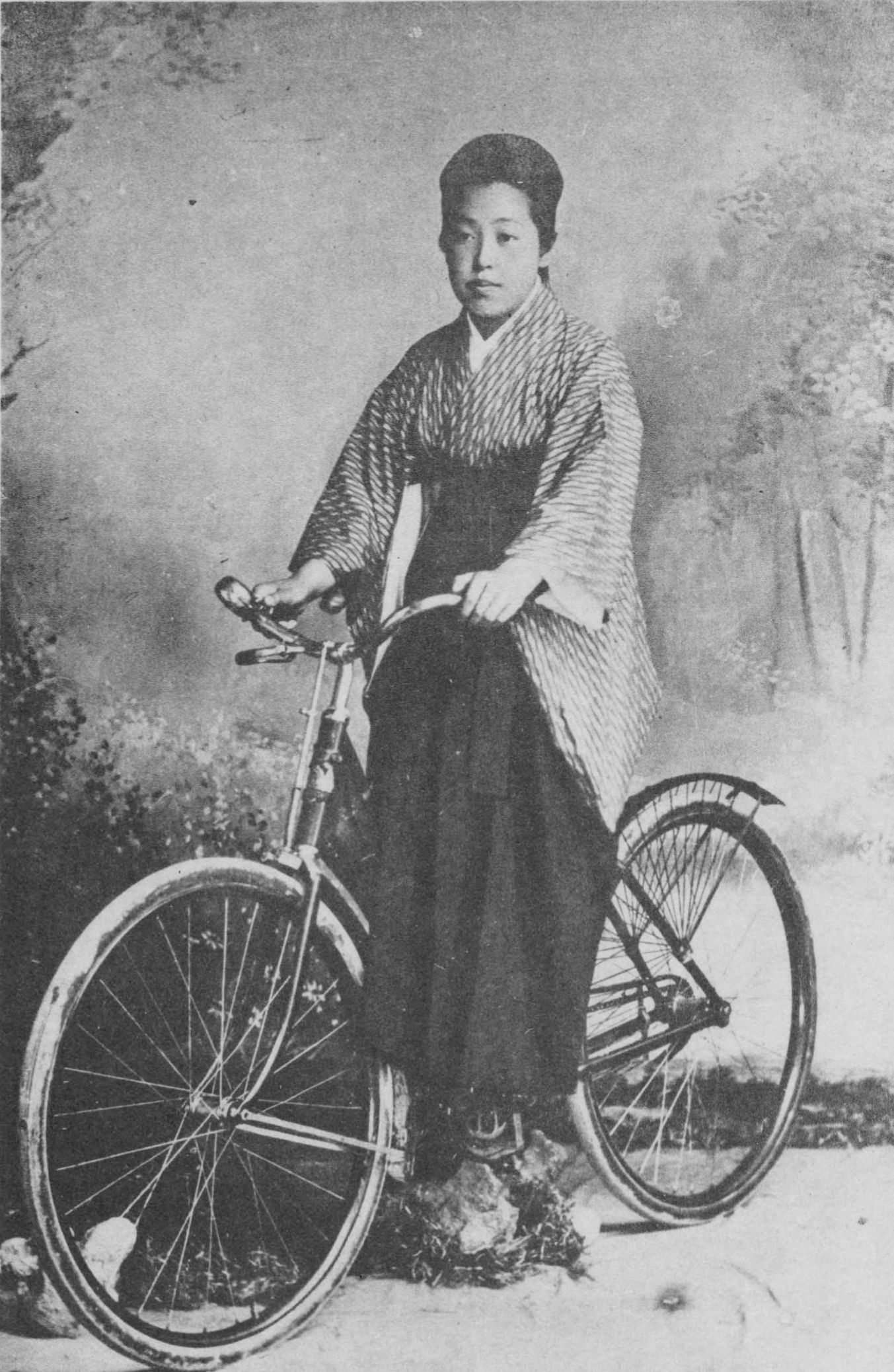

Member of the House of Councillors
- In office 3 May 1947 – 2 May 1953
- Preceded by: Constituency established
- Succeeded by: Multi-member district
- Constituency: National district

Personal details
- Born: 14 February 1884 Asakusa, Tokyo, Japan
- Died: 7 November 1964 (aged 80)
- Party: Minshu Club
- Spouse: Tatsusaburō Kiuchi (m. 1909)
- Parent: Awashima Kangetsu (father)
- Education: Tokyo Women's Normal School

Kiuchi Kyō (木内 キヤウ, Kiuchi Kyō; 14 February 1884 – 7 November 1964) was a Japanese educator and politician who served as a member of the House of Councillors. She is believed to be the first woman to become the principal of a Japanese school.

Her maiden surname was Awashima (淡島), and her pen name was Tsukigami Kiuchi (木内月上, Kiuchi Tsukigami).

== Early life and education ==
Kiuchi Kyō was born on 14 February 1884 in the Asakusa Morishita town in the Asakusa ward of Tokyo, the first-born child of artist Awashima Kangetsu. The Awashima family business was a well-known honeycomb toffee shop, but they made a living by charging rent for the remaining estate and selling it, such as giving up the store with her grandparents.

Even when she was nine years old, her father did not allow her to enter elementary school. Worried after her graduation from high school, she attended a normal school, and she graduated from Tokyo Women's Normal School in March 1903 and was assigned to Minamikatsushika Ordinary Primary School.

== Career ==
In March 1909, she married Tatsusaburō Kiuchi (木内辰三郎, Kiuchi Tatsusaburō), a teacher at Urawa Junior High School, and she chose to maintain her work–life balance. In April 1910, she was transferred to Nihonbashi-no-Jōtō Ordinary Elementary School. She entered the Tokyo Women's Normal School's advanced courses in April 1926, and after completing the course, she was transferred to Jūon Ordinary Primary School. In October 1931, she became the principal of Itabashi no Shimura First Ordinary Primary School of Itabashi, and she remained in that position until July 1941. She also founded Kiuchi Academy in Takinogawa and served as the head of a pigeon garden.

She was also vice-president of the National Primary School Union's Female Teachers Association, director of the Tokyo Education Association's Women's Training Department, a member of the Japan International Association's Women's Committee, director of the Tokyo Women's Patriotic Association, and a councillor of the Dai Nippon Women's Association. She was a representative of the 1928 Pan-Pacific Women's Conference in Hawaii. During World War II, she became a member of the Imperial Rule Assistance Association's Central Cooperation Council.

== Political career ==
After an unsuccessful attempt in the 1946 Japanese general election, where she received 21,185 votes for the House of Councillors national district among 120 candidates, she was elected to the House of Councillors national district in the 1947 Japanese House of Councillors election. She was a member of the Minshu Club and dedicated herself to issues involving education and female teachers.

== Later life and death ==
Kiuchi Kyō died on 7 November 1964 at the age of 80.

== Bibliography ==
- Kiuchi, Kyō (1929). 汎太平洋婦人会議に列して (in Japanese).
