= Inabata Katsutaro =

Japanese politician

- 稲畑 勝太郎
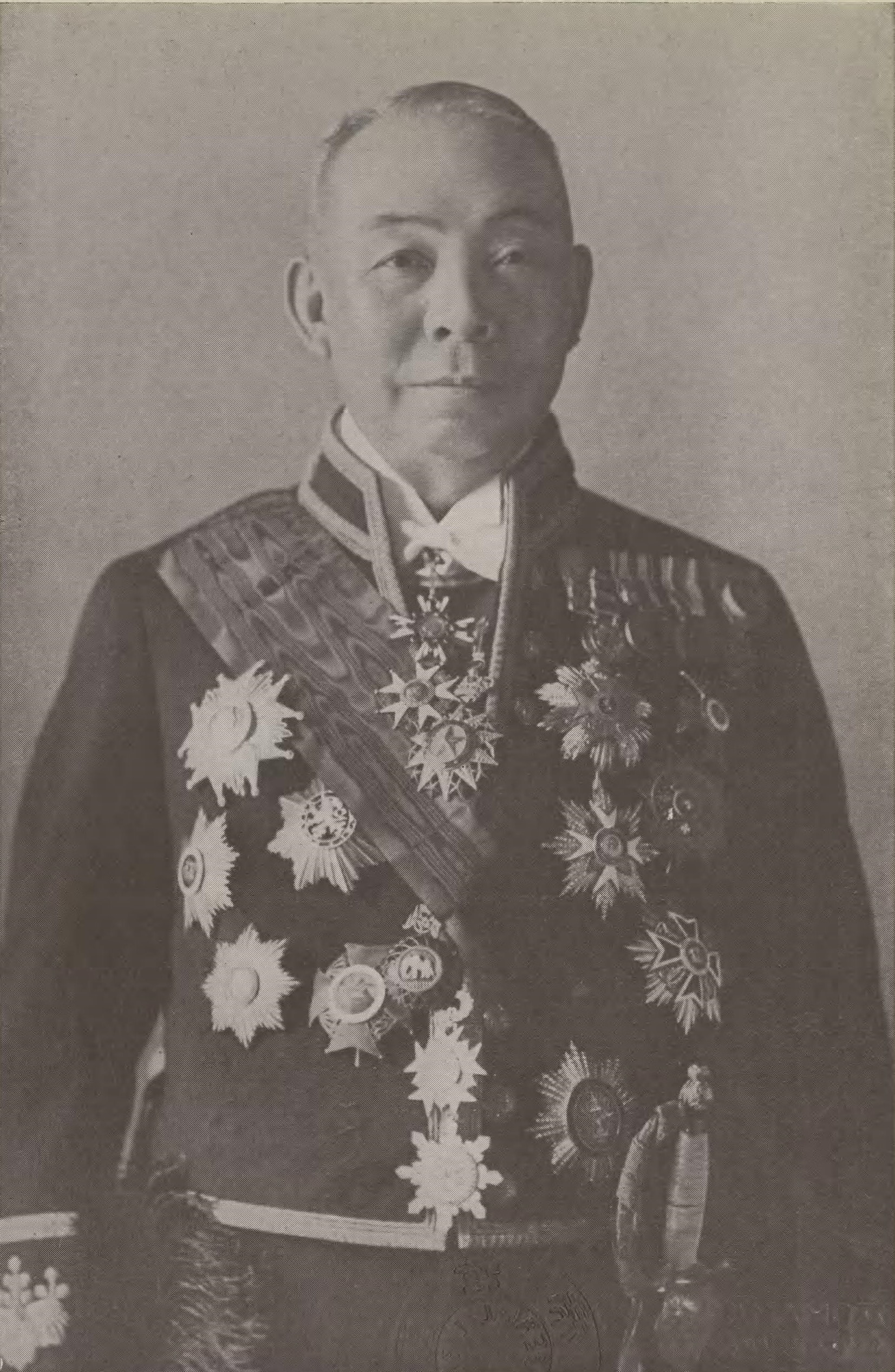
- Inabata Katsutarō

Member of the House of Peers
- In office 29 January 1926 – 2 May 1947 Nominated by the Emperor

Personal details
- Born: 30 October 1862 Kyoto, Yamashiro, Japan
- Died: 29 March 1949 (aged 86)
- Occupation: Industrialist, film pioneer

Inabata Katsutaro (稲畑勝太郎, Inabata Katsutarō; 30 October 1862 – 29 March 1949) was a Japanese industrialist and film pioneer.

== Career ==
Born to a Kyoto family that ran a long-standing wagashi store, Inabata attended the Kyoto-fu Shihan Gakkō (now the Kyoto University of Education) and in 1877 earned a scholarship to attend the La Martinière technical school in Lyon. One of his classmates there was Auguste Lumière, who was later one of the inventors of the cinematographe. After studying weaving and dying technology for eight years, Inabata returned to Japan in 1885 and, after teaching others about what he learned, started his own company, Inabata Senryōten (later Inabata & Co., Ltd.), in 1890. He later moved the company to Osaka and focused his business on dying military uniforms. Achieving success, Inabata later served as president of the Osaka Chamber of Commerce and Industry (OCCI) from 1922 to 1934, and became a member of the House of Peers. A bronze statue of him still stands in front of the OCCI. Inabata was also instrumental in the founding of the Institut Franco-Japon du Kansai (currently l’Institut français du Japon – Kansai) in 1926.

== Film business ==
When Inabata returned to France in 1896, he met Lumière again and learned about the motion picture apparatus that he and his brother Louis had developed. Interested in the business opportunity, Inabata returned to Japan with a cinematographe, fifty reels of film, and François-Constant Girel, a Lumière technician. They then offered "the first paid exhibition of what was then called 'jido shashin' [moving pictures]" at the Nanchi Enbujo Theater in Osaka on 15 February 1897. Although Thomas Edison's kinetoscope had been presented in Kobe the previous year, that was not a device for projecting motion pictures, so Inabata's screening is regarded as Japan's "first projected film programme". Since the cinematographe could both project and shoot motion pictures, Inabata was also the first Japanese to be involved in the shooting of films, some of which featured him and his family. He soon found the film business distasteful, however, and handed it over to Einosuke Yokota, who later founded Yokota Shōkai, one of Japan's first film studios.
