= Shōkichi Umeya =

Japanese film producer (1868–1934)

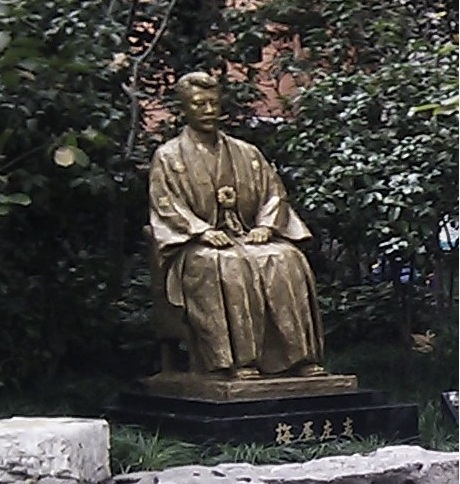

Chinese name
- Traditional Chinese: 梅屋莊吉
- Simplified Chinese: 梅屋庄吉
Transcriptions

Japanese name
- Kanji: 梅屋庄吉
- Hiragana: うめや しょうきち

Shōkichi Umeya (梅屋 庄吉, Umeya Shōkichi) (January 8 1869 – November 23 1934) was a Japanese film promoter and producer who financially supported Sun Yat-sen's revolutionary activities over a period of nearly 20 years. In 1906 he founded the early Japanese film production company M. Pathe.

== Biography ==
Umeya was a pan-Asianist activist.

Umeya was born in 1868 to a merchant family in Nagasaki. In 1882, he took his first trip abroad, going to Shanghai. There, he was both impressed by the city's Euro-American aspects and also witnessed the city's semi-colonial nature, racism, and inequality.

In his early 20s, Umeya worked in his family's international business, selling rice in Korea and speculating on gold mining in China. In 1891, having experienced a series of business losses, he relocated to Amoy and then to Singapore, where he opened a photography studio.

By 1895, Umeya had relocated his family and photography studio to Hong Kong. He first met Sun Yat-sen in 1895 in Hong Kong and became a supporter of Sun's revolutionary cause. Umeya began contributing funds to Sun's revolutionary activities and helped to secure weapons for the aborted Canton Uprising in 1895. In 1903, Umeya fled the authorities and went to Singapore. Drawing on his contacts with Sun's network, he entered the film exhibition business in order to help generate funds and popular support for the revolution.

Umeya's film exhibition business became extremely profitable through showing news films about the Russo-Japanese War (1904-1905). Audiences were enthused to see the success of a rising Asian power on the film screen.

Returning to Japan in 1906, Umeya founded one of Japan's earliest film companies, M. Pathé. He named the film company after the French company Pathé Frères. Umeya used his profits to fund Sun's revolutionary activities, including providing financial support for the Mingbao newspaper. Purportedly based on Sun's suggestion to use cinema for the public benefit, Umeya sought to connect film to the development of science, industry, and education. As a result, M. Pathe in 1906, M. Pathe imported more than 120 educational and scientific films form Europe.

In 1911, Umeya published A Treasured Encyclopedia of Moving Pictures, which provided synopses of approximately 400 scientific and educational films.

M. Pathe documented the success of the 1911 Xinhai Revolution beginning with the Wuchang uprising and leading to Sun's inauguration, producing three documentary films that covered the revolution.

== See also ==
- Tōten Miyazaki, another Japanese supporter of Sun Yat-sen.
