= Nikkatsu =

Japanese film and television company

Nikkatsu Corporation
- Logo used since 2007

- Headquarters in Bunkyō, Tokyo
- Native name: 日活株式会社
- Romanized name: Nikkatsu Kabushiki-gaisha
- Type: Private KK
- Industry: Television production and film
- Predecessor: Yoshizawa Shōten; Yokota Shōkai; Fukuhōdō; M. Pathe
- Founded: 1912; 114 years ago
- Headquarters: Hongō, Bunkyō, Tokyo, Japan
- Owner: Nippon Television Holdings (35%); SKY Perfect JSAT (28.4%)
- Subsidiaries: Django Films
- Website: www.nikkatsu.com

Nikkatsu Corporation (日活株式会社, Nikkatsu Kabushiki-gaisha) is a Japanese film studio located in Bunkyō. The name Nikkatsu amalgamates the words Nippon Katsudō Shashin, literally "Japan Motion Pictures".

Shareholders are Nippon Television Holdings (35%) and SKY Perfect JSAT Corporation (28.4%).

== History ==
=== Founding in 1912 ===
Nikkatsu is Japan's oldest major movie studio, having been founded on September 10, 1912, when several production companies and theater chains, Yoshizawa Shōten, Yokota Shōkai, Fukuhōdō and M. Pathe, consolidated under the name Nippon Katsudō Shashin. The company enjoyed its share of success. It employed such notable film directors as Shozo Makino and his son Masahiro Makino.

During World War II, the government ordered the ten film companies that had formed by 1941 to consolidate into two. Masaichi Nagata, founder of Daiei Film and a former Nikkatsu employee, counter-proposed that three companies be formed and the suggestion was approved. Nikkatsu, set to merge with the two weakest companies, Shinkō Kinema and Daito, were verbally displeased. The committee formed to establish the value of each company retaliated by purposefully undervaluing Nikkatsu, which led to Shinkō becoming the dominant head of production. The reformed Nikkatsu continued to prosper as an exhibition company but ceased all film production.

The postwar film industry expanded rapidly and, in 1951, Nikkatsu president Kyusaku Hori began construction of a new production studio. A graduate of Tokyo Keizai University, Hori had joined the company in 1951 after quitting his initial employment as the manager of Sanno Hotel (now rebuilt as Sanno Park Tower).

=== Golden Age ===
Under Hori, Nikkatsu is considered to have had its "Golden Age". The company began making movies again in 1954. Many assistant directors from other studios, including Shōhei Imamura and Seijun Suzuki from Shochiku, moved to Nikkatsu with the promise of advancement to full director status within one or two years. Suzuki made dozens of films for Nikkatsu from 1956 onwards, developing an increasingly inventive visual style, but was controversially fired following the release of his 40th, Branded to Kill (1967), which Hori deemed "incomprehensible".

The company made a few samurai films and historical dramas but by 1960 had decided to devote its resources to the production of urban youth dramas, comedy, action and gangster films. From the late 1950s to the start of the 1970s, they were renowned for their "borderless action" (mukokuseki akushun) movies, designed for the youth market, whose directors included Suzuki, Toshio Masuda, and Takashi Nomura. The studio also employed such stars as Yujiro Ishihara, Akira Kobayashi, Joe Shishido, Tetsuya Watari, Ruriko Asaoka, Chieko Matsubara and, later, Meiko Kaji and Tatsuya Fuji. Director Shōhei Imamura began his career there and between 1958 and 1966 made for them such notable films as Pigs and Battleships (1961), The Insect Woman (1963) and The Pornographers (1966).

=== Daikaiju genre ===
Strangely during the height of the popularity of Japan's 1960s daikaiju (giant monster) genre, Nikkatsu only produced one Godzilla-type monster movie, 1967's Daikyoju Gappa (Giant Beast Gappa), released internationally as Gappa: The Triphibian Monster and Monster from a Prehistoric Planet, a film generally regarded as a remake of the 1961 British film Gorgo.

=== Roman Porno ===
By 1971 the increased popularity of television had taken a heavy toll on the film industry and in order to remain profitable Nikkatsu turned to the production of Roman Porno, which focus on sex, violence, S&M and romance. Hori resigned over the change in focus, and many stars and directors left the company. A few, including the film directors Yasuharu Hasebe, Keiichi Ozawa, Shōgorō Nishimura, and Koreyoshi Kurahara, stayed. It also witnessed the emergence of such new directors as Tatsumi Kumashiro, Masaru Konuma and Chūsei Sone.

Between 1974 and 1986, Nikkatsu promoted a number of their leading Roman Porno actresses of the popular BDSM niche under the epithet "SM Queen" (SMの女王, SM no joō). They include Naomi Tani (1974–1979), Junko Mabuki (1980–1981), Izumi Shima (1982–1983), Nami Matsukawa (1983), Miki Takakura (1983–1985), and Ran Masaki (1985-1986).

The advent of home video brought an end to active production at Nikkatsu. In July 1988, it abandoned producing Roman Porno with Bed Partner (1988) being the last release in the venerable 17-year Roman Porno series. It reverted to its pre-1971 policy but stopped production again in November 1988. Nikkatsu declared bankruptcy in 1993.

=== Sushi Typhoon ===
In 2005, the company was sold to Index Holdings and in 2010, a revived Nikkatsu studio announced new production of Sushi Typhoon, a movie series made in partnership with a U.S. distributor. The Sushi Typhoon arm of Nikkatsu creates low-budget horror, science fiction, and fantasy films aimed at an international audience. By 2011, the company had produced seven feature films.

=== Later history ===
On March 3, 2025, Nikkatsu announced the establishment of NK Animation which would continue to handle the company's animation planning and production division.

== Ownership ==
- 1912 Nippon Katsudō Shashin K.K. was established by the merger of four film companies: Yoshizawa Shōten, Yokota Shōkai, Fukuhōdō and M. Pathe.
- 1993 applied for Corporate Reorganization Act.
- 1996 acquired by a Japanese leisure company Namco.
- 2005 sold to Index Holdings, a Japanese holding company which has interests in media contents industries.

== Actors from Nikkatsu ==
Male

- Yujiro Ishihara
- Akira Kobayashi
- Keiichirō Akagi
- Joe Shishido
- Mitsuo Hamada
- Kōji Wada
- Hiroyuki Nagato
- Tamio Kawachi
- Hideaki Nitani
- Tatsuya Fuji
- Tetsuya Watari
- Hideki Takahashi
- Masahiko Tsugawa
- Akira Nakao
- Eiji Go
- Ryōtarō Sugi
- Masaya Oki

Female

- Ruriko Asaoka
- Izumi Ashikawa
- Mie Kitahara
- Yōko Minamida
- Masako Izumi
- Mari Shiraki
- Chieko Matsubara
- Sayuri Yoshinaga
- Meiko Kaji

== Prominent directors ==
- Tomu Uchida (1927-1932; 1936–1940; 1955)
- Yuzo Kawashima
- Seijun Suzuki
- Shouhei Imamura
- Keiichi Ozawa
- Toru Murakawa
- Yasuharu Hasebe
- Toshio Masuda
- Koreyoshi Kurahara
- Buichi Saitō

== Cultural references ==
In 2011, the French director Yves Montmayeur produced a documentary about the Pink Film period at Nikkatsu called Pinku Eiga: Inside the Pleasure Dome Of Japanese Erotic Cinema.

== See also ==
- List of Nikkatsu Roman Porno films
- Shochiku
- Toho
- Shintoho
- Tsuburaya Productions
- Kadokawa Daiei Studio
- Toei Company
- Daiei Film
