= Asakusa =

District of Tokyo, Japan

Coordinates: 35°42′52″N 139°47′48″E

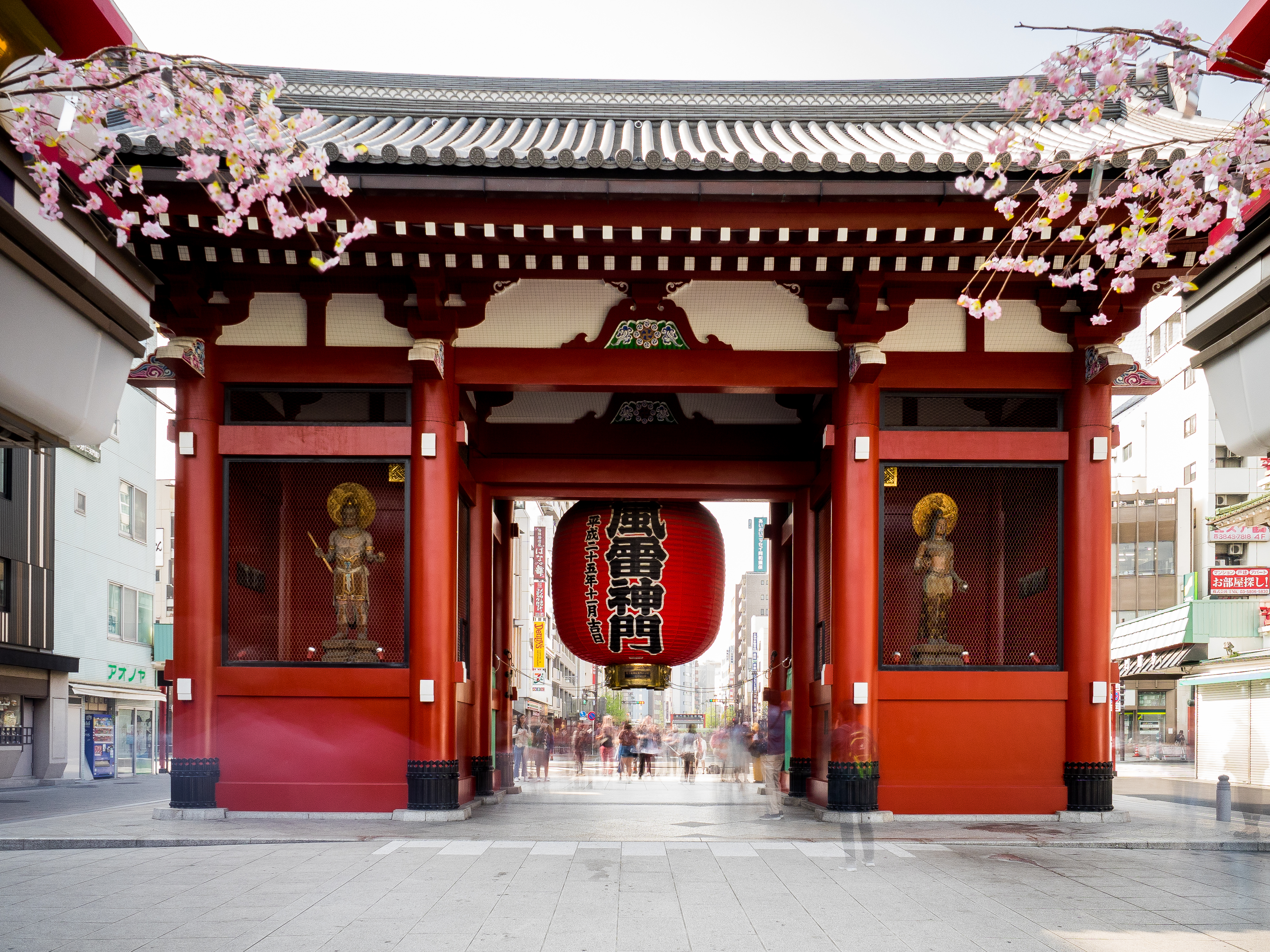
The Kaminarimon, with its giant chōchin, the outer gate of Sensō-ji temple

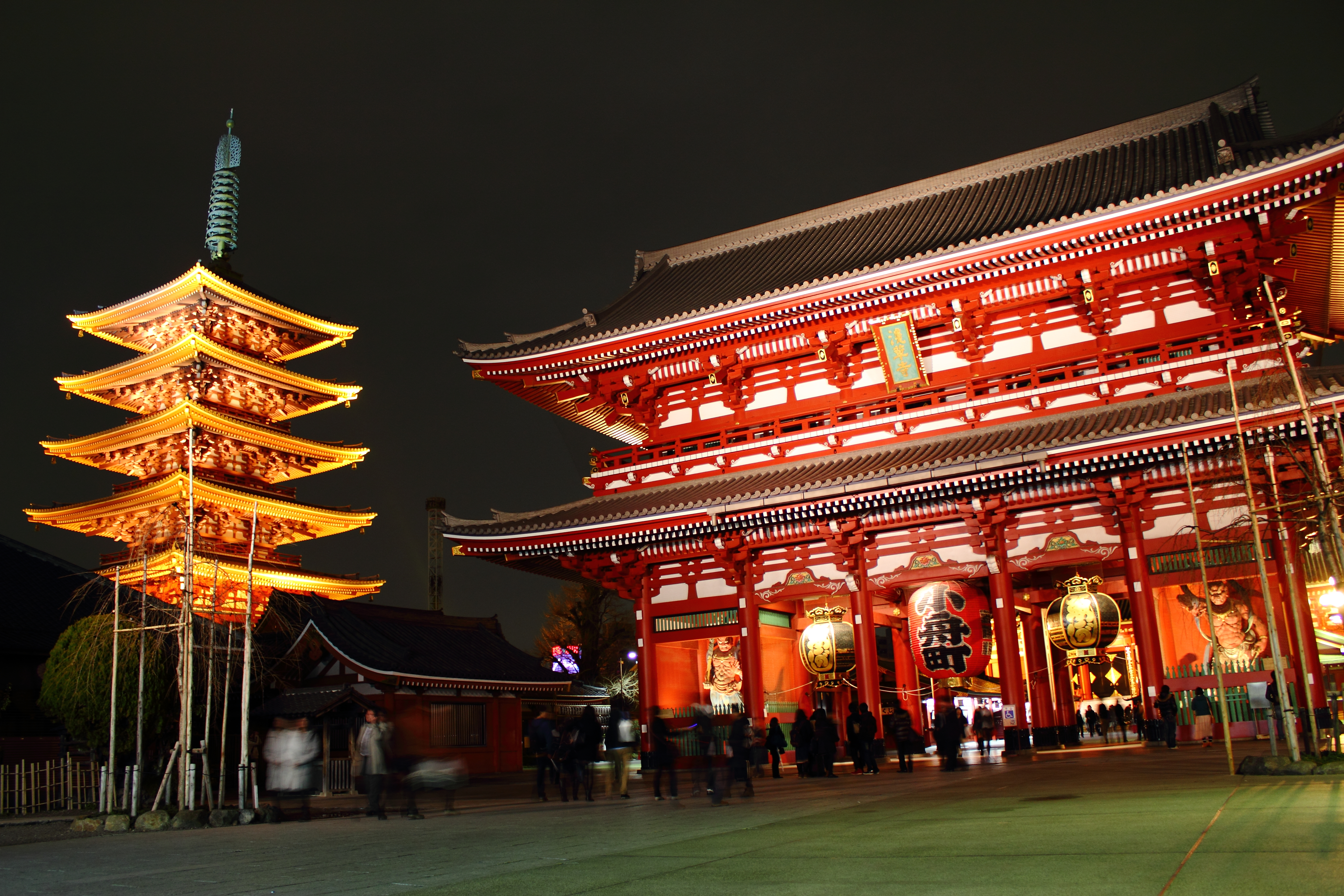
Sensō-ji at night

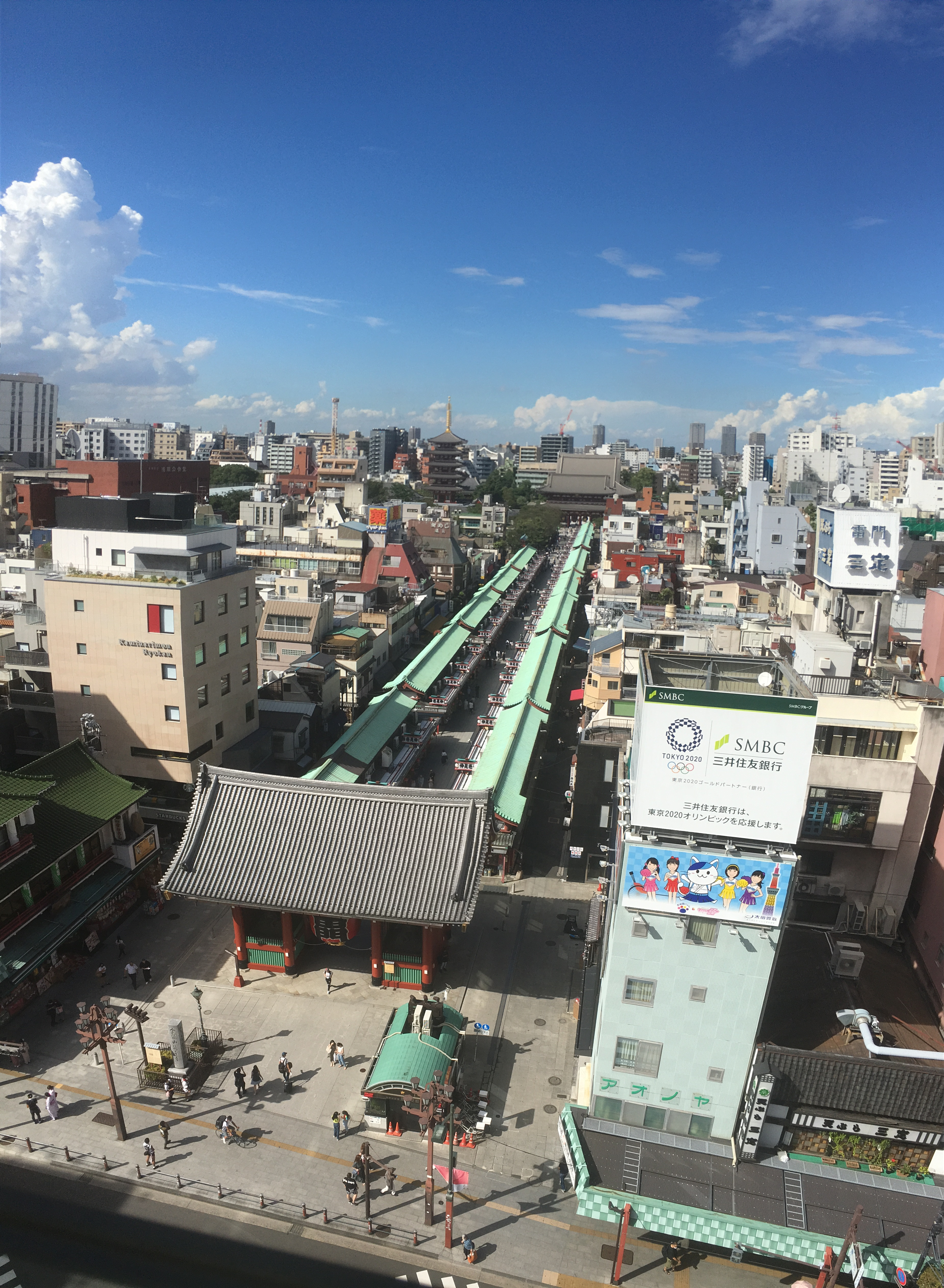
Aerial view of Asakusa

Asakusa (浅草; Japanese: [asakɯ̥sa]) is a district in Taitō, Tokyo, Japan. It is known for Sensō-ji, a Buddhist temple dedicated to the bodhisattva Kannon. There are several other temples in Asakusa, as well as various festivals, such as Sanja Matsuri.

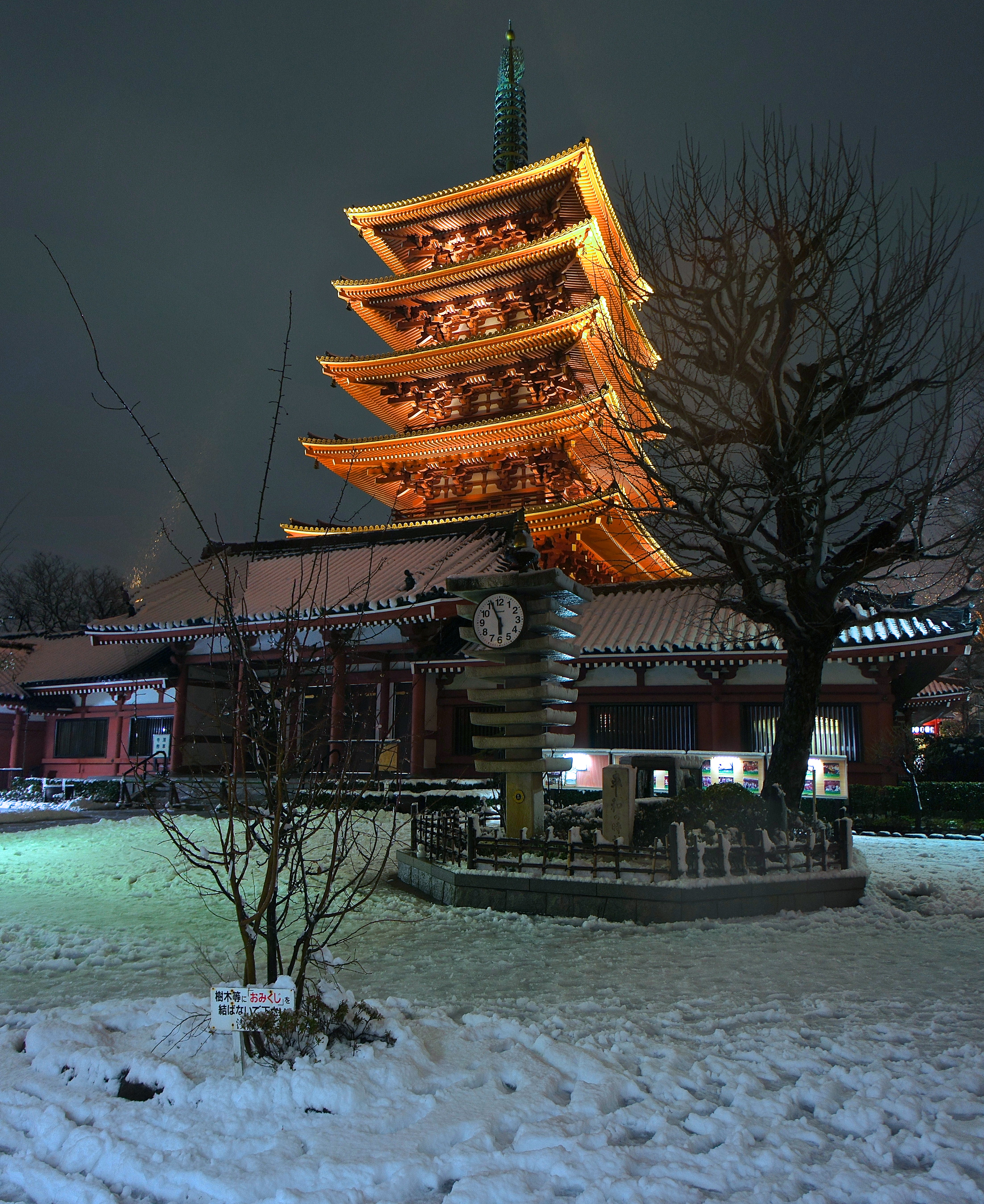
Snowfall at Sensoji

== History ==
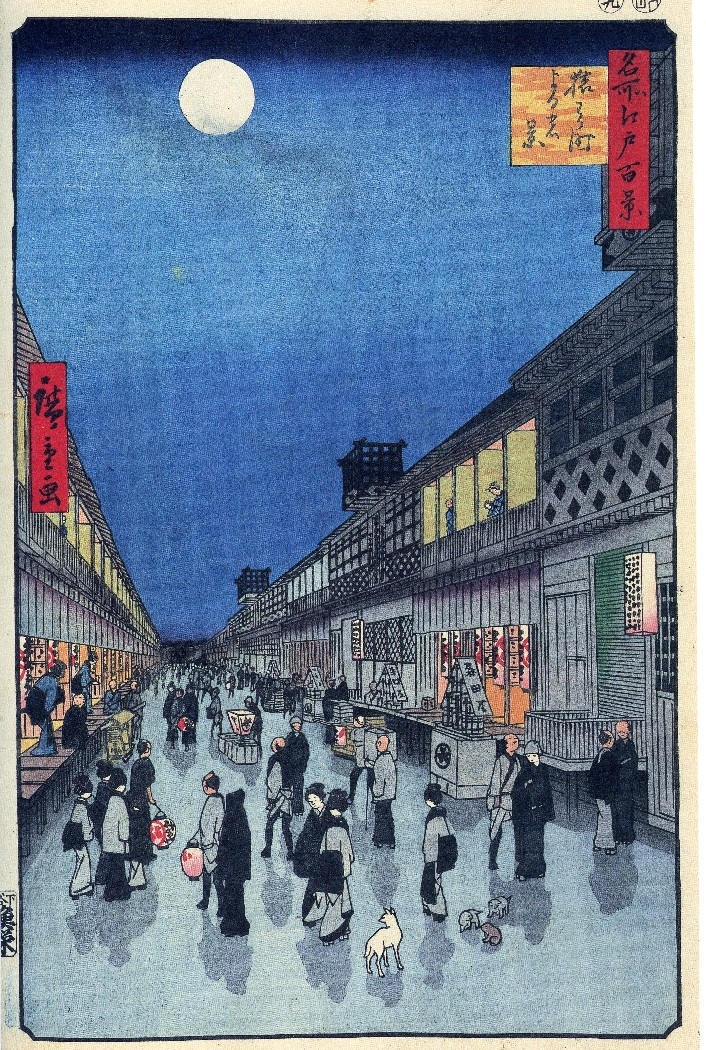
Asakusa rokku-chome was once the biggest theater district in Edo.

The development of Asakusa as an entertainment district during the Edo period came about in part because of the neighboring district, Kuramae. Kuramae was a district of storehouses for rice, which was then used as payment for servants of the feudal government. The keepers (fudasashi) of these storage houses initially stored the rice for a small fee, but over the years began exchanging the rice for money or selling it to local shopkeepers at a margin. Through such trading, many fudasashi came to have a considerable amount of disposable income and as result theaters and geisha houses began to spring up in nearby Asakusa.

For most of the 20th century, Asakusa remained a major entertainment district in Tokyo. The rokku or "Sixth District" was in particular famous as a theater district, featuring famous cinemas such as the Denkikan. The golden years of Asakusa are vividly portrayed in Yasunari Kawabata's novel The Scarlet Gang of Asakusa (1930). The area was heavily damaged by US bombing raids during World War II, particularly the 10 March 1945 firebombing of Tokyo. The area was rebuilt after the war, but has now been surpassed by Shinjuku and other colorful areas in the city in its role as a pleasure district.

Asakusa was a ward of Tokyo City. In 1947, when the city was transformed into a metropolis, it was merged with Shitaya to form the modern Taito ward. The former ward encompassed 19 neighborhoods in the eastern half of Taitō.

== Geography ==
Asakusa is on the north-east fringe of central Tokyo, at the eastern end of the Tokyo Metro Ginza Line subway, approximately one mile east of the major Ueno railway/subway interchange. It is central to the area colloquially referred to as Shitamachi, which literally means "low city," referring to the low elevation of this old part of Tokyo, on the banks of the Sumida River. As the name suggests, the area has a more traditionally Japanese atmosphere than some other neighborhoods in Tokyo do.

== Food and drink ==
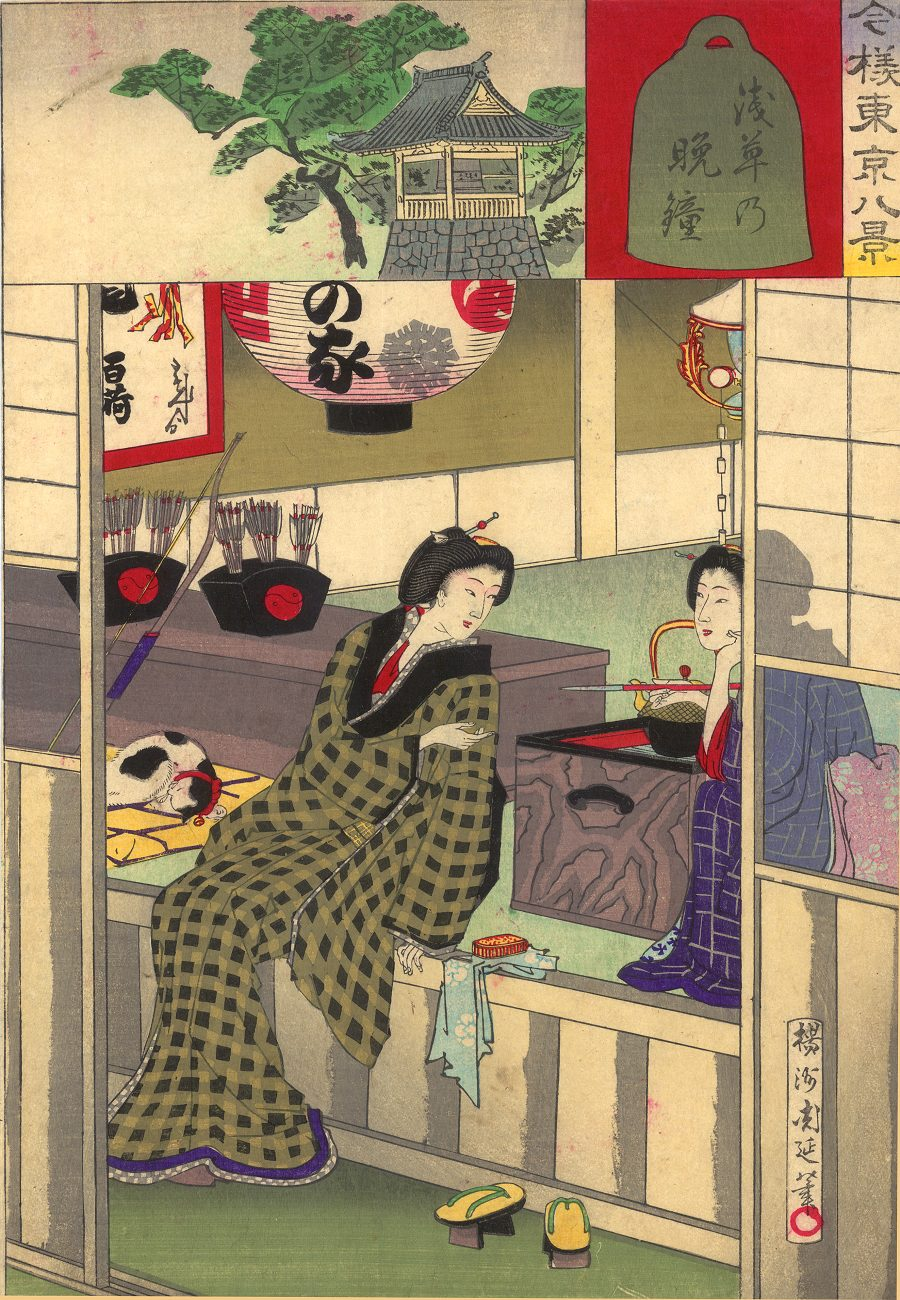
Two geisha relaxing after having entertained; the insets showing the curfew bell at Asakusa. Ukiyo-e woodblock print by Yōshū Chikanobu, 1888

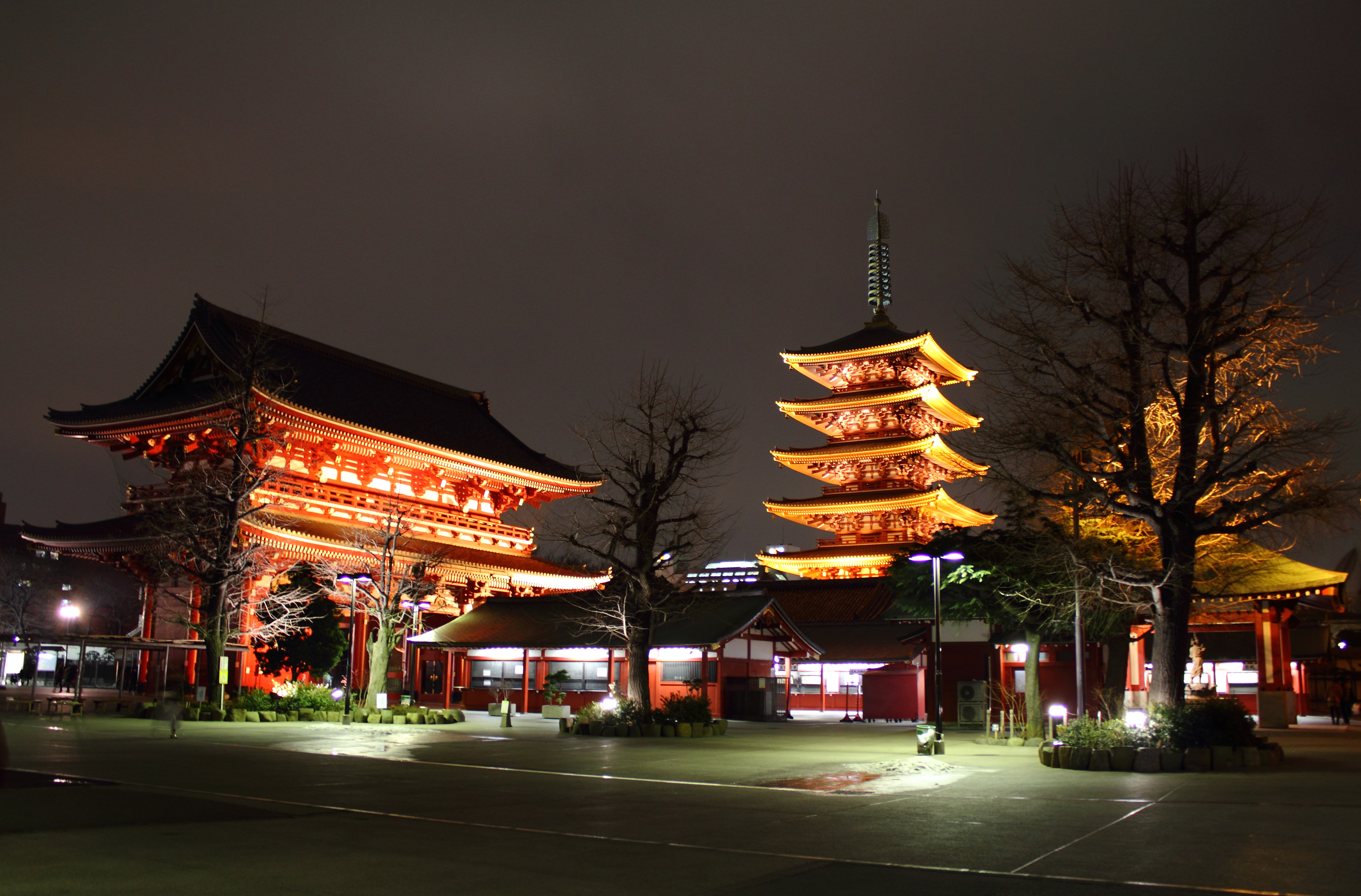
Temple in Asakusa

Asakusa has many restaurants and places to try traditional Japanese foods. One of the most popular treats is satsuma imo, sweet potatoes. Another special treat is chikuwa kamaboko, grilled fish cakes. The Suzuhiro store serves local craft beer with traditional kamaboko. Asakusa is also known for spices such as shichimi and sanshō.

In a city where there are very few buildings older than 50 years because of the wartime bombing, Asakusa has a greater concentration of buildings from the 1950s and 1960s than most other areas in Tokyo do. There are traditional ryokan (guest-houses) and small-scale apartment buildings throughout the district.

In keeping with a peculiarly Tokyo tradition, Asakusa hosts a major cluster of domestic kitchenware stores on Kappabashi-dori, which is visited by many Tokyoites for essential supplies. Next to the Sensō-ji temple grounds is a small amusement park called Hanayashiki, which claims to be the oldest amusement park in Japan. The neighborhood theaters specialize in showing classic Japanese films, as many of the tourists are elderly Japanese.

Cruises down the Sumida River depart from a wharf a five-minute walk from the temple.

Asakusa is Tokyo's oldest geisha district, and still has 45 actively working geisha.

Because of its colourful location, downtown credentials, and relaxed atmosphere by Tokyo standards, Asakusa is a popular accommodation choice for budget travelers.

== Carnival ==
The neighborhood is famous for its annual Brazilian style carnival. There is a significant Brazilian presence in the local community and the Association of Samba Schools of Asakusa is based there.

== Sanja Matsuri ==
Although there are many festivals throughout the year in Asakusa, the most famous of them is the Sanja Matsuri, also known as Sanja Festival, which takes place in May. In this festival, mikoshi (portable shrines) and floats are pulled through the streets while loud shouts accompany them, and during the festival's 3 days, 1.5 million people come out to celebrate.

== Transportation ==
The district has two railway stations with the same name:

- Asakusa Station
- Tobu Skytree Line (TS-01)
- Toei Asakusa Line (A-18)
- Tokyo Metro Ginza Line (G-19)
- Asakusa Station
- Tsukuba Express (TX-03)

== Education ==
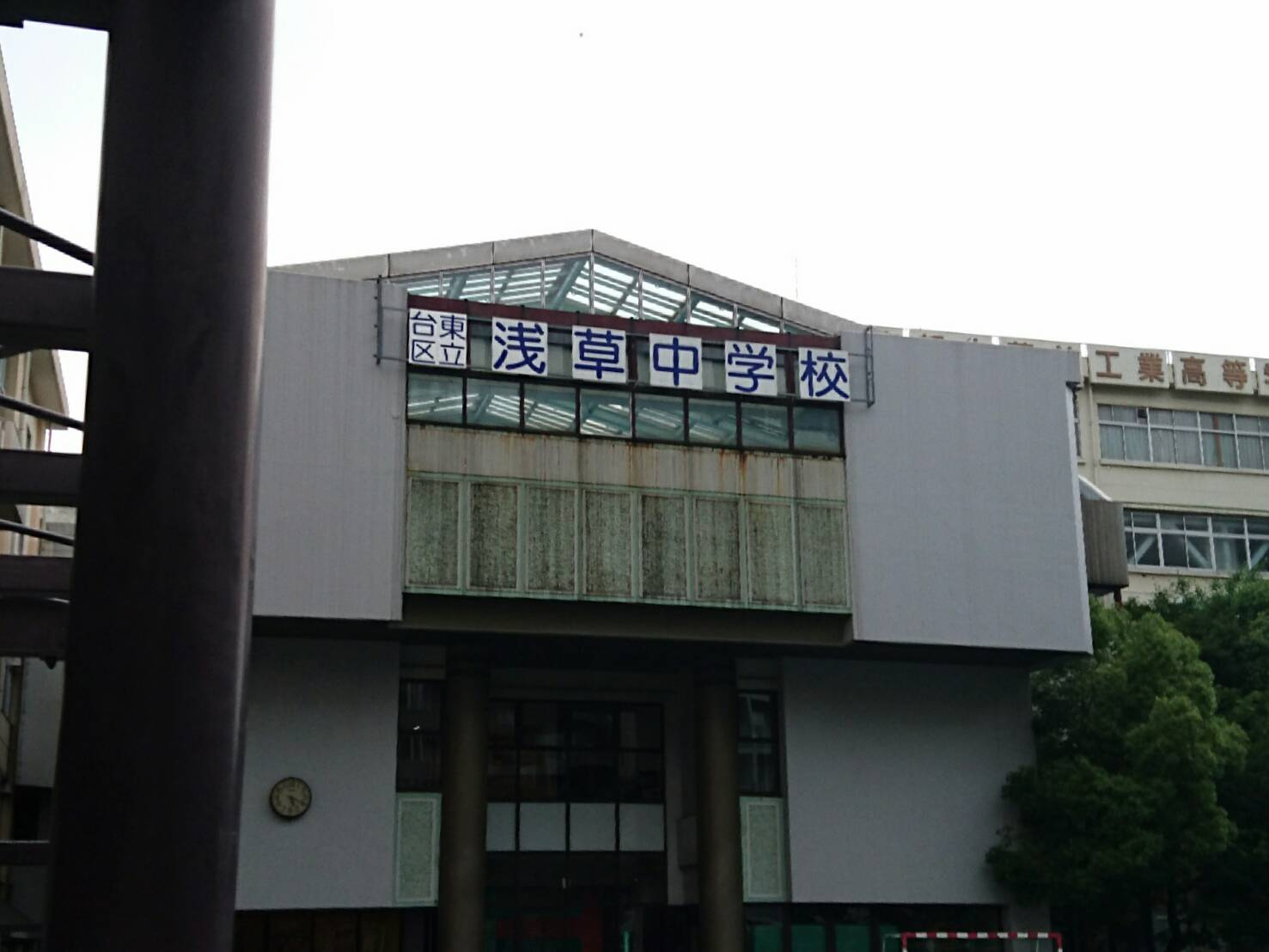
Asakusa Junior High School

Taitō City Board of Education operates public elementary and junior high schools.

Asakusa 1-chome and portions of 2-chome are zoned to Asakusa Elementary School. All of 6- and 7-chome and parts of 3-, 4-, and 5-chome are zoned to Fuji Elementary School. Parts of 3-, 4-, and 5-chome are zoned to Senzoku Elementary School. Portions of 2-chome are zoned to Kinryu Elementary School. Portions of 5-chome are zoned to Higashi-Asakusa Elementary School.

Asakusa 1- and 2-chome are zoned to Asakusa Junior High School. All of Asakusa 6- and 7-chome and portions of 3-, 4-, and 5-chome are zoned to Sakurabashi Junior High School. Portions of Asakusa 3-, 4-, and 5-chome are zoned to Hakuyo Junior High School.

== In art and literature ==
- Kawabata Yasunari, The Scarlet Gang of Asakusa (1930)
- Kankichi Ryotsu, protagonist of the popular anime and manga series KochiKame, is born in Asakusa.
- "Corn Dog," season 1, episode 2 of Midnight Diner, Tokyo Stories, a Netflix original series (2016), is about an old comedian who works in Asakusa and his successful young protégé.
- The anime Sarazanmai is set in Asakusa.
- In the anime and manga series Fire Force, Asakusa shows up as the district under the jurisdiction of the Special Fire Force Company 7 and is the setting of the Asakusa arc.
- In the popular anime and manga series, Demon Slayer, chapters 14–17 and episodes 7–10, the primary location is Taishō-period Asakusa.
- In video games, Senran Kagura is set in the fictional city of Asakusa Shopping District for 20 fictional shinobi characters in 4 fictional academies.

== See also ==
- Asakusa Culture Tourist Information Center
- Asakusa Shrine
- Hanayashiki, oldest amusement park in Japan.
- Hōzōmon
- Kaminarimon
- Kiuchi Kyō
- Luna Park, Tokyo
