= M. Pathe =

Japanese film studio, no longer active

M. Pathe (M・パテー商会, M. Patē Shōkai) was a Japanese film studio created by the Pathé group active in the early years of cinema in Japan.

== Background ==
M. Pathe was founded in 1906 by Shōkichi Umeya, a businessman who had distributed films first in Malaysia and Singapore and then in Japan. He took the name "M. Pathe" from the French Pathé Frères from which he imported films, although the companies had no official connection. Umeya built a studio in Ōkubo near Shinjuku, Tokyo.

Purportedly based on Sun Yat-sen's suggestion to use cinema for the public benefit, Umeya sought to connect film to the development of science, industry, and education. As a result, in 1906, M. Pathe imported more than 120 educational and scientific films form Europe.

An ambitious man, Umeya sent cameramen to Antarctica to record Nobu Shirase's expedition, and thus create one of Japan's first feature-length documentaries. He put on a high-class show, with pretty usherettes and high ticket prices, while also using his money to help fund Sun Yat-sen and the 1911 Revolution.

M. Pathe documented the success of the 1911 revolution beginning with the Wuchang Uprising and leading to Sun's inauguration, producing three documentary films that covered the revolution.

== Merger ==
It was under Umeya's instigation that Yoshizawa Shōten, Yokota Shōkai, and Fukuhōdō merged with M. Pathe to form Nikkatsu in 1912. His plan was to sever himself from M. Pathe's difficult financial straits by creating a trust that emulated the Motion Picture Patents Company.
